= List of 20th-century classical composers =

This is a list of composers of 20th-century classical music, sortable by name, year of birth, year of death, nationality, notable works, and remarks. It includes only composers of significant fame and importance. The style of the composer's music is given where possible, bearing in mind that some defy simple classification. Names are listed first by year of birth, then in alphabetical order within each year. The 20th century is defined by the calendar rather than by any unifying characteristics of musical style or attitude, and is therefore not an era of the same order as the classical or romantic. However, the century can be divided into modern and postmodern eras that overlap and can be defined more by differences in attitude than style.

Name	Year of birth	Year of death	Nationality	Notable 20th-century works	Remarks
Charles Dancla	1817	1907	French	Solo de concours no. 7, Op. 224	Romanticism
Luigi Arditi	1822	1903	Italian		
Theodor Kirchner	1823	1903	German		
Carl Reinecke	1824	1910	German	Trio for piano, clarinet and horn in B♭, Op. 274; String Quartet No. 5, Op. 287	Romanticism
Richard Hol	1825	1904	Dutch	Organ music	Romanticism
Ludwig Minkus	1826	1917	Austrian		
Morten Eskesen	1826	1913	Danish		
François-Auguste Gevaert	1828	1908	Belgian		Romanticism
Clémence de Grandval	1828	1907	French		
James Cutler Dunn Parker	1828	1916	American		Romanticism
Jacques Blumenthal	1829	1908	German		Romanticism
Karl Goldmark	1830	1915	Hungarian	Ein Wintermärchen; Aus Jugendtagen	
Karl Klindworth	1830	1916	German		
Hans Bronsart von Schellendorff	1830	1913	German		
Jan Gerard Palm	1831	1906	Dutch Antillean		
Benjamin Dwight Allen	1831	1914	German		
Salomon Jadassohn	1831	1902	German		Romanticism
Joseph Joachim	1831	1907	Hungarian		
Mathilde Hannah von Rothschild	1832	1924	German		
Charles-Wilfrid de Bériot	1833	1914	French		
Caspar Joseph Brambach	1833	1902	German		
Josef Richard Rozkošný	1833	1913	Czech		
George Becker	1834	1928	German-Swiss		
Francesco Berger	1834	1933	English		
Kārlis Baumanis	1835	1905	Latvian		
Giuseppe Branzoli	1835	1909	Italian		
César Cui	1835	1918	Russian		
Felix Draeseke	1835	1913	German		
Camille Saint-Saëns	1835	1921	French		
Eduard Strauss	1835	1916	Austrian		
Friedrich Baumfelder	1836	1916	German		
Bertha Tammelin	1836	1915	Swedish		
Susan McFarland Parkhurst	1836	1918	American		
Mily Balakirev	1837	1910	Russian	Islamey	
Théodore Dubois	1837	1924	French		
Carlotta Ferrari	1837	1907	Italian		
Alfred R. Gaul	1837	1913	English	The Prince of Peace (cantata)	
Otto Winter-Hjelm	1837	1931	Norwegian		
Paul Lacombe	1837	1927	French		
Smith Newell Penfield	1837	1920	American		
Émile Waldteufel	1837	1915	French		
Max Bruch	1838	1920	German	Concerto for Clarinet, Viola, and Orchestra in E minor, Op. 88	Romanticism
Joseph Callaerts	1838	1901	Belgian		
Melesio Morales	1838	1908	Mexican		
Friedrich Gernsheim	1839	1916	German		
Eduard Nápravník	1839	1916	Czech	Francesca da Rimini (opera), Op. 71; Deux pièces russes, for orchestra, Op. 74	
Laura Netzel	1839	1927	Swedish		
John Knowles Paine	1839	1906	American		
Josef Rheinberger	1839	1901	German	Organ Sonata No. 20 in F Major (“Zur Friedensfeier”), Op. 196; Mass in A Minor, Op. 197	historicist
Johan Svendsen	1840	1911	Norwegian		
François Borne	1840	1920	French		
Ingeborg Bronsart von Schellendorf	1840	1913	Swedish-German		
Theodora Cormontan	1840	1922	Norwegian American		
Oskar Rieding	1840	1918	German		
Elfrida Andrée	1841	1929	Swedish	Swedish Masses Nos. 1 and 2	
Antonín Dvořák	1841	1904	Czech	Armida (opera), "Zpěv z Lešetínského kováře" (song)	Romanticism, folk-influenced
Henri Gobbi	1841	1920	Hungarian		
Friedrich Hegar	1841	1927	Swiss		
Louise Héritte-Viardot	1841	1918	French		
Joseph Friedrich Hummel	1841	1919	Austrian		
Felip Pedrell	1841	1922	Spanish		
Giovanni Sgambati	1841	1914	Italian		
Giuseppe Silvestri	1841	1921	Italian		
Arrigo Boito	1842	1918	Italian	Nerone (opera)	
Alphonse Duvernoy	1842	1907	French		
Josef Labor	1842	1924	Czech		
Jules Massenet	1842	1912	French	Piano Concerto; Le jongleur de Notre-Dame; Thérèse; Don Quichotte; Cigale	
Felipe Pedrell	1842	1922	Spanish		
Ján Levoslav Bella	1843	1936	Slovak		
Émile Bernard	1843	1902	French	Nocturne, for piano and orchestra, Op. 51; String Quartet, Op. 52	
Josefina Brdlíková	1843	1910	Czech		
Louis Diémer	1843	1919	French		
Edvard Grieg	1843	1907	Norwegian	Lyrische Stücke, Op. 71; Slåtter, Op. 73; Four Psalms, Op. 74	
Asger Hamerik	1843	1923	Danish	Variations on "Jeg gik mig ud en sommerdag"	
Franz Xaver Neruda	1843	1915	Danish		
Karl Michael Ziehrer	1843	1922	Austrian		
David Popper	1843	1913	Czech		
Oliveria Prescott	1843	1919	English		
George Stephănescu	1843	1925	Romanian		
Eugène Gigout	1844	1925	French		
Hermann Graedener	1844	1929	German		
Richard Hofmann	1844	1918	German		
Nikolai Rimsky-Korsakov	1844	1908	Russian		
Pablo de Sarasate	1844	1908	Spanish		
Charles-Marie Widor	1844	1937	French		
Anton Jörgen Andersen	1845	1926	Norwegian		
August Bungert	1845	1915	German		
Ion Ivanovici	1845	1902	Romanian		
Gabriel Fauré	1845	1924	French	Prométhée; Pénélope; Masques et bergamasques	
Alphonse Hasselmans	1845	1912	Belgian-born French		
Ernst Perabo	1845	1920	German-born American		
Ella Adayevskaya	1846	1926	Russian		
Leopold Auer	1846	1930	Hungarian		
Ignaz Brüll	1846	1907	Austrian		
Luigi Denza	1846	1922	Italian		
Zygmunt Noskowski	1846	1909	Polish		
Riccardo Drigo	1846	1930	Italian		
Andreas Hallén	1846	1925	Swedish	Valborgsmässa (opera)	Romanticism
Marie Jaëll	1846	1925	French		
Albert Lavignac	1846	1916	French		
Franz Ries	1846	1932	German		
Paolo Tosti	1846	1916	Italian		
Joachim Andersen	1847	1909	Danish		
Agathe Backer Grøndahl	1847	1907	Norwegian		
Ignacio Cervantes	1847	1905	Cuban		
Francis Chassaigne	1847	1922	Belgian-born French		
Constantin Dimitrescu	1847	1928	Romanian		
Robert Fuchs	1847	1927	Austrian	Symphony No. 3 in E major, Op. 79; Clarinet Quintet in E♭ major, Op. 102	
Ludwig Philipp Scharwenka	1847	1917	German-Polish		
Chiquinha Gonzaga	1847	1935	Brazilian		
Alexander Mackenzie	1847	1935	Scottish	The Cricket on the Hearth	Romanticism
Sveinbjörn Sveinbjörnsson	1847	1927	Icelandic		
Rudolf Tillmetz	1847	1915	German		
Agnes Zimmermann	1847	1925	German		
Frances Allitsen	1848	1912	English		
Henri Duparc	1848	1933	French		
Richard Eilenberg	1848	1927	German		
František Kmoch	1848	1912	Czech		
Otto Malling	1848	1915	Danish		
William J. McCoy	1848	1926	American		
Hubert Parry	1848	1918	English	Jerusalem	
Ludvig Schytte	1848	1909	Danish		
Fritz Seitz	1848	1918	German		
Johann Baptist Singenberger	1848	1924	Swiss-American		historicist
Catalina Berroa	1849	1911	Cuban		
Roberta Geddes-Harvey	1849	1930	Canadian		
Ernesto Köhler	1849	1907	Italian		
Nanna Liebmann	1849	1935	Danish		
Stephanie Wurmbrand-Stuppach	1849	1919	Hungarian		
Richard Barth	1850	1923	German		
Ludvig Birkedal-Barfod	1850	1937	Danish		
Tomás Bretón	1850	1923	Spanish		
Richard Heuberger	1850	1914	Austrian		
Iver Holter	1850	1941	Norwegian		
Alfredo Keil	1850	1907	Portuguese		
Peter Lange-Müller	1850	1926	Danish		
Alexandre Luigini	1850	1906	French		
C. A. Bracco	1850	1903	Italian		
Franz Xaver Scharwenka	1850	1924	German		
Antonio Scontrino	1850	1922	Italian		
Emilio Serrano y Ruiz	1850	1939	Spanish		
Hans Sitt	1850	1922	Czech		
Heinrich Reimann	1850	1906	German		
Alexander Taneyev	1850	1918	Russian		
Victor Bendix	1851	1926	Danish	Symphony No. 4 in D minor, Op. 30	
Jan Blockx	1851	1912	Belgian		
Mary Grant Carmichael	1851	1935	English		
Emanuel Chvála	1851	1924	Czech		
Gabrielle Ferrari	1851	1921	French-Italian		
Ludvig Hegner	1851	1923	Danish		
Vincent d'Indy	1851	1931	French	String Quartet No. 3; Symphony No. 2 in B♭; Jour d'été à la montagne	
W. H. Jude	1851	1922	English		
André Wormser	1851	1926	French		
Josef Bayer	1852	1913	Austrian	Das Damenduell	Romanticism
Frederick Corder	1852	1932	English		Romanticism
Frederic Hymen Cowen	1852	1935	British	Miniature Variations for orchestra	Romanticism
Alfred Grünfeld	1852	1924	Austrian		Romanticism
Francisco Tárrega	1852	1909	Spanish		
Hans Huber	1852	1921	Swiss		Romanticism
Helena Munktell	1852	1919	Swedish		Romanticism
Henrique Oswald	1852	1931	Brazilian		
Raoul Pugno	1852	1914	French		
Émile Sauret	1852	1920	French		Romanticism
Charles Villiers Stanford	1852	1924	Irish	Six Irish Rhapsodies	Romanticism
Teresa Carreño	1853	1917	Venezuelan		Romanticism
Arthur Foote	1853	1937	American		Romanticism
Hugo Richard Jüngst	1853	1923	German		Romanticism
Iwan Knorr	1853	1916	German		Romanticism
Hans von Koessler	1853	1926	German		Romanticism
Charles Malherbe	1853	1911	French		Romanticism
Jean Louis Nicodé	1853	1919	Prussian		Romanticism
Emil Sjögren	1853	1918	Swedish		Romanticism
Arturo Buzzi-Peccia	1854	1943	Italian	songs and piano works	
George Whitefield Chadwick	1854	1931	American		
Oscar Fetrás	1854	1931	German		
Gerónimo Giménez	1854	1923	Spanish		
Pekka Hannikainen	1854	1924	Finnish		
Engelbert Humperdinck	1854	1921	German		
Leoš Janáček	1854	1928	Czech	Sinfonietta; Taras Bulba; Káťa Kabanová; The Cunning Little Vixen; The Makropoulos Affair; Glagolitic Mass, 2 string quartets	folk-influenced
Alexander Kopylov	1854	1911	Russian		
Heinrich Köselitz	1854	1918	German		
Moritz Moszkowski	1854	1925	German-Polish		
Julie Rivé-King	1854	1937	American		
Antonio Smareglia	1854	1929	Austro-Hungarian		
John Philip Sousa	1854	1932	American		
Bernard Zweers	1854	1924	Dutch		
Károly Aggházy	1855	1918	Hungarian		
Jørgen Ditleff Bondesen	1855	1939	Danish		
Heinrich Grünfeld	1855	1931	Bohemian-Austrian		
Nicolaj Hansen	1855	1932	Danish		
Josef Klička	1855	1937	Czech		
Jean Pietrapertosa	1855	1940	Italian-French		
Anatoly Lyadov	1855	1914	Russian		
Arnold Mendelssohn	1855	1933	German	Deutsche Messe, Op. 89; Geistliche Chormusik, Op. 90	
Julius Röntgen	1855	1932	German		
Richard Sahla	1855	1931	German		
Maude Valérie White	1855	1937	French-born English		
Guglielmo Zuelli	1859	1941	Italian		
Cecilia Arizti	1856	1930	Cuban		
Eva Dell'Acqua	1856	1930	Belgian		
Kateřina Emingerová	1856	1934	Czech		
Robert Fischhof	1856	1918	Austrian		
André Gedalge	1856	1926	French		
Helen Hopekirk	1856	1945	Scottish-American		
Natalia Janotha	1856	1932	Polish		
Felix Mottl	1856	1911	Austrian		
Gilda Ruta	1856	1932	Italian		
Mary Elizabeth Turner Salter	1856	1938	American		
Eduard Schütt	1856	1933	Russian		
Christian Sinding	1856	1941	Norwegian		Romanticism
George Strong	1856	1948	American		
Sergei Taneyev	1856	1915	Russian	String Quartet No. 6 in B♭ major; Piano Quartet in E major; Piano Quintet in G minor	
Timothee Adamowski	1857	1943	Polish-born American		
Berta Bock	1857	1945	Romanian		
Alfred Bruneau	1857	1934	French		
Cécile Chaminade	1857	1944	French	Concertino for Flute	
Frederic Cliffe	1857	1931	English	Ode to the North-East Wind	Romanticism
Rudolf Dellinger	1857	1910	German		
Árpád Doppler	1857	1927	Hungarian-German		
Edward Elgar	1857	1934	English	Symphony No. 1; No. 2; Violin Concerto; Cello Concerto; The Dream of Gerontius; Pomp and Circumstance Marches	Romanticism
Ethel R. Harraden	1857	1917	English		
Gustav Helsted	1857	1924	Danish		
Wilhelm Kienzl	1857	1941	Austrian		
Ruggero Leoncavallo	1857	1919	Italian	Zingari (opera)	verismo
František Ondříček	1857	1922	Czech		
Rosalind Ellicott	1857	1924	English		
Henry Schoenfeld	1857	1936	American		
Achille Simonetti	1857	1928	Italian and English		
César Thomson	1857	1931	Belgian		
Mary Knight Wood	1857	1944	American		
Siegfried Alkan	1858	1941	German		
Heinrich Berté	1858	1924	Austrian-Hungarian	Der Glücksnarr	
Thomas Bidgood	1858	1925	English		
Mélanie Bonis	1858	1937	French		
Isidore de Lara	1858	1935	English		
Catharinus Elling	1858	1942	Norwegian	Violin Concerto in D minor	Romanticism
Richard Franck	1858	1938	German		
Guy d'Hardelot	1858	1936	French		
Ludvig Holm	1858	1928	Danish		
Jenő Hubay	1858	1937	Hungarian		
Georges Hüe	1858	1948	French		
Lucien-Léon Guillaume Lambert	1858	1945	French		
Frank Lynes	1858	1913	American		
Giacomo Puccini	1858	1924	Italian	La fanciulla del West; Turandot	Romanticism; post-romanticism; verismo
Catharina van Rennes	1858	1940	Dutch		
Risto Savin	1858	1948	Slovenian		
Ethel Smyth	1858	1944	English		
Stella Stocker	1858	1925	American		
Eugène Ysaÿe	1858	1931	Belgian		
Gerard von Brucken Fock	1859	1935	Dutch	De wederkomst van Christus	
Hedwige Chrétien	1859	1944	French		
Laura Sedgwick Collins	1859	1927	American		
Teresa Tanco Cordovez de Herrera	1859	1946	Colombian		
August Enna	1859	1939	Danish		
Josef Bohuslav Foerster	1859	1951	Czech		
Narcisa Freixas	1859	1926	Spanish		
Arthur Friedheim	1859	1932	Russian		
Susie Frances Harrison	1859	1935	Canadian		
Basil Harwood	1859	1949	English		
Victor Herbert	1859	1924	Irish-American	The Magic Knight (opera); The Red Mill (musical comedy); A Suite of Serenades	
Mikhail Ippolitov-Ivanov	1859	1935	Russian		
Sergei Lyapunov	1859	1924	Russian		
Ida Georgina Moberg	1859	1947	Finnish	Symphony	
Vincenza Garelli della Morea	1859	1924	Italian		
William Reed	1859	1945	Canadian		
Hope Temple	1859	1938	Irish		
Ellen Riley Wright	1859	1904	English		
Isaac Albéniz	1860	1909	Spanish	Iberia	Romanticism
Valborg Aulin	1860	1928	Swedish		
Gustave Charpentier	1860	1956	French	Julien	
Victor Ewald	1860	1935	Russian		
Bohumil Fidler	1860	1944	Czech		
Pietro Floridia	1860	1932	Italian		
Alberto Franchetti	1860	1942	Italian		
Gisela Frankl	1860	1935	Austrian		
Axel Gade	1860	1921	Danish		
Raoul Gunsbourg	1860	1955	Romanian		
Celeste de Longpré Heckscher	1860	1928	American		
Edward MacDowell	1860	1908	American		
Hugo Wolf	1860	1903	Austrian		
Gustav Mahler	1860	1911	Austrian	No. 5, No. 6, No. 9, No. 10 in F; Das Lied von der Erde; Kindertotenlieder	Romanticism; modernism
Ignacy Jan Paderewski	1860	1941	Polish	Symphony in B minor, Op. 24	
Edouard Potjes	1860	1931	Dutch	At Dawn Eastermorning for orchestra	
Emil von Reznicek	1860	1945	Austrian	two symphonies	
William Wallace	1860	1940	Scottish		
Felix Woyrsch	1860	1944	German		
Anton Arensky	1861	1906	Russian	Piano Trio no. 2 in F minor, Op. 73	
Spyridon Samaras	1861	1917	Greek		
Wilhelm Berger	1861	1911	German	Symphony No. 2 in B minor, Op. 80; Variations and Fugue on an Original Theme, Op. 97; Serenade for Twelve Winds, Op. 102	Romanticism
Marco Enrico Bossi	1861	1925	Italian		
Pierre de Bréville	1861	1949	French		
Georgy Catoire	1861	1926	Russian		
Florence Everilda Goodeve	1861	1915	English		
Charles Martin Loeffler	1861	1935	French-born American		
Rudolf Raimann	1861	1913	Hungarian	Unser Stammhalter (opera)	Romanticism
Marie Emmanuel Augustin Savard	1861	1942	French		
Václav Suk	1861	1933	Czech-born Russian		
Ludwig Thuille	1861	1907	Austrian		
Conrad Ansorge	1862	1930	German		
Florence Aylward	1862	1950	English		
Meliton Balanchivadze	1862	1937	Georgian		
Dora Bright	1862	1951	English	Ballets The Dryad (1907), A Dancer's Adventure (1915)	
Georgi Conus	1862	1933	Russian		
Walter Damrosch	1862	1950	German-born American	Sonata for violin and piano	
Arthur De Greef	1862	1940	Belgian	Concerto for Piano and Orchestra No. 1 in C minor, Concerto for Piano and Orchestra No. 2 in B♭ minor, Sonata in C minor for 2 Pianos	
Claude Debussy	1862	1918	French	Clair de lune; Syrinx; La mer; Pelléas et Mélisande; Préludes	impressionism
Frederick Delius	1862	1934	English	A Village Romeo and Juliet; On Hearing the First Cuckoo in Spring	impressionism
Alphons Diepenbrock	1862	1921	Dutch		
Stéphan Elmas	1862	1937	Armenian		
Maurice Emmanuel	1862	1938	French		
Edward German	1862	1936	English	Merrie England; A Princess of Kensington; Tom Jones	
Henry Holden Huss	1862	1953	American		
Carrie Jacobs-Bond	1862	1946	American	"I Love You Truly"	
Mona McBurney	1862	1932	British		
August Nölck	1862	1928	German		
Ferdinand Pfohl	1862	1949	German		
Emil von Sauer	1862	1942	German		
Alberto Williams	1862	1952	Argentine	Poema del Iguazú, nine symphonies	folk-influenced, modernism, impressionism, nationalism, post-Wagnerian
Daniel Doura	1957		Argentine	Sinfonía argentina	
Hugo Becker	1863	1941	German	Cello Concerto	
Felix Blumenfeld	1863	1931	Russian		
Charles Bordes	1863	1909	French		
Maria Chefaliady-Taban	1863	1932	Romanian		
Enrique Fernández Arbós	1863	1939	Spanish		
Abbie Gerrish-Jones	1863	1929	American		
Helen Francis Hood	1863	1949	American		
Hugo Kaun	1863	1932	German	Symphony No. 3 in E minor, Op. 96	
Izabella Kuliffay	1863	1945	Hungarian	Magyar suite	
Pietro Mascagni	1863	1945	Italian	Amica	verismo
Emánuel Moór	1863	1931	Hungarian		
Cornélie van Oosterzee	1863	1943	Dutch		
Horatio Parker	1863	1919	American		
Gabriel Pierné	1863	1937	French	Cydalise et le Chèvre-pied; Ramuntcho	
Alfred Reisenauer	1863	1907	German		
Vladimir Sokalsky	1863	1919	Russian		
Arthur Somervell	1863	1937	English		
Jāzeps Vītols	1863	1948	Latvian		
Eugen d'Albert	1864	1932	German, Swiss; Scottish-born	Tiefland	Romanticism
Hugh Blair	1864	1932	English	Magnificat; Nunc Dimittis for double choir	
Hjalmar Borgstrøm	1864	1925	Norwegian	Piano Concerto in C, Op. 22, Violin Concerto in G major Op. 25, Piano Quintet in F Op. 31,	
Ricardo Castro	1864	1907	Mexican		
Harry Falkenau	1864	1907	American		
Eleanor Everest Freer	1864	1942	American		
Louis Glass	1864	1936	Danish		
Alexander Gretchaninov	1864	1956	Russian		
Peter Griesbacher	1864	1933	German		historicist
Johan Halvorsen	1864	1935	Norwegian	Norwegian rhapsodies, three symphonies	Romanticism, French influence
Sakunosuke Koyama	1864	1927	Japanese		
Alessandro Longo	1864	1945	Italian		
Alberto Nepomuceno	1864	1920	Brazilian		
Guy Ropartz	1864	1955	French	Le Pays	impressionism
Richard Strauss	1864	1949	German	An Alpine Symphony; Der Rosenkavalier; Oboe Concerto; Salome; Metamorphosen	Romanticism
Giovanni Tebaldini	1864	1952	Italian		historicist
August de Boeck	1865	1937	Belgian		impressionism
Herbert Brewer	1865	1928	English		
Eduardo di Capua	1865	1917	Italian		
Paul Dukas	1865	1935	French	La Péri (ballet)	
Herbert J. Ellis	1865	1903	English		
Paul Gilson	1865	1942	Belgian		impressionism
Alexander Glazunov	1865	1936	Russian	Symphony No. 4 and No. 5; The Seasons (ballet); Violin Concerto; Saxophone Concerto	Romanticism
Alfred Hollins	1865	1942	English		
Borghild Holmsen	1865	1938	Norwegian		
Gustav Jenner	1865	1920	German		
Robert Kahn	1865	1951	German		
Emil Kauppi	1865	1930	Finnish		
Albéric Magnard	1865	1914	French	Guercoeur	
Enric Morera i Viura	1865	1942	Spanish		
Carl Nielsen	1865	1931	Danish	Symphony No. 4; No. 5; Maskarade; Clarinet Concerto	
Giacomo Orefice	1865	1922	Italian		
Jean Sibelius	1865	1957	Finnish	Symphonies No. 2, No. 4, No. 5, No. 7; Violin Concerto; String Quartet in D minor, Voces intimae; Pelléas et Mélisande; Pohjola's Daughter; Luonnotar; The Oceanides; Tapiola; The Tempest	
Amanda Christina Elizabeth Aldridge	1866	1956	British		
Tor Aulin	1866	1914	Swedish		
John Clare Billing	1866	1955	English		
Ferruccio Busoni	1866	1924	Italian	Fantasia contrappuntistica; Turandot Suite; Piano Concerto	
Francesco Cilea	1866	1950	Italian	L'arlesiana; Adriana Lecouvreur	
Gustave Doret	1866	1943	Swiss		
Vasily Kalinnikov	1866	1901	Russian		
Clara Anna Korn	1866	1941	American	Piano Concerto	
Laura Lemon	1866	1924	Canadian		
Vladimir Rebikov	1866	1920	Russian	Yolka (opera), Basni v litzakh (9 dramatic fables for children)	
Caro Roma	1866	1937	American		
Erik Satie	1866	1925	French	Gymnopédies; Relâche; Socrate	minimalism, avant-garde, furniture music
Johann Strauss III	1866	1939	Austrian		
Samuel Maykapar	1867	1938	Russian		
Amy Beach	1867	1944	American		
Margherita Galeotti	1867	1912	Italian	Piano Trio in D minor	
Umberto Giordano	1867	1948	Italian	Siberia; Madame Sans-Gêne; La cena delle beffe	verismo
Enrique Granados	1867	1916	Spanish	Goyescas (piano suite); Goyescas	
Fini Henriques	1867	1940	Danish		
Amy Elsie Horrocks	1867	1920	English		
Wilhelm Peterson-Berger	1867	1942	Swedish	Frösöblomster	Romantic nationalism
Charles Koechlin	1867	1950	French	Les Bandar-log; Les Heures persanes	eclectic, atonality, twelve-tone technique, serialism, polytonality, quartal and quintal harmony
Ferdinand Küchler	1867	1937	German		
Margaret Ruthven Lang	1867	1972	American		
Jules Mouquet	1867	1946	French		
Karel Navrátil	1867	1936	Czech		
Česlovas Sasnauskas	1867	1916	Lithuanian		
Martinus Sieveking	1867	1950	Dutch		
Gustav Strube	1867	1953	German		
Georges Martin Witkowski	1867	1943	French		
Granville Bantock	1868	1946	British	Omar Khayyám, Hebridean Symphony	Romanticism, often with an exotic flavour
Hermann Bischoff	1868	1936	German		
František Drdla	1868	1944	Czech		
Carl Frühling	1868	1937	Austrian	Suite in F major, Op. 36	
Alberto Jonás	1868	1943	Spanish		
Scott Joplin	1868	1917	American	Treemonisha	ragtime
Frederic Lamond	1868	1948	Scottish		
Signe Lund	1868	1950	Norwegian	Valse de Concert Op. 40	
Hamish MacCunn	1868	1916	Scottish		
John Blackwood McEwen	1868	1948	Scottish		
Oskar Merikanto	1868	1924	Finnish		
Vittorio Monti	1868	1922	Italian	Csárdás	
Jan Brandts Buys	1868	1933	Dutch-Austrian		
Lodewijk Mortelmans	1868	1952	Belgian		
José Vianna da Motta	1868	1948	Portuguese		
Annie Patterson	1868	1934	Irish		
Max von Schillings	1868	1933	German		
Tokichi Setoguchi	1868	1941	Japanese		
Leone Sinigaglia	1868	1944	Italian		
Haldane Stewart	1868	1942	English		
Komitas	1869	1935	Armenian		
Joséphine Boulay	1869	1925	French		
Vassily Brandt	1869	1923	Russian		
Julius Conus	1869	1942	Russian		
Walford Davies	1869	1941	British		
Christian Geisler	1869	1951	Danish		
Alfred Hill	1869	1960	Australian		
Armas Järnefelt	1869	1958	Finnish		
Vasily Kalafati	1869	1942	Russian		
John N. Klohr	1869	1956	American	Billboard March	
Demetrios Lialios	1869	1940	Greek	chamber music	
Henryk Melcer-Szczawiński	1869	1928	Polish		
Hans Pfitzner	1869	1949	German	Palestrina	post-romanticism
Maria Antonietta Picconi	1869	1926	Italian		
Albert Roussel	1869	1937	French	Symphony No. 3 and No. 4; Bacchus et Ariane (ballet)	neoclassicism
Patty Stair	1869	1926	American		
Ludvík Čelanský	1870	1931	Czech		
Cornelis Dopper	1870	1939	Dutch		
Henry Eichheim	1870	1942	American		
Leopold Godowsky	1870	1938	Polish	Studies on Chopin's Études; Passacaglia; Triakontameron	
Viktor Kalinnikov	1870	1927	Russian		
Nobu Kōda	1870	1946	Japanese	Violin Sonata in E♭ major; Violin Sonata in D minor	
Arseny Koreshchenko	1870	1921	Russian		
Zygmunt Stojowski	1870	1946	Polish		
Franz Lehár	1870	1948	Hungarian	Der Graf von Luxemburg, Der Zarewitsch	operettas
Vítězslav Novák	1870	1949	Czech		
Arthur Pryor	1870	1942	American		
Joseph Ryelandt	1870	1965	Belgian		
Rosario Scalero	1870	1954	Italian		
Florent Schmitt	1870	1958	French	La Tragédie de Salomé	
Mon Schjelderup	1870	1934	Norwegian	Sonata in B minor, Op. 12	
Oscar Straus	1870	1954	Austrian	Ein Walzertraum; The Chocolate Soldier	
Charles Tournemire	1870	1939	French	L'Orgue Mystique	
Louis Vierne	1870	1937	French		
Ernest Walker	1870	1949	Indian-born English		
Giacomo Balla	1871	1958	Italian		
Henry Kimball Hadley	1871	1937	American		
Adolphe Biarent	1871	1916	Belgian		
Frederick Converse	1871	1940	American	The Mystic Trumpeter	
Hélène-Frédérique de Faye-Jozin	1871	1942	French		
Leon Jessel	1871	1942	German	The Parade of the Tin Soldiers	
Ruben Liljefors	1871	1936	Swedish		
Zakaria Paliashvili	1871	1933	Georgian	Operas Abesalom da Eteri, Daisi, Latavra	
Oreste Ravanello	1871	1938	Italian		
Daniel Alomía Robles	1871	1942	Peruvian		
Alexander Spendiaryan	1871	1936	Armenian		
Wilhelm Stenhammar	1871	1927	Swedish	Symphony No. 2	Romanticism
Alexander von Zemlinsky	1871	1942	Austrian	Lyric Symphony; String Quartet No. 2; Der Zwerg	post-Romanticism, New Objectivity, neoclassicism
Hugo Alfvén	1872	1960	Swedish	Symphony No. 4: From the Outermost Skerries; Midsummer Vigil	Romanticism
Eyvind Alnæs	1872	1932	Norwegian	two symphonies, Piano Concerto	
Frederic Austin	1872	1952	English	Symphony in E minor	
Stanislav Binički	1872	1942	Serbian	Marš na Drinu	
Henri Büsser	1872	1973	French		
Julius Fučík	1872	1916	Czech	Entrance of the Gladiators	
Rubin Goldmark	1872	1936	American		
Siegmund von Hausegger	1872	1948	Austrian		
Ezra Jenkinson	1872	1947	English		
Paul Juon	1872	1940	Russian		
Joan Lamote de Grignon	1872	1949	Spanish		
Lorenzo Perosi	1872	1956	Italian	Il Giudizio Universale (oratorio)	historicist
William H. Potstock	1872	1941	American		
Albert Seitz	1872	1937	French		
Bernhard Sekles	1872	1934	German		
Alexander Scriabin	1872	1915	Russian	The Poem of Ecstasy; Prometheus: The Poem of Fire; piano sonatas nos. 4–10	mysticism
Sergei Vasilenko	1872	1956	Russian		
Ralph Vaughan Williams	1872	1958	English	A Sea Symphony; A London Symphony; Sinfonia antartica; Fantasia on a Theme by Thomas Tallis; Fantasia on Greensleeves; The Lark Ascending	impressionism, folk-influenced
Salvator Léonardi	1872	1938	Italian		
Emil Votoček	1872	1950	Czech		
Modest Altschuler	1873	1963	Russian		
Dimitri Arakishvili	1873	1953	Georgian		
William Henry Bell	1873	1946	English		
Blagoje Bersa	1873	1934	Croatian		
André Bloch	1873	1960	French		
Lucien Capet	1873	1928	French	Poème for violin and orchestra	
Anna Cramer	1873	1968	Dutch		
Leo Fall	1873	1925	Austrian	Madame Pompadour (operetta)	Romanticism
Joseph Jongen	1873	1953	Belgian	Symphonie Concertante for organ and orchestra	
Emma Lomax	1873	1963	English		
Celeste Jaguaribe de Matos Faria	1873	1938	Brazilian		
María de las Mercedes Adam de Aróstegui	1873	1957	Cuban		
Mary Carr Moore	1873	1957	American		
Henri Rabaud	1873	1949	French		
Walter Rabl	1873	1940	Austrian		Romanticism
Pascual Marquina Narro	1873	1948	Spanish		
Sergei Rachmaninoff	1873	1943	Russian	Piano Concerto No. 2 and No. 3; Rhapsody on a Theme of Paganini; Symphony No. 2; Prelude in C♯ minor	Romanticism, post-romanticism
Max Reger	1873	1916	German	organ music, Variations and Fugue on a Theme by Mozart, Hebbel Requiem	historicism, modernism
Jean Roger-Ducasse	1873	1954	French		
Arnold Safroni-Middleton	1873	1950	British		
Nikolai Tcherepnin	1873	1945	Russian		
David Vaughan Thomas	1873	1934	Welsh		
Pol Albrecht	1874	1975	Luxembourgish		
Eugénie-Victorine-Jeanne Alombert	1874	1964	French	Menuet champêtre	
Ernest Austin	1874	1947	English	Symphony	atonality, Romanticism, folk-influenced, impressionism
Edward Bairstow	1874	1946	English		
Ethel Barns	1874	1948	English		
Giulio Bas	1874	1929	Italian	Organ Sonata in F, XVI Preludi-Corali for organ	
George Botsford	1874	1949	American		ragtime
Katharine Emily Eggar	1874	1961	English		
Edmund Eysler	1874	1949	Austrian		
Reynaldo Hahn	1874	1947	Venezuelan/French	Ciboulette (Opera)	
Carl Cohn Haste	1874	1939	Danish		
Gustav Holst	1874	1934	English	The Planets; Beni Mora; Egdon Heath	
Charles Ives	1874	1954	American	The Unanswered Question; Central Park in the Dark; Variations on America; Three Places in New England; Concord Sonata	avant-garde, folk-influenced
Serge Koussevitzky	1874	1951	Russian		
Henri Marteau	1874	1934	French		
Oskar Nedbal	1874	1930	Czech		
František Neumann	1874	1929	Czech		
Arnold Schoenberg	1874	1951	Austrian	Gurre-Lieder; Verklärte Nacht; Variations for Orchestra; Pierrot Lunaire; Five Pieces for Orchestra; Violin Concerto	Romanticism, later expressionism and serialism; founder of the Second Viennese School
Josef Suk	1874	1935	Czech	Asrael Symphony; A Winter's Tale	
Franz Schmidt	1874	1939	Austrian	The Book with Seven Seals	
Franco Alfano	1875	1954	Italian		
Julián Carrillo	1875	1965	Mexican	Preludio a Colón; Misa de la Restauración dedicada a Juan XXIII	microtonal music
Samuel Coleridge-Taylor	1875	1912	English	The Song of Hiawatha (cantata)	
Mikalojus Konstantinas Čiurlionis	1875	1911	Lithuanian		
Ernesto De Curtis	1875	1937	Italian		
Reinhold Glière	1875	1956	Russian	Horn Concerto; The Red Poppy	Romanticism
Aleksandr Goldenweiser	1875	1961	Russian		
Dobri Hristov	1875	1941	Bulgarian		
Albert Ketelbey	1875	1959	English		
Jenő Huszka	1875	1960	Hungarian		
Fritz Kreisler	1875	1962	Austrian	Caprice Viennois; Liebesfreud; Liebesleid; Schön Rosmarin	
Marcel Labey	1875	1968	French		
Edgar Manas	1875	1964	Turkish		
Erkki Melartin	1875	1937	Finnish		
Adolf Mišek	1875	1955	Czech		
Maurice Ravel	1875	1937	French	Daphnis et Chloé; Valses nobles et sentimentales; Rapsodie espagnole; Tzigane; Piano Concerto; Bolero; piano music	impressionism, neoclassicism
Henriette Renié	1875	1956	French		
Cyril Rootham	1875	1938	English		
Lucia Contini Anselmi	1876	1913	Italian		
Hakon Børresen	1876	1954	Danish	The Royal Guest	romanticism
Havergal Brian	1876	1972	English	Gothic Symphony	
Edgar Bara	1876	1962	French		
John Alden Carpenter	1876	1951	American		
Pablo Casals	1876	1973	Spanish		
Jens Laursøn Emborg	1876	1957	Danish		
Manuel de Falla	1876	1946	Spanish	The Three-Cornered Hat; Nights in the Gardens of Spain	impressionism, neoclassicism
Josef Hofmann	1876	1957	Polish-American		
Mieczysław Karłowicz	1876	1909	Polish	Lithuanian Rhapsody, Stanislaw i Anna Oświęcimovie, Smutna opowieść; Symphony in E Minor; Violin Concerto	Romanticism
Filippo Tommaso Marinetti	1876	1944	Italian		
Fermo Dante Marchetti	1876	1940	Italian		
Ludolf Nielsen	1876	1939	Danish		
Armande de Polignac	1876	1962	French		
Teresa del Riego	1876	1968	English		
Carl Ruggles	1876	1971	American	Sun-Treader	
Mikhail Savoyarov	1876	1941	Russian	The Drunken Moon, Trumpeters, Because of the Ladies	chansonnier, light music, jazz-influenced
Ernest Schelling	1876	1939	American		
Grikor Suni	1876	1939	Armenian		
Ermanno Wolf-Ferrari	1876	1948	Italian		Comic operas
Antonio Russolo	1877	1942	Italian		
Russell Alexander	1877	1915	American		
Louis Aubert	1877	1968	French		
Sergei Bortkiewicz	1877	1952	Russian (Ukrainian-born)		Romanticism
Pavel Chesnokov	1877	1944	Russian		
Ernő Dohnányi	1877	1960	Hungarian	Variations on a Nursery Tune	Romanticism
Albert Dupuis	1877	1967	Belgian		
Alexander Goedicke	1877	1957	Russian		
Yevgeny Gunst	1877	1950	Russian		
Jean Huré	1877	1930	French		
Hans Jelmoli	1877	1936	Swiss		
Sigfrid Karg-Elert	1877	1933	German	66 Choral-Improvisationen for organ, Op. 65	
Hnat Khotkevych	1877	1938	Ukrainian		
Elisabeth Kuyper	1877	1953	Dutch	Violin Concerto in B minor, Violin Sonata in A major, Piano Trio in D major	
Mykola Leontovych	1877	1921	Ukrainian	Shchedryk, Church music, Arrangements of folk songs	A capella choral music
Roger Quilter	1877	1953	English	Songs	
Petar Stojanović	1877	1957	Serbian		
Vladimir Tsybin	1877	1949	Russian		
Jeanne Beijerman-Walraven	1878	1969	Dutch		
Rutland Boughton	1878	1960	English		
Fritz Brun	1878	1959	Swiss		
Eugenia Calosso	1878	1914	Italian		
Conrado del Campo	1878	1953	Spanish		
André Caplet	1878	1925	French		
Adam Carse	1878	1958	English	Two symphonies	
Mabel Wheeler Daniels	1878	1971	American		
Antun Dobronić	1878	1955	Croatian		
Gabriel Dupont	1878	1914	French		
Carl Ehrenberg	1878	1962	German	Anneliese (opera)	post-romanticism
Harry Farjeon	1878	1948	British		
Ossip Gabrilowitsch	1878	1936	Russian-born American		
Joseph Holbrooke	1878	1958	English		
Artur Kapp	1878	1952	Estonian		
Albert Mallinson	1878	1946	British		
Selim Palmgren	1878	1951	Finnish		
Caradog Roberts	1878	1935	Welsh		
Avery Robinson	1878	1965	American		
Franz Schreker	1878	1934	Austrian	Der ferne Klang (opera), Kammersymphonie	modernism, eclectic (Romanticism, naturalism, symbolism, impressionism, Expressionism and Neue Sachlichkeit)
Frank Bridge	1879	1941	English	Enter Spring; The Sea	impressionism, later expressionism; mentor of Benjamin Britten
Viggo Brodersen	1879	1965	Danish		
Joseph Canteloube	1879	1957	French	Chants d'Auvergne	
Paul Corder	1879	1942	English		
Jean Cras	1879	1932	French		
Maurice Delage	1879	1961	French	Quatre poèmes hindous; Sept haï-kaïs	impressionism, oriental-influenced
Stefano Donaudy	1879	1925	Italian		
Percy Fletcher	1879	1932	English		
Philippe Gaubert	1879	1941	French		
Gabriel Grovlez	1879	1944	French		
Joseph Haas	1879	1960	German		Romanticism
Hamilton Harty	1879	1941	Irish	An Irish Symphony; With the Wild Geese	
Josip Hatze	1879	1959	Croatian		
Edgar Henrichsen	1879	1955	Danish		
John Ireland	1879	1962	English	Piano Concerto in E♭	
Frank La Forge	1879	1953	American		
Nikolaos Lavdas	1879	1940	Greek		composer for mandolin orchestra
Pablo Luna	1879	1942	Spanish	El niño judío	
Stanyslav Lyudkevych	1879	1979	Ukrainian		
Carmela Mackenna	1879	1962	Chilean		
Jules Mazellier	1879	1959	French		
Joaquín Nin	1879	1949	Cuban		
Alma Mahler	1879	1964	Austrian		
Otto Olsson	1879	1964	Swedish	Te Deum	
Otakar Ostrčil	1879	1935	Czech		
Ottorino Respighi	1879	1936	Italian	The Fountains of Rome; The Pines of Rome	impressionism
Rudolf Sieczyński	1879	1952	Austrian		
Hugo Riesenfeld	1879	1939	Austrian-American		
Paul Rung-Keller	1879	1966	Danish		
Cyril Scott	1879	1970	English		
Johanna Senfter	1879	1961	German		
Marcel Tournier	1879	1951	French		
Richard Trunk	1879	1968	German		
Otakar Zich	1879	1934	Czech		
Rentarō Taki	1879	1903	Japanese		
Leo Ascher	1880	1942	Austrian		
Ernest Bloch	1880	1959	American (Swiss-born)	Schelomo; Suite hébraïque	
Edgar Thomas Cook	1880	1953	English		
Clara Edwards	1880	1974	American		
John Foulds	1880	1939	English	A World Requiem	Post-romanticism, Indian influence
Rudolf Karel	1880	1945	Czech		
Jan Kubelík	1880	1940	Czech		
Nikolai Medtner	1880	1951	Russian	38 Skazki for piano, Piano Concerto No. 3	Romanticism
Ildebrando Pizzetti	1880	1968	Italian	Assassinio nella cattedrale	
Ferdinand Rebay	1880	1953	Austrian		
Ivan Matetić Ronjgov	1880	1960	Croatian		
James Simon	1880	1944	German		
Robert Stolz	1880	1975	Austrian		
Guillermo Uribe Holguín	1880	1971	Colombian		
Clarence Cameron White	1880	1960	American		neoromantic
Healey Willan	1880	1968	English		
Francesco Balilla Pratella	1880	1955	Italian		
Domenico Alaleona	1881	1928	Italian		
Béla Bartók	1881	1945	Hungarian	Concerto for Orchestra; six string quartets; The Miraculous Mandarin; Piano Concerto No. 1; Piano Concerto No. 2; Piano Concerto No. 3; Music for Strings, Percussion and Celesta; Sonata for Two Pianos and Percussion	neoclassicism, folk-influenced
Theodor Blumer	1881	1964	German		
Gena Branscombe	1881	1977	Canadian		
Nancy Dalberg	1881	1949	Danish	String Quartet No. 2	
Fannie Charles Dillon	1881	1947	American		
Sem Dresden	1881	1957	Dutch		
George Enescu	1881	1955	Romanian	Romanian Rhapsody No. 1, Sonata No. 3 for Violin and Piano ("In the Romanian Popular Style"), Octet for Strings, String Quartet No. 2, Œdip (opera), Cantabile et Presto for flute and piano	folk-influenced; father of Romanian classical music
Henry Fillmore	1881	1956	American		marches
Jan van Gilse	1881	1944	Dutch	Thijl	
Peder Gram	1881	1956	Danish		
Richard Hageman	1881	1966	Dutch-born American		
Sigurd Islandsmoen	1881	1964	Norwegian		
Axel Jørgensen	1881	1947	Danish	Romance for Trombone and Piano	
Edvin Kallstenius	1881	1967	Swedish		
Paul Le Flem	1881	1984	French		
Arthur Marshall	1881	1968	American		
Nikolai Myaskovsky	1881	1950	Russian	Symphony No. 6, No. 10 and No. 13; Cello Concerto in C minor	Romanticism
Kenneth J. Alford	1881	1945	British	Colonel Bogey	"British March King"
Reine Colaço Osorio-Swaab	1881	1971	Dutch		
Nikolai Roslavets	1881	1944	Russian		
Ignatz Waghalter	1881	1949	Polish-German	Concerto for Violin in A Major; Mandragola; Jugend	Romanticism
Arthur Willner	1881	1959	Czech		
Hermann Zilcher	1881	1948	German		
Emil Ábrányi	1882	1970	Hungarian		
Marion Bauer	1882	1955	American		
Alberto Bimboni	1882	1960	Italian-born American		
Walter Braunfels	1882	1954	German	Organ Concerto	neotonality
Percy Grainger	1882	1961	Australian	Mock Morris, Colonial Song, Lincolnshire Posy	folk-influenced
Mary Howe	1882	1964	American		
Herbert Hughes	1882	1937	Irish		
Emmerich Kálmán	1882	1953	Hungarian	Operettas	
Zoltán Kodály	1882	1967	Hungarian	Háry János; Székelyfonó; Psalmus Hungaricus	folk-influenced
Nicholas Laucella	1882	1952	Italian-American	Mokanna – opera; Fantastic Overture; Nocturne for Orchestra; Consolva & The White House – Impressions of Norfolk – Symphonic poems; Divertimento for Flute, Oboe & English Horn; String Quartet	classical
Maurice Le Boucher	1882	1964	French		
Ernestina Lecuona y Casado	1882	1951	Cuban	Bolero	
Mary Lucas	1882	1952	English		
Gian Francesco Malipiero	1882	1973	Italian		
Joseph Marx	1882	1964	Austrian		vocal music
Geoffrey O'Hara	1882	1967	Canadian		
Manuel Ponce	1882	1948	Mexican	Concierto del Sur for guitar and orchestra, guitar and piano pieces, songs (especially "Estrellita"), and folk-song arrangements	
John Powell	1882	1963	American		
Mart Saar	1882	1963	Estonian		
Artur Schnabel	1882	1951	Austrian		
Lazare Saminsky	1882	1959	Russian		
Igor Stravinsky	1882	1971	Russian	The Rite of Spring; The Firebird; Petrushka; Pulcinella; The Soldier's Tale; Symphony of Psalms; Symphonies of Wind Instruments; Canticum Sacrum; Threni	neoclassicism, neotonality, later serialism, polystylism
Karol Szymanowski	1882	1937	Polish	Symphony No. 3 and No. 4; Violin Concerto No. 1 and No. 2	impressionism, later folk-influenced
Joaquín Turina	1882	1949	Spanish		
Ladislav Vycpálek	1882	1969	Czech		
Haydn Wood	1882	1959	English		
Maurice Abrahams	1883	1931	American		
Alexander Vasilyevich Alexandrov	1883	1946	Russian		
Emilius Bangert	1883	1962	Danish		
Augustin Barié	1883	1915	French		
Arnold Bax	1883	1953	English	Symphony No. 2, No. 3, and No. 6; Tintagel	Romanticism, impressionism
Alfredo Casella	1883	1947	Italian		
Alexandre Eugène Cellier	1883	1968	French		
Édouard Commette	1883	1967	French		
George Dyson	1883	1964	English	Symphony in G major	
Mikhail Gnessin	1883	1957	Russian		
Josef Matthias Hauer	1883	1959	Austrian		
Manuel Infante	1883	1958	Spanish		
Manolis Kalomiris	1883	1962	Greek		
Paul von Klenau	1883	1946	Danish		
Petar Konjović	1883	1970	Serbian		
Alexander Krein	1883	1951	Russian		
Luigi Russolo	1883	1947	Italian		futurism, noise music
Jan Kunc	1883	1976	Czech		
Toivo Kuula	1883	1918	Finnish		
Fran Lhotka	1883	1962	Czech-born Croatian		
Robert Graham Manson	1883	1950	British		
Romanos Melikian	1883	1935	Armenian		
Jules Van Nuffel	1883	1953	Belgian	In convertendo Dominus; Te Deum	
Ludomir Różycki	1883	1953	Polish		
Theophrastos Sakellaridis	1883	1950	Greek		
Maximilian Steinberg	1883	1946	Russian		
Fritz Stiedry	1883	1968	Austrian		
Peeter Süda	1883	1920	Estonian		
Enrico Toselli	1883	1926	Italian	Serenata 'Rimpianto' Op. 6 No. 1	
Dragica Legat Košmerl	1883	1956	Slovenian		
Edgard Varèse	1883	1965	French	Amériques; Ionisation; Arcana; Density 21.5	Musique concrète, Electronic music
Anton Webern	1883	1945	Austrian	Symphony; Six Pieces for Orchestra	twelve-tone technique, serialism, polystylism; pupil of Arnold Schoenberg
Bedřich Antonín Wiedermann	1883	1951	Czech		
Riccardo Zandonai	1883	1944	Italian		
Juhan Aavik	1884	1982	Estonian		
Dina Appeldoorn	1884	1938	Dutch		
Boris Asafyev	1884	1949	Russian		
Ralph Benatzky	1884	1957	Czech		
York Bowen	1884	1961	English		
May Brahe	1884	1956	Australian	Bless This House and other songs	
Max Brod	1884	1968	Czech		
Charles Griffes	1884	1920	American		
Louis Gruenberg	1884	1964	Russian	The Emperor Jones (opera)	
Juozas Gruodis	1884	1948	Lithuanian		
Marguerite Béclard d'Harcourt	1884	1964	French		
Jonny Heykens	1884	1945	Dutch		
Jurgis Karnavičius	1884	1941	Lithuanian		
Raoul Koczalski	1884	1948	Polish	Piano Concerto, Op. 83	
Boris Levenson	1884	1947	Russian-born American		
Ture Rangström	1884	1947	Swedish	four symphonies	
Jaime Teixidor	1884	1957	Spanish		
Wintter Watts	1884	1962	American		
Xiao Youmei	1884	1940	Chinese		
Alexander Albrecht	1885	1958	Slovak		
Pedro Humberto Allende	1885	1959	Chilean		
Agustín Barrios	1885	1944	Paraguayan		
Alban Berg	1885	1935	Austrian	Violin Concerto; Wozzeck; Lyric Suite	serialism, Romanticism, expressionism, polystylism; pupil of Arnold Schoenberg
George Butterworth	1885	1916	English		
Henri Collet	1885	1951	French		
Dimitrie Cuclin	1885	1978	Romanian		several exceptionally long symphonies
Benjamin Dale	1885	1943	English		
Ernest Farrar	1885	1918	English		
Julius Harrison	1885	1963	English		
Stevan Hristić	1885	1958	Serbian		
Werner Josten	1885	1963	German		
Heino Kaski	1885	1957	Finnish		
Eduard Künneke	1885	1953	German	Der Vetter aus Dingsda	
Artur Lemba	1885	1963	Estonian		
Adriano Lualdi	1885	1971	Italian		
Hildor Lundvik	1885	1951	Swedish		
Dora Pejačević	1885	1923	Croatian	Symphony in F♯ Minor, Phantasie Concertante	
Wallingford Riegger	1885	1961	American	Symphony No. 3	
Siegfried Salomon	1885	1962	Danish		
Carlos Salzedo	1885	1961	French		
James Scott	1885	1938	American		ragtime
Juhan Simm	1885	1959	Estonian		
Edith Swepstone	1885	1930	English		
Paul van Katwijk	1885	1974	Dutch-American		
Leó Weiner	1885	1960	Hungarian		
Egon Wellesz	1885	1974	Austrian	Nine symphonies	
Mana-Zucca	1885	1981	American		
Joseph Achron	1886	1943	Russian	Hebrew Melody	
Arseny Avraamov	1886	1944	Russian		avant-garde
Edward Ballantine	1886	1971	American	Variations on "Mary Had a Little Lamb" for piano	
John J. Becker	1886	1961	American		
Rebecca Clarke	1886	1979	English		
Eric Coates	1886	1957	English		
Ellen Coleman	1886	1973	English		
Edward Joseph Collins	1886	1951	American		
Marcel Dupré	1886	1971	French	Organ music	
Wilhelm Furtwängler	1886	1954	German	Symphony No. 1 in B minor, Symphony No. 2 in E minor, Symphony No. 3 in C♯ minor, Piano Quintet, Religöser Hymnus, Te Deum for Choir and Orchestra	neoclassicism, folk-influenced, twelve-tone technique
Henri Gagnebin	1886	1977	Belgian-born Swiss		
Carlo Giorgio Garofalo	1886	1962	Italian		
Jesús Guridi	1886	1961	Spanish	Sinfonia pirenaica	
Elizabeth Gyring	1886	1970	American		
Algot Haquinius	1886	1966	Swedish		
Jef van Hoof	1886	1959	Belgian		
Ethel Leginska	1886	1970	British		
Paul Paray	1886	1979	French	Mass for the 500th Anniversary of the Death of Joan of Arc	
Emilio Pujol	1886	1980	Spanish		
Othmar Schoeck	1886	1957	Swiss	Penthesilea	
Ole Windingstad	1886	1959	Norwegian-American		
Kōsaku Yamada	1886	1965	Japanese	Overture in D major	
Pietro Yon	1886	1943	Italian	Gesù bambino	
Willem Andriessen	1887	1964	Dutch	Piano Concerto in D♭ major	
Kurt Atterberg	1887	1974	Swedish	Symphony No. 6 "Dollar Symphony"	
Nadia Boulanger	1887	1979	French		
Nicolae Bretan	1887	1968	Romanian		
Lawrance Collingwood	1887	1982	English		
Mildred Couper	1887	1974	American		quarter tone
Heino Eller	1887	1970	Estonian		
Emilia Gubitosi	1887	1972	Italian		
Henry Ley	1887	1962	English		
Oskar Lindberg	1887	1955	Swedish		
Leevi Madetoja	1887	1947	Finnish	Symphony No. 1 (1916), Symphony No. 2 (1918), Symphony No. 3 (1926), the opera The Ostrobothnians (1923), the ballet-pantomime Okon Fuoko (1927), and Elegia (1909).	Student of Jean Sibelius, 1908–10.
Zorko Prelovec	1887	1939	Slovenian		
Florence Price	1887	1953	American		
Ernest Pingoud	1887	1942	Finnish		
Anatol Provazník	1887	1950	Czech		
Emil Reesen	1887	1964	Danish		Operas
Stasys Šimkus	1887	1943	Lithuanian		
Rudi Stephan	1887	1915	German		Romanticism
Heinz Tiessen	1887	1971	German		
Ernst Toch	1887	1964	German	7 symphonies	
Max Trapp	1887	1971	German		
Heitor Villa-Lobos	1887	1959	Brazilian	Chôros; Bachianas brasileiras; Magdalena: a Musical Adventure; Rudepoêma;	neoclassicism, folk-influenced
Anatoly Nikolayevich Alexandrov	1888	1982	Russian		
May Aufderheide	1888	1972	American		
Carmen Barradas	1888	1963	Uruguayan		
Vasyl Barvinsky	1888	1963	Ukrainian		
Johanna Beyer	1888	1944	German-American		
Emil Bohnke	1888	1928	German		
Ina Boyle	1888	1967	Irish		
Philip Greeley Clapp	1888	1954	American	12 symphonies	
Cecil Coles	1888	1918	Scottish		
Claude Delvincourt	1888	1954	French		
Ilse Fromm-Michaels	1888	1986	German		
Anna Maria Klechniowska	1888	1973	Polish		
Ion Nonna Otescu	1888	1940	Romanian		
Julie Reisserová	1888	1938	Czech		
Maria Rodrigo	1888	1967	Spanish		
Poul Schierbeck	1888	1949	Danish		
Alexei Stanchinsky	1888	1914	Russian		
Cristòfor Taltabull	1888	1964	Spanish		
Matthijs Vermeulen	1888	1967	Dutch	Seven symphonies	
Gabriel von Wayditch	1888	1969	Hungarian-American		
Emiliana de Zubeldia	1888	1987	Spanish		
Alton Adams	1889	1987	American		
Aksel Agerby	1889	1942	Danish		
Harald Agersnap	1889	1982	Danish		
Felix Arndt	1889	1918	American		
Grigoraș Dinicu	1889	1949	Romanian		
Armstrong Gibbs	1889	1960	English		
Ethel Glenn Hier	1889	1971	American		
Václav Kaprál	1889	1947	Czech		
Cyrillus Kreek	1889	1962	Estonian		
Egon Ledeč	1889	1944	Czech		
Rudolf Mauersberger	1889	1971	German		
Vilém Petrželka	1889	1969	Czech		
Karl Rautio	1889	1963	Finnish		
Levko Revutsky	1889	1977	Ukrainian	Piano Concerto in F major	
Francisco Santiago	1889	1947	Filipino		
Vladimir Shcherbachov	1889	1952	Russian		
Johannes Andersen	1890	1980	Danish		
Ernest Bullock	1890	1979	English		
Victor Dolidze	1890	1933	Soviet Georgian		
Samuil Feinberg	1890	1962	Russian and Soviet		
Luís de Freitas Branco	1890	1955	Portuguese		
Hans Gál	1890	1987	Austrian		
Carlos Gardel	1890	1935	French		
Ivor Gurney	1890	1937	English		
Pauline Hall	1890	1969	Norwegian		
Jacques Ibert	1890	1962	French	Concertino da camera; Escales	neoclassicism impressionism
Philip James	1890	1975	American		
Sándor Jemnitz	1890	1963	Hungarian		
Kathleen Lockhart Manning	1890	1951	American		
Frank Martin	1890	1974	Swiss	Ballade for flute and piano; Petite symphonie concertante; Requiem	
Bohuslav Martinů	1890	1959	Czech	Double Concerto for Two String Orchestras, Piano, and Timpani, Symphony No. 3, No. 4, and No. 6; operas Julietta and The Greek Passion; Gilgamesh (oratorio)	neoclassicism, folk-influenced
Yves Nat	1890	1956	French		
Gösta Nystroem	1890	1966	Swedish		
Eda Rapoport	1890	1968	American		
Morishige Takei	1890	1947	Japanese		
Otto Albert Tichý	1890	1973	Czech		
Roy Agnew	1891	1944	Australian		
Schahan Berberian	1891	1956	Armenian		
Arthur Bliss	1891	1975	English	A Colour Symphony	
Benjamin Burrows	1891	1966	English		
Claude Champagne	1891	1965	Canadian		
Noël Gallon	1891	1966	French		
Marcel Grandjany	1891	1975	French	Pieces for harp; Headed Harp Dept at Fontainebleau & Juilliard	Noted harpist and teacher
Thomas Griselle	1891	1955	American		
Karel Boleslav Jirák	1891	1972	Czechoslovak		
Mihail Jora	1891	1971	Romanian		
Alexander Kasyanov	1891	1982	Soviet Russian		
Frida Kern	1891	1988	Austrian		
Karl King	1891	1971	American	"Barnum and Bailey's Favorite"	Marches
Florentina Mallá	1891	1973	Czech		
Federico Moreno Tórroba	1891	1982	Spanish		classical guitar
Edmund Nick	1891	1974	German		
Sergei Prokofiev	1891	1953	Russian	Romeo and Juliet; The Love for Three Oranges; Classical Symphony; Symphony No. 5 and No. 6; Violin Concerto No. 1 and No. 2; Piano Concerto No. 2 and No. 3; Alexander Nevsky; Lieutenant Kijé; Peter and the Wolf	neoclassicism, Romanticism
Alexis Roland-Manuel	1891	1966	French		
Philip Sainton	1891	1967	British-French		
W. K. Stanton	1891	1978	English		
Richard Donovan	1891	1970	American		
Catherine Murphy Urner	1891	1942	American		
Paul Abraham	1892	1960	Hungarian		operettas
Isidor Achron	1892	1948	Polish		
Hendrik Andriessen	1892	1981	Dutch		father of Louis Andriessen
Samuel L. M. Barlow	1892	1982	American		
Johanna Bordewijk-Roepman	1892	1971	Dutch		
Hans Bottermund	1892	1949	German		
Augusto Brandt	1892	1942	Venezuelan		
Katherine Kennicott Davis	1892	1980	American		
Giorgio Federico Ghedini	1892	1965	Italian		
Ferde Grofé	1892	1972	American	Grand Canyon Suite; Mississippi Suite	
Ilmari Hannikainen	1892	1955	Finnish		Romanticism
Sandor Harmati	1892	1936	Hungarian-American		
Mirrie Hill	1892	1986	Australian		
Arthur Honegger	1892	1955	Swiss	Symphony No. 3 "Liturgique"; Pacific 231	neoclassicism; also a composer of film music: Les Misérables
Herbert Howells	1892	1983	English	Hymnus paradisi	
Frank Hutchens	1892	1965	Australian		
William G. James	1892	1977	Australian		
Knud Jeppesen	1892	1974	Danish		
Louise Lincoln Kerr	1892	1977	American		
Otakar Jeremiáš	1892	1962	Czech		
Yrjö Kilpinen	1892	1959	Finnish		neoclassical
Fritz Heinrich Klein	1892	1977	Austrian		
Jaroslav Kvapil	1892	1958	Czech		
László Lajtha	1892	1963	Hungarian		
Arthur Lourié	1892	1966	Russian		
Darius Milhaud	1892	1974	French	La Création du Monde; Le Bœuf sur le toit	jazz-influenced, neoclassical, polytonal
John Jacob Niles	1892	1980	American		
Nikolai Obukhov	1892	1954	Russian		
Felix Petyrek	1892	1951	Austrian		
Hilding Rosenberg	1892	1985	Swedish	Violin Concerto	
Kaikhosru Shapurji Sorabji	1892	1988	English	Opus clavicembalisticum; 100 Transcendental Studies; Sequentia cyclica super "Dies irae" ex Missa pro defunctis; Piano Symphony No. 2; "Gulistān" – Nocturne for Piano	neoclassical, neoromantic, postimpressionistic
Germaine Tailleferre	1892	1983	French		
Nicanor Abelardo	1893	1934	Filipino	Piano Concerto in B♭ minor	
Jean Absil	1893	1974	Belgian		
Arthur Benjamin	1893	1960	Australian	Jamaican Rhumba	
Georges Boulanger	1893	1958	Romanian		
Lili Boulanger	1893	1918	French		
Marta Canales	1893	1986	Chilean		
Osvald Chlubna	1893	1971	Czech		
Zinovy Feldman	1893	1942	Russian		
Aleksandr Gauk	1893	1963	Russian/Soviet		
Eugene Aynsley Goossens	1893	1962	English		
Dorothy Gow	1893	1982	English		
Hambarsoom Grigorian	1893	1975	Armenian		
Alois Hába	1893	1973	Czech	Matka	microtonal
Helen Eugenia Hagan	1893	1964	American		
Rued Langgaard	1893	1952	Danish	16 symphonies, The Music of the Spheres, Antikrist	
Franz Mittler	1893	1970	Austrian		
Federico Mompou	1893	1987	Spanish	piano music	
Douglas Moore	1893	1969	American	The Ballad of Baby Doe, The Devil and Daniel Webster (Folk opera)	
Ivor Novello	1893	1951	Welsh		
Leo Ornstein	1893	2002	American (Russian-born)	Wild Men's Dance, Suicide in an Airplane, 8 piano sonatas, Piano Quintet, 3 String Quartets	avant-garde, later neoromanticism
Charles Wilfred Orr	1893	1976	English	Songs	
Sergei Protopopov	1893	1954	Russian	3 piano sonatas	Avant-garde
Bernard Rogers	1893	1968	American		
John Laurence Seymour	1893	1986	American		
Marcel Tyberg	1893	1944	Austrian		
Stanisław Wiechowicz	1893	1963	Polish		
Pylyp Kozytskiy	1893	1960	Ukrainian	In memory of the Bolsheviks (1951)	avant-garde
Hugo Chaim Adler	1894	1955	Belgian		
Aaron Avshalomov	1894	1965	Russian		
Krešimir Baranović	1894	1975	Yugoslav		
Robert Russell Bennett	1894	1981	American	Broadway arrangements; pieces for band	
Pavel Bořkovec	1894	1972	Czech		
Paul Dessau	1894	1979	German		
Sabin Drăgoi	1894	1968	Romanian	Piano Concerto	
Kalitha Dorothy Fox	1894	1934	English		
Wilhelm Grosz	1894	1939	Austrian		
Žiga Hirschler	1894	1941	Croatian		
Edmund Jenkins	1894	1926	American		
Jane Joseph	1894	1929	English		
Filip Lazăr	1894	1936	Romanian		avant-garde
Ernest John Moeran	1894	1950	English	Symphony in G minor	folk-influenced
Antonio Molina	1894	1980	Filipino		
Willem Pijper	1894	1947	Dutch	Six Adagios; Piano Concerto	atonality
Walter Piston	1894	1976	American	The Incredible Flutist (ballet); Symphony No. 2, No. 3, No. 6, and No. 7	Neoclassicism
Władysław Raczkowski	1894	1959	Polish		
Erwin Schulhoff	1894	1942	Czech		
Nicolas Slonimsky	1894	1995	Russian-born American		
Albert Stoessel	1894	1943	American		
Bernard Wagenaar	1894	1971	Dutch/American		
Peter Warlock	1894	1930	Anglo-Welsh	Capriol Suite, The Curlew	
Vally Weigl	1894	1982	Austrian-American		
Mark Wessel	1894	1973	American	The King of Babylon; Concertino for Flute or Violin and Orchestra	
August Baeyens	1895	1966	Belgian		
Henriëtte Bosmans	1895	1952	Dutch		
Jorge Bravo de Rueda	1895	1940	Peruvian		
Bjarne Brustad	1895	1978	Norwegian		
Mario Castelnuovo-Tedesco	1895	1968	Italian	Naomi and Ruth; guitar music	
Juan José Castro	1895	1968	Argentine		
Ernest Charles	1895	1984	American		
Georges Dandelot	1895	1975	French		
Johann Nepomuk David	1895	1977	Austrian		neoclassical
Nico Dostal	1895	1981	Austrian		
Lindley Evans	1895	1982	South African-born Australian		
Jakov Gotovac	1895	1982	Croatian		
Ivo Tijardović	1895	1976	Croatian		
Paul Hindemith	1895	1963	German	Symphonic Metamorphosis of Themes by Carl Maria von Weber; Mathis der Maler; Ludus Tonalis	neoclassicism, Expressionism
Gordon Jacob	1895	1984	English		
Eva Jessye	1895	1992	American		
Rudolf Kattnigg	1895	1955	Austrian		
Ernesto Lecuona	1895	1963	Cuban		
Ernst Levy	1895	1981	Swiss		
Borys Lyatoshynsky	1895	1968	Ukrainian		
Carl Orff	1895	1982	German	Carmina Burana	polystylism
Slavko Osterc	1895	1941	Slovenian	Symphony	
Kathleen Richards	1895	1984	English		
Dane Rudhyar	1895	1985	French		
Boris Sobinov	1895	1956	Russian		
Leo Sowerby	1895	1968	American		
William Grant Still	1895	1978	American	5 symphonies, including Symphony No. 1 "Afro-American"; Troubled Island (opera), A Bayou Legend (opera)	folk-influenced; known as "the Dean" of African-American composers
Eduard Toldrà	1895	1962	Spanish		
Maria Bach	1896	1978	Austrian	Piano Quartet	
Erling Brene	1896	1980	Danish		
František Brož	1896	1962	Czech		
Shirley Graham Du Bois	1896	1977	American		
Amice Calverley	1896	1959	English-born Canadian	String Quartet in F minor; Variations on a Harmonic Theme	
Eduard Erdmann	1896	1958	German		
Jacobo Ficher	1896	1978	Argentine	10 symphonies; 3 piano concertos; chamber music; El Oso (opera, after Chekhov)	eclectic
Roberto Gerhard	1896	1970	Spanish		
Howard Hanson	1896	1981	American	7 symphonies	Romanticism
Józef Koffler	1896	1944	Polish		
Viktor Kosenko	1896	1938	Ukrainian	Piano concerto	
Dimitri Mitropoulos	1896	1960	Greek		
María Teresa Prieto	1896	1982	Spanish		
Jean Rivier	1896	1987	French		
Leroy Robertson	1896	1971	American		
Roger Sessions	1896	1985	American	9 symphonies, Violin Concerto, Montezuma	neoclassicism, twelve-tone technique
Petko Staynov	1896	1977	Bulgarian		
Bolesław Szabelski	1896	1979	Polish		
George Thalben-Ball	1896	1986	British		
Virgil Thomson	1896	1989	American	Four Saints in Three Acts, The Mother of Us All; Louisiana Story; also noted critic	folk-influenced, eclectic
Wladimir Vogel	1896	1984	Swiss		
Jaromír Weinberger	1896	1967	Czech	Schwanda the Bagpiper	
Sergei Aslamazyan	1897	1978	Armenian		
Břetislav Bakala	1897	1958	Czech		
Paul Ben-Haim	1897	1984	Israeli		
Jørgen Bentzon	1897	1951	Danish		
Gaspar Cassadó	1897	1966	Spanish	Toccata, Requiebros	
Henry Cowell	1897	1965	American	The Tides of Manaunaun, Dynamic Motion	eclectic, experimental
Oscar Lorenzo Fernández	1897	1948	Brazilian	"Batuque" from Malazarte	nationalism
António Fragoso	1897	1918	Portuguese		
Luis Gianneo	1897	1968	Argentine		
Sim Gokkes	1897	1943	Dutch		Modernist
Yefim Golyshev	1897	1970	Ukrainian	String Trio	
Hermann Heiss	1897	1966	German		
Harrison Kerr	1897	1978	American		
Erich Wolfgang Korngold	1897	1957	Austrian	Violin Concerto	also composed film music: Die Tote Stadt
György Kósa	1897	1984	Hungarian		
Agustín Lara	1897	1970	Mexican	Granada	
Theo Mackeben	1897	1953	German		
Enrico Mainardi	1897	1976	Italian		
Karl Marx	1897	1985	German		
Benna Moe	1897	1983	Danish		
Hermann Neuling	1897	1967	German		
Fernando Obradors	1897	1945	Spanish	Canciones clásicas españolas	
Quincy Porter	1897	1966	American	2 symphonies, 9 string quartets, Piano Quintet, Concerto concertante for two pianos and orchestra	
Jaroslav Řídký	1897	1956	Czech		
Knudåge Riisager	1897	1974	Denmark		
Harald Sæverud	1897	1992	Norwegian	Peer Gynt, 9 symphonies	
Pablo Sorozábal	1897	1988	Spanish		
Margaret Sutherland	1897	1984	Australian	Violin Concerto Haunted Hills	
Kay Swift	1897	1993	American		
Alexandre Tansman	1897	1986	French (Polish-born)		
Terig Tucci	1897	1973	Argentine		
Alexander Abramsky	1898	1985	Russian		folk-influenced
Thomas Armstrong	1898	1994	English		
Ernst Bacon	1898	1990	American		
Edward Boatner	1898	1981	American		
Carlton Cooley	1898	1981	American		
Norman Demuth	1898	1968	English		
Hanns Eisler	1898	1962	German/Austrian	Auferstanden aus Ruinen (Eastern Germany national anthem)	
George Gershwin	1898	1937	American	Rhapsody in Blue; Piano Concerto; An American in Paris; Porgy and Bess	jazz-influenced; also a composer of popular songs
Barbara Giuranna	1898	1998	Italian		
Ebbe Hamerik	1898	1951	Danish		
Roy Harris	1898	1979	American	Symphony No. 3	neotonality
Tibor Harsányi	1898	1954	Hungarian		
Alberto Hemsi	1898	1976	Turkish		
Dorothy Howell	1898	1982	English	Lamia	
Maurice Journeau	1898	1999	French		
Lev Knipper	1898	1974	Russian		
Jeanne Leleu	1898	1979	French		
Marcel Mihalovici	1898	1985	French (Romanian-born)	Krapp, ou, La dernière bande	neoclassicism, serialism, etc.; folk-influenced
Günther Ramin	1898	1956	German		
Vittorio Rieti	1898	1994	Italian		
Rito Selvaggi	1898	1972	Italian		
María Luisa Sepúlveda	1898	1958	Chilean		
Viktor Ullmann	1898	1944	Austrian		
Ephraim Amu	1899	1995	Ghanaian		
Georges Auric	1899	1983	French		
William Baines	1899	1922	English		
Mansi Barberis	1899	1986	Romanian		
Radie Britain	1899	1994	American		
Carlos Chávez	1899	1978	Mexican	Sinfonía de Antígona, Sinfonía india, Symphony No. 6, Toccata for percussion instruments, The Visitors (opera)	modernist, primitivist, folk-influenced, neoclassicism, serialist
Frederic Curzon	1899	1973	English		
Arthur Duff	1899	1956	Irish		
Sophie Carmen Eckhardt-Gramatté	1899	1974	Russian-born Canadian		
Yusef Greiss	1899	1961	Egyptian		
Patrick Hadley	1899	1973	British		
Pavel Haas	1899	1944	Czech		
Eduardo Hernández Moncada	1899	1995	Mexican		
Finn Høffding	1899	1997	Danish		
Albert Huybrechts	1899	1938	Belgian		
Hans Krása	1899	1944	Czech		
Ricard Lamote de Grignon	1899	1962	Spanish		
Jón Leifs	1899	1968	Icelandic	Oratorios based on Edda	idiosyncratic orchestration and percussion used to evoke Icelandic natural phenomena
Marcelle de Manziarly	1899	1989	French		
Harl McDonald	1899	1955	American		
George Frederick McKay	1899	1970	American		
Duke Ellington	1899	1974	American		
Francis Poulenc	1899	1963	French	Babar the Elephant; Flute Sonata; Stabat Mater	neoclassicism
Silvestre Revueltas	1899	1940	Mexican	Janitzio; Homenaje a Federico García Lorca; Sensemayá	nationalist, political music, primitivist, popular-music influence. modernism
Herbert Sumsion	1899	1995	English		
Alexander Tcherepnin	1899	1977	Russian		
Randall Thompson	1899	1984	American	Alleluia; The Testament of Freedom	
Pancho Vladigerov	1899	1978	Bulgarian	4 piano concertos	folk-influenced
Franz Salmhofer	1900	1975	Austrian	Lieder: Heiteres Herbarium	Late romantic / progressive
Evald Aav	1900	1939	Estonian		
Kai Normann Andersen	1900	1967	Danish		
George Antheil	1900	1959	American	Ballet mécanique; Symphony No. 4	avant-garde, modernism, later neoclassical
Henry Barraud	1900	1997	French	Concertino for piano, flute, clarinet, horn, bassoon and chamber orchestra	
Nicolai Berezowsky	1900	1953	Russian-American	Christmas Festival Overture (Ukrainian Noel), Duo for Clarinet and Viola	
Willy Burkhard	1900	1955	Swiss		
Alan Bush	1900	1995	English		
Lola Castegnaro	1900	1979	Costa Rican		
Niels Clemmensen	1900	1950	Danish		
Aaron Copland	1900	1990	American	Appalachian Spring (ballet); Billy the Kid (ballet); Rodeo (ballet); Fanfare for the Common Man; Clarinet Concerto; Lincoln Portrait	neoclassical, folk-influenced, jazz-influenced, early twelve-tone, later serialism
Isaak Dunayevsky	1900	1955	Russian		
Pierre-Octave Ferroud	1900	1936	French		
Isadore Freed	1900	1960	Belarusian-born American		
Grigori Gamburg	1900	1967	Russian		
Hector Gratton	1900	1970	Canadian		
Gotfrid Hasanov	1900	1965	Russian		
Hans Haug	1900	1967	Swiss		
Michael Head	1900	1976	British		
Maurice Jaubert	1900	1940	French		
Yasuji Kiyose	1900	1981	Japanese		
Uuno Klami	1900	1961	Finnish	Sea Pictures; Kalevala Suite	
Paul Kletzki	1900	1973	Polish		
Ernst Krenek	1900	1991	Austrian	Jonny spielt auf, Karl V	neoclassical, twelve-tone, later serial, neoromantic, eclectic
Otto Luening	1900	1996	American		
Colin McPhee	1900	1964	Canadian	Tabuh-Tabuhan: Toccata for Orchestra	folk-influenced
Alexander Mosolov	1900	1973	Russian	Iron Foundry	avant-garde
Henri Pensis	1900	1958	Luxembourger		
Fred Raymond	1900	1954	Austrian		operettas; also composed film music
Hermann Reutter	1900	1985	German		
Amadeo Roldán	1900	1939	Cuban	Rítmicas Nos. 5 and 6	
Hans Schimmerling	1900	1967	Czech		
Bernd Scholz	1900	1969	German		
Leo Smit	1900	1943	Dutch		
Marko Tajčević	1900	1984	Serbian		
Zdenka Ticharich	1900	1979	Hungarian		
Elinor Remick Warren	1900	1991	American		
Kurt Weill	1900	1950	German/American	2 symphonies; String Quartets; "Die Dreigroschenoper"; Aufstieg und Fall der Stadt Mahagonny; "Mahagonny-Songspiel"; several Broadway musicals	neoclassical
David Wynne	1900	1983	Welsh		
Walther Aeschbacher	1901	1969	Swiss		
Karel Albert	1901	1987	Belgian	Marieken van Niemeghen (incidental music); four symphonies	constructionist, neoclassical, twelve-tone technique
Blaž Arnič	1901	1970	Slovenian		neoromanticism
Conrad Beck	1901	1989	Swiss		
Ruth Crawford Seeger	1901	1953	American	String Quartet	modernism
Gerald Finzi	1901	1956	English	Cello Concerto; songs	neoromantic
Lillian Fuchs	1901	1995	American		
Eivind Groven	1901	1977	Norwegian		
Povl Hamburger	1901	1972	Danish		
Victor Hely-Hutchinson	1901	1947	British		
Emil Hlobil	1901	1987	Czech		
Dorothy James	1901	1982	American		
Olav Kielland	1901	1985	Norwegian		
Boris Koutzen	1901	1966	Russian-American		
Rudolf Matz	1901	1988	Croatian		
William McKie	1901	1984	Australian		
Dimitar Nenov	1901	1953	Bulgarian	Toccata	
Harry Partch	1901	1974	American	Daphne of the Dunes, Revelation in the Courthouse Park	microtonal, just intonation, self-built instruments
Juan Carlos Paz	1901	1972	Argentine		twelve-tone technique and serialism
Marcel Poot	1901	1988	Belgian		
Bernard Reichel	1901	1992	Swiss		
Joaquín Rodrigo	1901	1999	Spanish	Concierto de Aranjuez; guitar music	neoclassical, folk music influence
Heinz Eric Roemheld	1901	1985	American		
Kjell Roikjer	1901	1999	Danish		
Edmund Rubbra	1901	1986	English		
Henri Sauguet	1901	1989	French		
Henri Tomasi	1901	1971	French		
Emmy Wegener	1901	1973	Dutch		
Werner Egk	1901	1983	German		
Jesús Arámbarri	1902	1960	Spanish		
Theodore Chanler	1902	1961	American		
Maurice Duruflé	1902	1986	French	Requiem; organ music	
Vladimir Fere	1902	1971	Russian		
Evaristo Fernández Blanco	1902	1993	Spanish		
Lūcija Garūta	1902	1977	Latvian	Piano Concerto	
Antonio José	1902	1936	Spanish		
Helvi Leiviskä	1902	1982	Finnish		
Lino Liviabella	1902	1964	Italian		
Jiro Nakano	1902	2000	Japanese		
Vissarion Shebalin	1902	1963	Russian	The Taming of the Shrew (opera)	
Andriy Shtoharenko	1902	1992	Ukrainian		
Veselin Stoyanov	1902	1969	Bulgarian	Three concertos for piano and orchestra; Concerto for Violin and Orchestra, Concerto for Cello and Orchestra, Concertino for violin	folk-influenced
Jenő Takács	1902	2005	Austrian		
Rose Thisse-Derouette	1902	1989	Belgian		
Antonio María Valencia	1902	1952	Colombian		
John Vincent	1902	1977	American	Consort for Piano and Strings	neoclassical
William Walton	1902	1983	English	Symphony No. 1; Violin Concerto; Viola Concerto; Variations on a Theme by Hindemith; Belshazzar's Feast (oratorio)	avant-garde (early), neoromantic, neoclassical; also a composer of film music
Meredith Willson	1902	1984	American		
Stefan Wolpe	1902	1972	German	Battle Piece for piano	serial, modernism
Claude Arrieu	1903	1990	French		
Lennox Berkeley	1903	1989	English	Horn Trio	neoclassical, later serial
Boris Blacher	1903	1975	German		
Abram Chasins	1903	1987	American	Two piano concertos; Parade for orchestra	
Tudor Ciortea	1903	1983	Romanian		
Rhoda Coghill	1903	2000	Irish		
Avril Coleridge-Taylor	1903	1998	English		
Hugo Distler	1908	1942	German		
Vernon Duke	1903	1969	Russian		both post-tonal style as Dukelsky and in the style of Tin Pan Alley as Duke
André Fleury	1903	1995	French		
Vittorio Giannini	1903	1966	Italian	Blennerhassett	neoclassical
Walter Goehr	1903	1960	German		
Berthold Goldschmidt	1903	1996	German		
Hilding Hallnäs	1903	1984	Swedish		
He Luting	1903	1999	Chinese		
Vladimir Horowitz	1903	1989	American		
Jens Bjerre Jacobsen	1903	1986	Danish		
Aram Khachaturian	1903	1978	Armenian	Gayane (ballet, includes Sabre Dance); Spartacus (ballet); concertos; Masquerade Suite	
Mykola Kolessa	1903	2006	Ukrainian		
Marc Lavry	1903	1967	Israeli	Symphonic Poem Emek, Opera Dan Hashomer	
Leighton Lucas	1903	1982	English		
Robin Milford	1903	1959	English		
Saburō Moroi	1903	1977	Japanese		
Ervin Nyiregyházi	1903	1987	Hungarian		Romanticism
Carl Gustav Sparre Olsen	1903	1984	Norwegian		
Flor Peeters	1903	1986	Belgian		
Mario Pilati	1903	1938	Italian	Piedigrotta (opera)	
Thomas Pitfield	1903	1999	British		
Priaulx Rainier	1903	1986	South African / English	Ploërmel, Quanta, String Trio	
Günter Raphael	1903	1960	German		
Luis H. Salgado	1903	1977	Ecuadorian	Sanjuanito futurista; Eunice; Cumandá	folk-influenced, modernist
Åke Uddén	1903	1987	Swedish		
Vladimir Vlasov	1903	1986	Russian		
Rudolf Wagner-Régeny	1903	1969	German	Prometheus (opera)	
Percy Whitlock	1903	1946	English		
Richard Addinsell	1904	1977	British	Warsaw Concerto	
Joseph Ahrens	1904	1997	German		
Herbert Kennedy Andrews	1904	1965	English		
John Antill	1904	1986	Australian	Corroboree (ballet suite)	
Jean Berveiller	1904	1976	French		
Walter Bricht	1904	1970	Austrian		
Antonino Buenaventura	1904	1996	Filipino		
Erik Chisholm	1904	1965	Scottish	Piano Concerto No. 2 ("Hindustani")	"Scotland's forgotten composer", nicknamed "MacBartok"
Karl Clausen	1904	1972	Danish		
Luigi Dallapiccola	1904	1975	Italian	Il prigioniero (opera); Il canto sospeso	serialism, electronic music
Balys Dvarionas	1904	1974	Lithuanian		
Kunihiko Hashimoto	1904	1949	Japanese		
Huang Tzu	1904	1938	Chinese	In Memoriam	
Dmitry Kabalevsky	1904	1987	Russian	The Comedians	
Tadeusz Kassern	1904	1957	Polish		
Iša Krejčí	1904	1968	Czech	20 Variations on the Composer s Own Theme in the Style of a Folk Song	neoclassical
Goffredo Petrassi	1904	2003	Italian		
Gavriil Popov	1904	1972	Russian	Chamber Symphony; Symphony No. 1	
Cemal Reşit Rey	1904	1985	Turkish		
Manuel Rosenthal	1904	2003	French		
Theodor Schaefer	1904	1969	Czech		
Hermann Schroeder	1904	1984	German		
Nikos Skalkottas	1904	1949	Greek	36 Greek Dances for orchestra; Violin Concerto	twelve-tone, folk music influence, modernism
Franz Syberg	1904	1955	Danish		
Jack Westrup	1904	1975	English		
Konrad Wölki	1904	1983	German		
Aleksey Zhivotov	1904	1964	Russian		
Heikki Aaltoila	1905	1992	Finnish		
William Alwyn	1905	1985	English	Lyra Angelica; Elizabethan Dances	neoromantic
Boris Arapov	1905	1992	Russian	Violin Concerto	neoromantic, atonality
Albert Arlen	1905	1993	Turkish Australian		
Paul Arma	1905	1987	Hungarian-French		
Vytautas Bacevičius	1905	1970	Lithuanian		atonality
Marc Blitzstein	1905	1964	American	The Cradle Will Rock (musical)	political music
Eugène Bozza	1905	1991	French		
Mario Braggiotti	1905	1996	American (Italian-born)		
Yevgeny Brusilovsky	1905	1981	Kazakhstani		
Francis Chagrin	1905	1972	Romanian		
Ulric Cole	1905	1992	American		
Christian Darnton	1905	1981	British		
Ferenc Farkas	1905	2000	Hungarian		
Karl Amadeus Hartmann	1905	1963	German	Concerto funebre; Gesangsszene; Symphony No. 1; Symphony No. 4	
André Hossein	1905	1983	Iranian		
André Jolivet	1905	1974	French	Flute Concerto No. 1	
Erich Itor Kahn	1905	1956	German		
Taneli Kuusisto	1905	1988	Finnish		
Constant Lambert	1905	1951	English	The Rio Grande	popular music influence, jazz influence
Guillaume Landré	1905	1968	Dutch		
Walter Leigh	1905	1942	English	Concertino for Harpsichord and Strings; Agincourt; Jolly Roger; Music for Strings	neoclassical
Ernst Hermann Meyer	1905	1988	German		
Léon Orthel	1905	1987	Dutch		
Alan Rawsthorne	1905	1971	English	3 symphonies; Symphonic Studies	neoclassical
Luis Sandi	1905	1996	Mexican		
Giacinto Scelsi	1905	1988	Italian	Quattro pezzi chiascuno su una nota sola	
Verdina Shlonsky	1905	1990	Israeli	Piano Concerto; String Quartet; numerous piano music, including Pages from the Diary; Five Sketches; Youth Suite; Reflection; Still Life	Polystylism
Fela Sowande	1905	1987	Nigerian		
Daniel Sternefeld	1905	1986	Belgian		
Michael Tippett	1905	1998	English	The Midsummer Marriage; 4 symphonies; A Child of Our Time (oratorio)	
Eduard Tubin	1905	1982	Estonian	11 symphonies	
Xian Xinghai	1905	1945	Chinese	Yellow River Cantata	
Xiao Shuxian	1905	1991	Chinese		
Winfried Zillig	1905	1963	German		
Murray Adaskin	1906	2002	Canadian		
Ahn Eak-tai	1906	1965	Korean	Aegukga	
Hasan Ferit Alnar	1906	1978	Turkish		
Daniel Ayala Pérez	1906	1975	Mexican	Tribu (symphonic poem)	
Andria Balanchivadze	1906	1992	Georgian		
Franz Biebl	1906	2001	German	Ave Maria	
Walter Braithwaite	1906	1991	English		
Pierre Capdevielle	1906	1969	French		
Bernhard Christensen	1906	2004	Danish		
Alessandro Cicognini	1906	1995	Italian		
Milo Cipra	1906	1985	Croatian		
Arnold Cooke	1906	2005	British		
Paul Creston	1906	1985	American		neoclassical
Volfgangs Dārziņš	1906	1962	Latvian		
Claire Delbos	1906	1959	French		
Antal Doráti	1906	1988	American		
Klaus Egge	1906	1979	Norwegian		
Will Eisenmann	1906	1992	German-Swiss		
Ulvi Cemal Erkin	1906	1972	Turkish		
Eric Fenby	1906	1997	English		
Armando José Fernandes	1906	1983	Portuguese		neoclassical
Benjamin Frankel	1906	1973	English		
Giovanni Fusco	1906	1968	Italian		
Alejandro García Caturla	1906	1940	Cuban		
Zoltán Gárdonyi	1906	1986	Hungarian	Psalm 46, organ sonatas, motets	sacred music
Miriam Gideon	1906	1996	American		modernism
Radamés Gnattali	1906	1988	Brazilian		
Philip Herschkowitz	1906	1989	Romanian		atonality, twelve-tone technique pupil of Alban Berg & Anton Webern
Willy Hess	1906	1997	Swiss		
Joaquim Homs	1906	2003	Spanish		
Tomojirō Ikenouchi	1906	1991	Japanese		
Jānis Ivanovs	1906	1983	Latvian		neoromantic
Maxime Jacob	1906	1977	French		
Jaroslav Ježek	1906	1942	Czech		
Eugen Kapp	1906	1996	Estonian		
Jacques Leguerney	1906	1997	French		
Oscar Levant	1906	1972	American		
Zara Levina	1906	1976	Ukrainian		
Normand Lockwood	1906	2002	American		
Fernando Lopes-Graça	1906	1994	Portuguese		
Elisabeth Lutyens	1906	1983	English		
Abdylas Maldybaev	1906	1978	Kyrgyzstani		
Peter Mieg	1906	1990	Swiss		neoclassical
Alexander Moyzes	1906	1984	Slovak		neoromantic
Willson Osborne	1906	1979	American		neoclassical
Carmelo Pace	1906	1993	Maltese		
Boris Papandopulo	1906	1991	Croatian		
Ludovit Rajter	1906	2000	Slovak		
Dmitri Shostakovich	1906	1975	Russian	15 symphonies, including No. 5, No. 7, No. 9, No. 10, and No. 11; Violin Concerto No. 1; Cello Concerto No. 1; Festive Overture; 15 string quartets, including String Quartet No. 8; Piano Quintet; The Gadfly Suite	modernism, neoclassical, neoromantic, polystylism
Berta Alves de Sousa	1906	1997	Portuguese		
Leopold Spinner	1906	1980	Ukrainian		
Louise Talma	1906	1996	American		
Teng Yu-hsien	1906	1944	Taiwanese		
Johannes Paul Thilman	1906	1973	German		
David Van Vactor	1906	1994	American		
Grace Williams	1906	1977	Welsh		
Lora Aborn	1907	2005	American	Toccata for Piano	folk-influenced
Kurken Alemshah	1907	1947	Armenian		
Henk Badings	1907	1987	Dutch		
Günter Bialas	1907	1995	German		
Yvonne Desportes	1907	1993	French		
Roy Douglas	1907	2015	British		
Federico Elizalde	1907	1979	Filipino-Spanish	Concertos, symphonic poems	
Wolfgang Fortner	1907	1987	German	Bluthochzeit (opera)	
Koharik Gazarossian	1907	1967	Armenian		
Camargo Guarnieri	1907	1993	Brazilian	Dansa brasileira, Pedro Malazarte (opera), Suite IV Centenário	nationalism, neoclassicism, twelve-tone technique
Gene Gutchë	1907	2000	German		
Heinz Friedrich Hartig	1907	1969	German		
Karl Höller	1907	1987	German		
Imogen Holst	1907	1984	British		
Jeronimas Kačinskas	1907	2005	Lithuanian-born American		
Walter Kaufmann	1907	1984	Czech		
Jean Langlais	1907	1991	French		
Elizabeth Maconchy	1907	1994	English	Quintet for oboe and strings; 13 string quartets	
Yoritsune Matsudaira	1907	2001	Japanese		
Otto Mortensen	1907	1986	Danish		
Zygmunt Mycielski	1907	1987	Polish		
Roman Palester	1907	1989	Polish		
Ödön Pártos	1907	1977	Hungarian-Israeli		
Maria Teresa Pelegrí i Marimón	1907	1995	Spanish		
Burrill Phillips	1907	1988	American	Selections from McGuffey's Reader	
Hisato Ohzawa	1907	1953	Japanese		
Willem van Otterloo	1907	1978	Dutch		
Harilaos Perpessas	1907	1995	Greek	Christus Symphony	
Miklós Rózsa	1907	1995	Hungarian		folk-influenced
Tolibjon Sadikov	1907	1957	Uzbekistani		
Ahmed Adnan Saygun	1907	1991	Turkish		
Martin Scherber	1907	1974	German		
Howard Swanson	1907	1978	American	Short Symphony; The Negro Speaks of Rivers	neoclassical
Václav Trojan	1907	1983	Czech		
Georges Tzipine	1907	1987	French		
Alec Wilder	1907	1980	American		
Necil Kazım Akses	1908	1999	Turkish		
Leroy Anderson	1908	1975	American	Sleigh Ride; Blue Tango; Jazz Pizzicato; Irish Suite; Suites of Carols	
Menachem Avidom	1908	1995	Israeli		
Jan Zdeněk Bartoš	1908	1981	Czech		
Joseph Beer	1908	1987	German		
Roberta Bitgood	1908	2007	American		
Elliott Carter	1908	2012	American	Variations for Orchestra; A Symphony of Three Orchestras; 5 string quartets	neoclassical (early), modernist
Jean Coulthard	1908	2000	Canadian		
Jean-Yves Daniel-Lesur	1908	2002	French		
Gustav Ernesaks	1908	1993	Estonian		
Howard Ferguson	1908	1999	British		
Gunnar de Frumerie	1908	1987	Swedish		
Helen Glatz	1908	1996	English		
Irwin Heilner	1908	1991	American		
Kurt Hessenberg	1908	1994	German		
Miloslav Kabeláč	1908	1979	Czech		
Herman David Koppel	1908	1998	Danish		neoclassical
Lars-Erik Larsson	1908	1986	Swedish		
Joan Mary Last	1908	2002	English		
Nina Makarova	1908	1976	Russian		
Lucien Martin	1908	1950	Canadian		
Olivier Messiaen	1908	1992	French	Turangalila Symphony; Quartet for the End of Time; Vingt regards sur l'enfant-Jésus; Saint François d'Assise	mysticism, postimpressionist
Vano Muradeli	1908	1970	Soviet Georgian		
Trude Rittmann	1908	2005	German		
Alice Samter	1908	2004	German		
Julian Scriabin	1908	1919	Russian		
Halsey Stevens	1908	1989	American		
Eugen Suchoň	1908	1993	Slovak		folk-influenced
Jonas Švedas	1908	1971	Lithuanian		
Sidney Torch	1908	1990	British		
Geirr Tveitt	1908	1981	Norwegian		folk-influenced
William Wordsworth	1908	1988	Scottish		
Lorenc Antoni	1909	1991	Kosovo Albanian		
Isabel Aretz	1909	2005	Argentine-Venezuelan		
Grażyna Bacewicz	1909	1969	Polish	String Quartet No. 3	
Gunnar Berg	1909	1989	Danish (Swiss-born)	Suite for cello	serialism
Jean Berger	1909	2002	American (German-born)		
Paul Constantinescu	1909	1963	Romanian		
Václav Dobiáš	1909	1978	Czech		
Jaroslav Doubrava	1909	1960	Czech		
Maria Dziewulska	1909	2006	Polish		
Harald Genzmer	1909	2007	German		neoclassicism
Isador Goodman	1909	1982	South African-Australian		
Richard de Guide	1909	1962	Belgian	3 symphonies, choral works, songs for voice and piano, a concerto for the piano and chamber works	
Vagn Holmboe	1909	1996	Danish	13 symphonies	neoclassicism
Koichi Kishi	1909	1937	Japanese		
Angelo Francesco Lavagnino	1909	1987	Italian		
Primitivo Lázaro	1909	1997	Spanish		
Ljubica Marić	1909	2003	Serb	Sounds of Space; Ostinato Super Thema Octoicha; Threshold of Dream	post-modernism
Charles Naginski	1909	1940	American		
Paul Nordoff	1909	1977	American		
Robin Orr	1909	2006	Scottish		
Kurt Schwaen	1909	2007	German		neoclassicism
Elie Siegmeister	1909	1991	American	9 operas; 8 symphonies; Western Suite	
Todor Skalovski	1909	2004	Macedonian		
Ādolfs Skulte	1909	2000	Latvian		
Ignace Strasfogel	1909	1994	Polish		
Dana Suesse	1909	1987	American		
Asaf Zeynally	1909	1932	Azerbaijani		
Erkki Aaltonen	1910	1990	Finnish		
Samuel Barber	1910	1981	American	Adagio for Strings; Violin Concerto; Symphony in One Movement; Vanessa	Romanticism
Willy Berking	1910	1979	German		
Herman Berlinski	1910	2001	German-born American		
Miguel Bernal Jiménez	1910	1956	Mexican		
Ronald Binge	1910	1979	British		light music
Patricia Blomfield Holt	1910	2003	Canadian		
Paul Bowles	1910	1999	American		
Henri Challan	1910	1977	French		
Salvador Contreras	1910	1982	Mexican	String Quartet No. 2; Tres movimientos para guitarra; Dos piezas dodecafónicas	neoclassical, serial
Francis Judd Cooke	1910	1995	American		
Farid El-Atrache	1910	1974	Syrian-Egyptian		
Blas Galindo	1910	1993	Mexican	Sones de Mariachi	
Remo Giazotto	1910	1998	Italian	Adagio attributed to Albinoni	
Evgeny Golubev	1910	1988	Russian		
Bernhard Heiden	1910	2000	German-American		
Gerard Hengeveld	1910	2001	Dutch		
Mohamed Jamoussi	1910	1982	Tunisian		
Jiang Wen-Ye	1910	1983	Chinese		
Otto Joachim	1910	2010	German-born Canadian		electronic music
Charles Jones	1910	1997	Canadian		
Abu Bakr Khairat	1910	1963	Egyptian		
Erland von Koch	1910	2009	Swedish		
Pierre Lantier	1910	1998	French		
Rolf Liebermann	1910	1999	Swiss	Leonore 40/45 (opera); Concerto for Jazzband and Symphony Orchestra	
Jean Martinon	1910	1976	French		
Paule Maurice	1910	1967	French		
Alfred Mendelssohn	1910	1966	Romanian		
Herbert Owen Reed	1910	2014	American	La Fiesta Mexicana	folk-influenced
William Reed	1910	2002	English		
Karel Reiner	1910	1979	Czech		
Pierre Schaeffer	1910	1995	French		Musique concrète
Friedrich Schröder	1910	1972	German		light music
William Schuman	1910	1992	American	New England Triptych; Symphony No. 6	
Meinrad Schütter	1910	2006	Swiss		
Leon Stein	1910	2002	American		
Robert Still	1910	1971	English		
Soulima Stravinsky	1910	1994	Swiss-American		
Heinrich Sutermeister	1910	1995	Swiss		
Josef Tal	1910	2008	Israeli	7 operas; 6 symphonies; 13 concerti	
Stanley Vann	1910	2010	English		
Jehan Alain	1911	1940	French	Litanies (organ)	
René Amengual	1911	1954	Chilean		
José Ardévol	1911	1981	Cuban	3 symphonies	atonality
Stanley Bate	1911	1959	English		
Jeanne Behrend	1911	1988	American		
Paul Burkhard	1911	1977	Swiss		
Ján Cikker	1911	1989	Slovak		folk-influenced
Gábor Darvas	1911	1985	Hungarian		electronic music
Ding Shande	1911	1995	Chinese	Long March Symphony	
Mark Fax	1911	1974	American		
Roberto García Morillo	1911	2003	Argentine		
Jean-Jacques Grunenwald	1911	1982	French		
Bernard Herrmann	1911	1975	American	Wuthering Heights	
Alan Hovhaness	1911	2000	Armenian-American	67 numbered symphonies including Mysterious Mountain; And God Created Great Whales (taped whale sounds and orchestra); Fantasy on Japanese Woodprints	
Kikuko Kanai	1911	1986	Japanese		
Jan Koetsier	1911	2006	Dutch		
Vilho Luolajan-Mikkola	1911	2005	Finnish		
Frederick May	1911	1985	Irish		
Robert McBride	1911	2007	American		
Gian Carlo Menotti	1911	2007	Italian	The Medium; The Consul; Amahl and the Night Visitors	
Anne-Marie Ørbeck	1911	1996	Norwegian		
Allan Pettersson	1911	1980	Swedish	Barefoot Songs; Symphony No. 9	
Eduard Pütz	1911	2000	German		
Franz Reizenstein	1911	1968	German-born British		
Nino Rota	1911	1979	Italian		
Ananda Samarakoon	1911	1962	Sri Lankan		
Endre Szervánszky	1911	1977	Hungarian		
Władysław Szpilman	1911	2000	Polish		
Tan Xiaolin	1911	1948	Chinese		
Vladimir Ussachevsky	1911	1990	American		
Hans Vogt	1911	1992	German	Die Stadt hinter dem Strom (opera), Requiem	
Eberhard Werdin	1911	1991	German		
Bojan Adamič	1912	1995	Slovenian		
Mukhtar Ashrafi	1912	1975	Uzbekistani		
Wayne Barlow	1912	1996	American	The Winter's Passed, for oboe and string orchestra; Hampton Beach Overture; Sinfonia da camera	
Arthur Berger	1912	2003	American		
John Cage	1912	1992	American	4'33"; Sonatas and Interludes	Aleatoric music, extended technique, prepared piano
Ingolf Dahl	1912	1970	German-born American		
Alfred Desenclos	1912	1971	French		
Rudolf George Escher	1912	1980	Dutch		
Arkady Filippenko	1912	1983	Ukrainian		
Jean Françaix	1912	1997	French	Clarinet Concerto; Two-Piano Concerto	neoclassicism
Don Gillis	1912	1978	American	Symphony No. 5½	
Peggy Glanville-Hicks	1912	1990	Australian		
Carlos Guastavino	1912	2000	Argentine		
Johana Harris	1912	1995	Canadian		
Gisela Hernández	1912	1971	Cuban		
Robert Hughes	1912	2007	Scottish-born Australian		
Daniel Jones	1912	1993	Welsh		
Sirvart Kalpakyan Karamanuk	1912	2008	Armenian		
Felipe Padilla de León	1912	1992	Filipino		
Ma Sicong	1912	1987	Chinese		
Igor Markevitch	1912	1983	Ukrainian		
Tauno Marttinen	1912	2008	Finnish		
José Pablo Moncayo	1912	1958	Mexican	Huapango	
Xavier Montsalvatge	1912	2002	Spanish		
Conlon Nancarrow	1912	1997	American-Mexican	Studies for player-piano	
Nie Er	1912	1935	Chinese		folk-influenced
Barbara Pentland	1912	2000	Canadian		
Sergiu Celibidache	1912	1996	Romanian	Der Taschengarten	Neoclassicism
Zoltán Pongrácz	1912	2007	Hungarian		
Vadim Salmanov	1912	1978	Russian	Symphony No. 2	
Jadwiga Szajna-Lewandowska	1912	1994	Polish		
Jiří Traxler	1912	2011	Czech		
Günter Wand	1912	2002	German		
Milton Adolphus	1913	1988	American		
Violet Archer	1913	2000	Canadian		
Anatoly Bogatyrev	1913	2003	Belarusian	In the Forests of Polesie, Nadezhda Durova	Nationalism
Margaret Bonds	1913	1972	American		
Henry Brant	1913	2008	Canadian-American	Orbits, Verticals Ascending, Angels and Devils	spatial music
Benjamin Britten	1913	1976	English	War Requiem; Sinfonia da Requiem; Peter Grimes; The Young Person's Guide to the Orchestra; Cello Symphony	Neoclassicism, neotonality
Merton Brown	1913	2000	American		
Storm Bull	1913	2007	American		
Matilde Capuis	1913	2017	Italian		
Ronald Center	1913	1973	Scottish		
Peggy Stuart Coolidge	1913	1981	American	Spirituals in Sunshine and Shadow, New England Autumn	folk- and blues-influenced
Gyula Dávid	1913	1977	Hungarian		
Norman Dello Joio	1913	2008	American		
František Domažlický	1913	1997	Czech		
Alvin Etler	1913	1973	American		
Ernest van der Eyken	1913	2010	Belgian	Elegie voor Bieke	
Vivian Fine	1913	2000	American		
Morton Gould	1913	1996	American		
Raymond Hanson	1913	1976	Australian		
Hans Henkemans	1913	1995	Dutch		
Dulcie Holland	1913	2000	Australian		
Miriam Hyde	1913	2005	Australian		
Jørgen Jersild	1913	2004	Danish		
Kent Kennan	1913	2003	American		
Tikhon Khrennikov	1913	2007	Russian		
René Leibowitz	1913	1972	French	Chamber Concerto for 12 instruments	
George Lloyd	1913	1998	English		
Witold Lutosławski	1913	1994	Polish	Concerto for Orchestra; Jeux vénitiens; Musique funebre; Symphony No. 2; Symphony No. 3	Neoclassicism, folk-influenced, later Aleatoric music
Aleksandr Machavariani	1913	1995	Georgian		
Jerome Moross	1913	1983	American		
Maurice Ohana	1913	1992	French		
Willy Ostijn	1913	1993	Belgian		neoclassicism
Gardner Read	1913	2005	American		
Lucio San Pedro	1913	2002	Filipino		
Svend S. Schultz	1913	1998	Danish		
Constantin Silvestri	1913	1969	Romanian		
Raimond Valgre	1913	1949	Estonian		
Valery Zhelobinsky	1913	1946	Russian		
Carl-Olof Anderberg	1914	1972	Swedish	Concerto for viola and orchestra	
Cacilda Borges Barbosa	1914	2010	Brazilian		
Dimitris Dragatakis	1914	2001	Greek		
Cecil Effinger	1914	1990	American	Little Symphony No. 1; Four Pastorales for oboe and chorus	neoclassicism
Irving Fine	1914	1963	American	Partita for wind quintet; Symphony	serial
Roger Goeb	1914	1997	American		
Cor de Groot	1914	1993	Dutch		
Alexei Haieff	1914	1994	American	Piano Concerto; Symphony No. 2	neoclassical, jazz-influenced
Hermann Haller	1914	2002	Swiss		neoclassical
Fumio Hayasaka	1914	1955	Japanese		
Akira Ifukube	1914	2006	Japanese		
Dezider Kardoš	1914	1991	Slovak		folk-influenced
Rafael Kubelík	1914	1996	Czech		
Gail Kubik	1914	1984	American		
Ludwig Lenel	1914	2002	American		
William Lloyd Webber	1914	1982	English		
Riccardo Malipiero	1914	2003	Italian		atonality, twelve-tone technique
Ismail Marzuki	1914	1958	Indonesian		
Wilfrid Mellers	1914	2008	English		
Josef Páleníček	1914	1991	Czech		
Andrzej Panufnik	1914	1991	Polish	10 symphonies	
Teresa Rampazzi	1914	2001	Italian		
Stjepan Sulek	1914	1986	Croatian		
Harold Truscott	1914	1992	English		
Josée Vigneron-Ramackers	1914	2002	Belgian		
Haim Alexander	1915	2012	Israeli		
David Ashkenazi	1915	1997	Russian		
Esther Ballou	1915	1973	American		
Alexander Brott	1915	2005	Canadian		
David Diamond	1915	2005	American	Rounds for string orchestra	neoclassicism
Grigory Frid	1915	2012	Russian	The Diary of Anne Frank	
Alojz Geržinič	1915	2008	Slovenian		
Sembiin Gonchigsumlaa	1915	1991	Mongolian		
Ebbe Grims-land	1915	2015	Swedish		
Júlia Hajdú	1915	1987	Hungarian		
Pamela Harrison	1915	1990	English		
Najla Jabor	1915	2001	Brazilian		
Vítězslava Kaprálová	1915	1940	Czech	Military Sinfonietta, Op. 11; Partita for Piano and Strings, Op. 20	
Eunice Katunda	1915	1991	Brazilian		
Homer Keller	1915	1996	American		
Dorian Le Gallienne	1915	1963	Australian		
Dai-Keong Lee	1915	2005	Chinese-American		
Vic Legley	1915	1994	Belgian		
Douglas Lilburn	1915	2001	New Zealander		
Knut Nystedt	1915	2014	Norwegian		
Robert Moffat Palmer	1915	2010	American		
George Perle	1915	2009	American		
Vincent Persichetti	1915	1987	American		neoclassicism
Dimitar Sagaev	1915	2003	Bulgarian		
Gösta Schwarck	1915	2012	Danish		
John Serry Sr.	1915	2003	American	American Rhapsody; Concerto for Free Bass Accordion	symphonic jazz influenced
Robert Strassburg	1915	2003	American		
Carlos Surinach	1915	1997	Spanish		
Georgy Sviridov	1915	1998	Russian	Piano Sonata	neoromantic
Earl Wild	1915	2010	American		
Joseph R. Wood	1915	2000	American		
Jan Håkan Åberg	1916	2012	Swedish		
Gaston Allaire	1916	2011	Canadian		
Denis ApIvor	1916	2004	British		
Milton Babbitt	1916	2011	American	Composition for Four Instruments; String Quartet No. 2; All Set; Philomel	serialism, electronic music
Philip Bezanson	1916	1975	American		
Karl-Birger Blomdahl	1916	1968	Swedish	Aniara (opera)	Swedish modernism
Valentino Bucchi	1916	1976	Italian		
Mutal Burhonov	1916	2002	Uzbekistani		
Henri Dutilleux	1916	2013	French	Timbres, espace, mouvement; Tout un Monde Lointain; The Shadows of Time	neo-impressionism
Helmut Eder	1916	2005	Austrian		
Merrill Leroy Ellis	1916	1981	American		
Einar Englund	1916	1999	Finnish		
Alberto Ginastera	1916	1983	Argentine	Bomarzo; Cinco canciones populares argentinas; Danzas Argentinas	
Douglas Guest	1916	1996	English		
Luis Herrera de la Fuente	1916	2014	Mexican		
Malcolm MacDonald	1916	1992	British		
Carin Malmlöf-Forssling	1916	2005	Swedish		
Warren Martin	1916	1982	American		
Veli Mukhatov	1916	2005	Turkmenistani		
Nydia Pereyra-Lizaso	1916	1998	Uruguayan		
Nikolay Peyko	1916	1995	Russian		
Jan Rychlík	1916	1964	Czech		
Zikmund Schul	1916	1944	German		
Mordecai Seter	1916	1994	Russian-born Israeli		
Bernard Stevens	1916	1983	British		
Irwin Swack	1916	2006	American		
Erna Tauro	1916	1993	Finnish-Swedish		
Guido Turchi	1916	2010	Italian		
Arnold van Wyk	1916	1983	South African		
Els Aarne	1917	1995	Estonian		
Richard Arnell	1917	2009	English		
Brian Boydell	1917	2000	Irish		
Rudolf Brucci	1917	2002	Italian-Croatian		
Anthony Burgess	1917	1993	English		
Edward T. Cone	1917	2004	American		
Roque Cordero	1917	2008	Panamanian		
Ivor Darreg	1917	1994	American		microtone, xenharmonic
Robert Erickson	1917	1997	American		twelve tone, extended technique
Robert Farnon	1917	2005	Canadian		light music
John Gardner	1917	2011	English	Tomorrow Shall Be My Dancing Day	
Pietro Grossi	1917	2002	Italian		computer music
Egil Harder	1917	1997	Danish		
Lou Harrison	1917	2003	American	Concerto for Violin and Percussion Orchestra; Piano Concerto	
Prenkë Jakova	1917	1969	Albanian		
Hilda Jerea	1917	1980	Romanian		
Václav Kašlík	1917	1989	Czech		
Rena Kyriakou	1917	1994	Greek		
Antonio Lauro	1917	1986	Venezuelan		guitar music
Clarisse Leite	1917	2003	Brazilian		
Emanuel Leplin	1917	1972	American	Symphonies 1, 2 & 3; Violin Concerto; Comedy, Galaxy, Cosmos	
Dinu Lipatti	1917	1950	Romanian		
José Maceda	1917	2004	Filipino		
Jean-Étienne Marie	1917	1989	French		
Oskar Morawetz	1917	2007	Canadian		
Geraldine Mucha	1917	2012	Scottish		
James Penberthy	1917	1999	Australian		
Tarateño Rojas	1917	2001	Bolivian		
Reginald Smith Brindle	1917	2003	British	El Polifemo de Oro for guitar	
Maj Sønstevold	1917	1996	Swedish		
Eta Tyrmand	1917	2008	Belarusian		
Robert Ward	1917	2013	American	Concerto for piano and orchestra	
Richard Yardumian	1917	1985	Armenian-American		
Isang Yun	1917	1995	Korean-German		
Olivier Alain	1918	1994	French		
Louis Applebaum	1918	2000	Canadian		
Jürg Baur	1918	2010	German	Concerto romano for oboe and orchestra; Der Roman mit dem Kontrabass (opera)	serialism, quotation, neoclassicism
Leonard Bernstein	1918	1990	American	West Side Story; Chichester Psalms; Candide; Serenade; Mass	jazz-influenced and pop-influence; also a composer of popular songs, under pseudonym "Lenny Amber"
Lorne Betts	1918	1985	Canadian		
Lina Pires de Campos	1918	2003	Brazilian		
Gayane C'ebotaryan	1918	1998	Armenian		
Liviu Comes	1918	2004	Romanian	choral	
Philip Cranmer	1918	2006	English		
Robert Docker	1918	1992	English		
Gottfried von Einem	1918	1996	Austrian	Dantons Tod, Der Besuch der alten Dame, cantata An die Nachgeborenen	eclectic
Raymond Gallois-Montbrun	1918	1994	French		
Gara Garayev	1918	1982	Azerbaijani		
Harold Gramatges	1918	2008	Cuban		
Lucrecia Roces Kasilag	1918	2008	Filipino		
Marcelo Koc	1918	2006	Argentine	Música para 5 instrumentos; Concerto for Viola and Orchestra	
Lila Lalauni	1918	1996	Greek		
Leonard B. Meyer	1918	2007	American		
Anthony A. Mitchell	1918	2009	American		
Arie Van de Moortel	1918	1976	Belgian		
A. J. Potter	1918	1970	Irish		
Godfrey Ridout	1918	1984	Canadian		
George Rochberg	1918	2005	American		serialism, later Neoromanticism
Denise Tolkowsky	1918	1991	English		
Jórunn Viðar	1918	2017	Icelandic		
Bernd Alois Zimmermann	1918	1970	German	Die Soldaten; Musique pour les soupers du Roi Ubi; Tratto; Tempus loquendi	serialism, musical quotation, collage, electronic music, jazz-influenced, eclectic, polystylism
István Anhalt	1919	2012	Hungarian-Canadian		
Bülent Arel	1919	1990	Turkish		electronic music
Jacob Avshalomov	1919	2013	American		
Sven-Erik Bäck	1919	1994	Swedish		
Bernard Barrell	1919	2005	English		
Niels Viggo Bentzon	1919	2000	Danish		
Karel Berman	1919	1995	Czech		
Roslyn Brogue	1919	1981	American		
Ota Čermák	1919	1963	Czech		
John W. Duarte	1919	2004	British		
Eleonora Eksanishvili	1919	2003	Georgian		
Ludmila Frajt	1919	1999	Serbian		
Udo Kasemets	1919	2014	Estonian-born Canadian		
Leif Kayser	1919	2001	Danish		
Talivaldis Kenins	1919	2008	Latvian-Canadian		
Leon Kirchner	1919	2009	American		
Gideon Klein	1919	1945	Czech		
Li Huanzhi	1919	2000	Chinese		
Václav Nelhýbel	1919	1996	Czech-American		
Juan Orrego-Salas	1919	2019	Chilean		
Jiří Pauer	1919	2007	Czech		
Qu Xixian	1919	2008	Chinese		
Rezső Sugár	1919	1988	Hungarian		
Helen Tobias-Duesberg	1919	2010	Estonian-American		
Akihiro Tsukatani	1919	1995	Japanese		
Galina Ustvolskaya	1919	2006	Russian		
Harold Van Heuvelen	1919	2017	American		
Roman Vlad	1919	2013	Italian		eclectic
Mieczysław Weinberg	1919	1996	Polish	The Passenger and other operas, Violin Concerto	
John Worley	1919	1999	American		
Alexander Arutiunian	1920	2012	Armenian	Trumpet Concerto in A♭ major	avant-garde
Walter Arlen	1920	2023	Austrian-American	songs	
Bebe Barron	1920	1989	American		electronic music
José Antonio Bottiroli	1920	1990	Argentine		
Dave Brubeck	1920	2012	American		
Geoffrey Bush	1920	1998	English		
Henri Crolla	1920	1960	Italian		
Rolande Falcinelli	1920	1996	French		
Dorothea Anne Franchi	1920	2003	New Zealander		
Peter Racine Fricker	1920	1990	English		
Jacob Gilboa	1920	2007	Israeli		
Karen Khachaturian	1920	2011	Soviet and Russian		
Earl Kim	1920	1998	American		
John La Montaine	1920	2013	American		
Kurt Leimer	1920	1974	German		
John Lessard	1920	2003	American		
Aleksandr Lokshin	1920	1987	Russian		
Bruno Maderna	1920	1973	Italian	Satyricon	avant-garde, electronic music
Robert Moevs	1920	2007	American		
Jean Perrin	1920	1989	Swiss		
Marco Rizo	1920	1998	Cuban		
István Sárközy	1920	2002	Hungarian	Júlia énekek, Sinfonia concertante	
Armin Schibler	1920	1986	Swiss		
Harold Shapero	1920	2013	American	Symphony for Classical Orchestra	
Heikki Suolahti	1920	1936	Finnish	Sinfonia piccola	Romanticism
Robert Turner	1920	2012	Canadian		
John Vallier	1920	1991	English		
Zbyněk Vostřák	1920	1985	Czech		
Douglas Allanbrook	1921	2003	American		
Chaya Arbel	1921	2007	Israeli		
Malcolm Arnold	1921	2006	English	Symphony No. 5 and No. 7; English Dances	
Arno Babajanian	1921	1983	Armenian		
Seymour Barab	1921	2014	American		
Jack Beeson	1921	2010	American	Lizzie Borden	
William Bergsma	1921	1994	American	Violin Concerto, March with Trumpets	
Dennis Berry	1921	1994	English		
Marcel Bitsch	1921	2011	French		
Laci Boldemann	1921	1969	Swedish		
Jarmil Burghauser	1921	1997	Czech		
Adrienne Clostre	1921	2006	French		
Jeanne Demessieux	1921	1968	French		
Andrzej Dobrowolski	1921	1990	Polish		
Johannes Driessler	1921	1998	German		
Halim El-Dabh	1921	2017	Egyptian-born American		electronic music
Hans Ulrich Engelmann	1921	2011	German		
Oscar Feltsman	1921	2013	Russian		
Fritz Geißler	1921	1984	German		
Ruth Gipps	1921	1999	British		
Nazife Güran	1921	1993	Turkish		
Antony Hopkins	1921	2014	British		
Karel Husa	1921	2016	Czech-American	Music for Prague 1968; Music for Band, Orchestra, Chamber Ensembles	
Andrew Imbrie	1921	2007	American		neoclassicism
Yoshirō Irino	1921	1980	Japanese		
Kan Ishii	1921	2009	Japanese		
Božidar Kantušer	1921	1999	American/Slovenian		
Joonas Kokkonen	1921	1996	Finnish		
Mustafa Krantja	1921	2002	Albanian		
Robert Kurka	1921	1957	American		
Ingvar Lidholm	1921	2017	Swedish		
Edward Salim Michael	1921	2006	French		
Joseph Hanson Kwabena Nketia	1921	2019	Ghanaian		
Will Ogdon	1921	2013	American		
Astor Piazzolla	1921	1992	Argentine	tangos	
Ariel Ramírez	1921	2010	Argentine	Misa Criolla (1964)	
Primož Ramovš	1921	1999	Slovenian		
Alfred Reed	1921	2005	American		
Ralph Shapey	1921	2002	American		
Robert Simpson	1921	1997	English		
Leo Smit	1921	1999	American		
Vladimír Sommer	1921	1997	Czech		
Jan Tausinger	1921	1980	Czech		
İlhan Usmanbaş	1921	2025	Turkish		
Peter Wishart	1921	1984	English		
Rosalina Abejo	1922	1991	Filipino		
Fikret Amirov	1922	1984	Azerbaijani		
Peter Tranchell	1922	1993	English		
Raffaello de Banfield	1922	2008	English		
Sadao Bekku	1922	2012	Japanese		
Antonio Bibalo	1922	2008	Italian-Norwegian		opera
John Boda	1922	2002	American		
Gérard Calvi	1922	2015	French		
Doreen Carwithen	1922	2003	British		
Alessandro Casagrande	1922	1964	Italian		
Chen Peixun	1922	2007	Chinese		
Đỗ Nhuận	1922	1991	Vietnamese		
Tom Eastwood	1922	1999	English		
Lukas Foss	1922	2009	German-born American	Baroque Variations, Griffelkin	
Wim Franken	1922	2012	Dutch		
German Galynin	1922	1966	Russian	Sonata Triad for piano, First Concerto for Piano and Orchestra, Second Concerto for Piano and Orchestra, Spanish Fantasy for piano	
Odette Gartenlaub	1922	2014	French		
Stefans Grové	1922	2014	South African		
Iain Hamilton	1922	2000	Scottish	chamber & orchestral works; operas & vocal works	
Michael Howard	1922	2002	English		
Ilja Hurník	1922	2013	Czech	sonata da camera for flute, oboe, cello and harpsichord	
David N. Johnson	1922	1987	American		
Kelsey Jones	1922	2004	Canadian		
Leo Kraft	1922	2014	American		
Otmar Mácha	1922	2006	Czech		
Ester Mägi	1922	2021	Estonian		
Tale Ognenovski	1922	2012	Macedonian		
Pierre Petit	1922	2000	French		
Allen Sapp	1922	1999	American		
Kazimierz Serocki	1922	1981	Polish		
Attia Sharara	1922	2014	Egyptian		
Francis Thorne	1922	2017	American		
Leif Thybo	1922	2001	Danish		
Camillo Togni	1922	1993	Italian	Helian di Trakl, Rondeaux per dieci, Blaubart (opera)	
George Walker	1922	2018	American		
Felix Werder	1922	2012	German-born Australian		electronic music
Raymond Wilding-White	1922	2001	English		
James Wilson	1922	2005	Irish		
Iannis Xenakis	1922	2001	Greek	Metastaseis	avant-garde, stochastic music
Zhu Jian'er	1922	2017	Chinese		
Doris Akers	1923	1995	American		
Warren Barker	1923	2006	American		
Leslie Bassett	1923	2016	American		
Jocelyne Binet	1923	1968	Canadian		
Jan Boerman	1923	2020	Dutch		
Teresa Borràs i Fornell	1923	2010	Spanish		
James Clifford Brown	1923	2004	English		
Arthur Butterworth	1923	2014	English		influenced by Sibelius
Jean Catoire	1923	2005	French		
Chou Wen-chung	1923	2019	Chinese/American	Landscapes	
Radim Drejsl	1923	1953	Czech		
Madeleine Dring	1923	1977	English		
Asankhan Dzhumakhmatov	1923	2008	Kyrgyzstani		
Karel Goeyvaerts	1923	1993	Belgian	Sonata for Two Pianos, Nr. 2 for thirteen instruments, Nr. 5 met zuivere tonen, Aquarius (opera)	neoclassicism, serialism, minimalism, postminimalism, mysticism, electronic music
Simeon ten Holt	1923	2012	Dutch	Canto Ostinato	minimalism
Jiří Hudec	1923	1996	Czech		
Jean Eichelberger Ivey	1923	2010	American		
Rune Lindblad	1923	1991	Swedish		
György Ligeti	1923	2006	Hungarian	Atmosphères, Musica ricercata, Lux Aeterna	avant-garde, micropolyphony, polystylism
Ursula Mamlok	1923	2016	German-born, American		
Peter Mennin	1923	1983	American		
Vasilije Mokranjac	1923	1984	Serbian		
Rexho Mulliqi	1923	1982	Albanian		
Daniel Pinkham	1923	2006	American		
Mel Powell	1923	1998	American		
Stefan Remenkov	1923	1988	Bulgarian		
Elena Romero	1923	1996	Spanish		
Ned Rorem	1923	2022	American	Our Town, 3 symphonies	
Triphon Silyanovski	1923	2005	Bulgarian		
Donald Swann	1923	1994	English		
Lester Trimble	1923	1986	American		
Ludmila Ulehla	1923	2009	American		
Gerhard Wimberger	1923	2016	Austrian		
Friedrich Zehm	1923	2007	German		
Claude Abravanel	1924	2012	Swiss		
Leni Alexander	1924	2005	German-Chilean		
Axel Borup-Jørgensen	1924	2012	Danish		
Altamiro Carrilho	1924	2012	Brazilian		
Pierre Cochereau	1924	1984	French		
Jeanne Colin-De Clerck	1924		Belgian		
Ikuma Dan	1924	2001	Japanese	Symphony No. 4 (1965), Sonata for flute and piano (1986)	atonality
Stephen Dodgson	1924	2013	British		
Heimo Erbse	1924	2005	German		
Arthur Frackenpohl	1924	2019	American		
Lejaren Hiller	1924	1994	American	HPSCHD (collaboration with John Cage)	computer music, stochastic music
Stanley Hollingsworth	1924	2003	American		
Egil Hovland	1924	2013	Norwegian		church music
Klaus Huber	1924	2017	Swiss		
Maurice Jarre	1924	2009	French		
Lockrem Johnson	1924	1977	American		
Milko Kelemen	1924	2018	Croatian		
Ezra Laderman	1924	2015	American		
Yehoshua Lakner	1924	2003	Israeli		
Benjamin Lees	1924	2010	American	Concerto for String Quartet and Orchestra	
Riichiro Manabe	1924	2015	Japanese		
Franco Mannino	1924	2005	Italian		
Angela Morley	1924	2009	English		
Krystyna Moszumańska-Nazar	1924	2009	Polish		
Serge Nigg	1924	2008	French		
Luigi Nono	1924	1990	Italian	Il canto sospeso, Intolleranza 1960, Prometeo	avant-garde
Gladys Nordenstrom	1924	2016	American		
Mikhaïl Nossyrev	1924	1981	Russian		Modernist
Julia Perry	1924	1979	American		
Joly Braga Santos	1924	1988	Portuguese		
Ruth Schönthal	1924	2006	German		
Jitka Snížková	1924	1989	Czech		
Robert Starer	1924	2001	Austrian-born American		
Otar Taktakishvili	1924	1989	Georgian		
Ernest Tomlinson	1924	2015	English		
Georgi Tutev	1924	1994	Bulgarian		
Yasushi Akutagawa	1925	1989	Japanese	Rapsodia per orchestra (1971)	atonality
Jurriaan Andriessen	1925	1996	Dutch		
Louis Barron	1925	2008	American		electronic music
Veniamin Basner	1925	1996	Russian		
Robert Beadell	1925	1994	American	The Number of Fools (opera)	jazz-influenced
Gustavo Becerra-Schmidt	1925	2010	Chilean		
Cathy Berberian	1925	1983	Armenian-American	Stripsody	avant-garde
Luciano Berio	1925	2003	Italian	Sequenza; Sinfonia	avant-garde, polystylism
Edith Borroff	1925	2019	American		
André Boucourechliev	1925	1997	French		
Pierre Boulez	1925	2016	French	Le marteau sans maître; …explosante-fixe…; Répons	avant-garde, serialism, aleatory, polystylism
Tristram Cary	1925	2008	English-Australian		
Charles Chaynes	1925	2016	French		
Aldo Clementi	1925	2011	Italian		
Andrei Eshpai	1925	2015	Russian		
Cromwell Everson	1925	1991	South African		
Jindřich Feld	1925	2007	Czech		
Eloy Fominaya	1925	2002	American		
Fernando González Casellas	1925	1998	Argentine		
Aurelio de la Vega	1925	2022	Cuban		
Ron Goodwin	1925	2003	British	New Zealand Suite	best known as a composer of film scores
Clytus Gottwald	1925	2023	German		
Manos Hatzidakis	1925	1994	Greek		
Svatopluk Havelka	1925	2009	Czech		
Bertold Hummel	1925	2002	German		
Ginette Keller	1925	2010	French		
Giselher Klebe	1925	2009	German		
Gerard Kockelmans	1925	1965	Dutch		
Włodzimierz Kotoński	1925	2014	Polish	Concerto per quattro, for piano, harpsichord, guitar, harp, and orchestra	
Frank Lewin	1925	2008	American		
Teo Macero	1925	2008	American	One and Three Quarters	microtonal, jazz-influenced
Kiril Makedonski	1925	1984	Macedonian	five symphonies, two ballets, two symphonic poems, choral music and songs	
Ivo Malec	1925	2019	French	Cantate pour elle; Dodecameron; Lumina	
Kirke Mechem	1925		American	four operas (Tartuffe), two symphonies, choral music	
Miroslav Miletić	1925	2018	Croatian		
Nguyễn Văn Quỳ	1925	2022	Vietnamese		
Julián Orbón	1925	1991	Spanish/Cuban	Three Symphonic Versions	
Michel Philippot	1925	1996	French		
Hans-Hubert Schönzeler	1925	1997	German-born Australian		
Gunther Schuller	1925	2015	American		jazz-influence; Third Stream
Vladimir Shainsky	1925	2017	Russian		
Hale Smith	1925	2009	American		
Claudio Spies	1925	2020	Chilean-American		
Ernie Stires	1925	2008	American		
Boris Tchaikovsky	1925	1996	Russian		
Mikis Theodorakis	1925	2021	Greek	Symphony No. 1-4,7, Sinfonietta Concerto for piano No.1,2, Creatan Concertino; Kata Saddukaion Pathi (Sadducean-Passion)	also composer of popular songs and film scores including Zorba the Greek; Serpico
Sulkhan Tsintsadze	1925	1991	Georgian		
Vladimir Vavilov	1925	1973	Russian		
Paul W. Whear	1925	2021	American	Catharsis Suite for orchestra; Lancaster Overture for orchestra; Catskill Legend for band	
Sergei Agababov	1926	1959	Russian		
Herbert H. Ágústsson	1926	2017	Icelandic		
Garbis Aprikian	1926	2024	Armenian		
Rodolfo Arízaga	1926	1985	Argentine		
John Bevan Baker	1926	1994	British	Suite for Piano; The Seer (opera)	
Edward Bland	1926	2013	American		
Brian Bonsor	1926	2011	Scottish		
Modesta Bor	1926	1998	Venezuelan		
Brian Brockless	1926	1995	English		
Earle Brown	1926	2002	American	December 1952; Available Forms I & II	open form; graphic notation
Louis Calabro	1926	1991	American		
Edwin Carr	1926	2003	New Zealander		
Jacques Castérède	1926	2014	French		
Friedrich Cerha	1926	2023	Austrian	Spiegel	
Janine Charbonnier	1926	2022	French		
Barney Childs	1926	2000	American		extended technique, improvisation, indeterminacy
Eregzengiin Choidog	1926	1988	Mongolian		
Jani Christou	1926	1970	Greek	Mysterion, Praxis for 12	atonality, meta-serialism, improvisation
Francis Dhomont	1926	2023	French		
Manuel Enríquez	1926	1994	Mexican		
Franco Evangelisti	1926	1980	Italian	Incontri di fasce sonore	electronic music
Morton Feldman	1926	1987	American	Rothko Chapel, String Quartet No. 2	
Carlisle Floyd	1926	2021	American	Susannah; Wuthering Heights; Of Mice and Men	
Kenneth Gaburo	1926	1993	American	The Flow of (u)	
Johann Melchior Gletle	1926	1983	Swiss	Vespers in Vienna	
Čestmír Gregor	1926	2011	Czech		
Eric Gross	1926	2011	Austrian-Australian		
Hans Werner Henze	1926	2012	German	Ondine	polystylism
Lee Hoiby	1926	2011	American		
Zhun Huang	1926	2024	Chinese		
Ben Johnston	1926	2019	American	Sonata for Microtonal Piano; String Quartet No. 4 (Variations on "Amazing Grace")	microtonal music
Betsy Jolas	1926		French		
Werner Kaegi	1926	2024	Swiss		electronic music
Melinda Kistétényi	1926	1999	Hungarian		
Gottfried Michael Koenig	1926	2021	German-Dutch	Project 1	computer music, electronic music
Karl Kohn	1926	2024	American		
Oldřich František Korte	1926	2014	Czech	Concerto Grosso	neo-classicism, expressionist, neo-romantic
Meyer Kupferman	1926	2003	American		
György Kurtág	1926		Hungarian	Játékok	
Doming Lam	1926	2023	Chinese		
John Lambert	1926	1995	British		
Celso Garrido Lecca	1926	2025	Peruvian		
Ton de Leeuw	1926	1996	Dutch		
George Martin	1926	2016	English		
Maria de Lourdes Martins	1926	2009	Portuguese		
Janez Matičič	1926	2022	Slovenian		
Hans Otte	1926	2007	German		
Carmen Petra-Basacopol	1926	2023	Romanian		
Claire Polin	1926	1995	American		
Marga Richter	1926	2020	American	Concerto for Piano and Violas, Cellos and Basses	
William Schmidt	1926	2009	American		
William O. Smith	1926	2020	American	Concerto for Jazz Soloist and Orchestra	jazz-influenced; serialism; avant-garde
Kurt-Heinz Stolze	1926	1970	German		
Natela Svanidze	1926	2017	Georgian		
Cornel Trăilescu	1926	2019	Romanian		
David Tudor	1926	1996	American		
Anatol Vieru	1926	1998	Romanian	Concerto for violin, cello and orchestra; seven symphonies; eight string quartets	modality
Robert Wykes	1926	2021	American		
Rolv Yttrehus	1926	2018	American		
Aleksandr Zatsepin	1926		Russian		
Marilyn J. Ziffrin	1926	2018	American		
André Almuró	1927	2009	French		
W. D. Amaradeva	1927	2016	Sri Lankan		
Paul Angerer	1927	2017	Austrian		
John Beckwith	1927	2022	Canadian		
Pascal Bentoiu	1927	2016	Romanian		
Josef Berg	1927	1971	Czech		
Joseph Castaldo	1927	2000	American		
Asger Lund Christiansen	1927	1998	Danish		neoclassicism
Dolores Claman	1927	2021	Canadian		
John Diercks	1927	2020	American		
Emma Lou Diemer	1927	2024	American		
Franco Donatoni	1927	2000	Italian		
John W. Downey	1927	2004	American		
Donald Erb	1927	2008	American	Concerto for Trombone and Orchestra; Concerto for Violin and Orchestra	jazz-influenced, aleatory, electronic music, eclectic
Pierre Henry	1927	2017	French	Symphonie pour un homme seul	musique concrète
Elaine Hugh-Jones	1927	2020	Welsh		
Wilfred Josephs	1927	1997	English		
John Joubert	1927	2019	English		
Wilhelm Killmayer	1927	2017	German	Sinfonia I–III, Song cycles	
Osvaldo Lacerda	1927	2011	Brazilian		
Vlastimil Lejsek	1927	2010	Czech		
Bernhard Lewkovitch	1927	2024	Danish		
Janet Maguire	1927	2019	American		
Richard Maxfield	1927	1969	American		
Ștefan Niculescu	1927	2010	Romanian	Ison II	
Bernard Parmegiani	1927	2013	French		electronic or acousmatic music
Wayne Peterson	1927	2021	American	The Face of the Night, the Heart of the Dark	electro-acoustic, and electronic music
Witold Szalonek	1927	2001	Polish		
William Ennis Thomson	1927	2019	American		
George Balch Wilson	1927	2021	American		
Thomas Wilson	1927	2001	Scottish		
Çesk Zadeja	1927	1997	Albanian		
Margrit Zimmermann	1927	2020	Swiss		
Samuel Adler	1928		American (German-born)		
Luna Alcalay	1928	2012	Austrian		
Ruth Anderson	1928	2019	American		
Tadeusz Baird	1928	1981	Polish		
Jean Barraqué	1928	1973	French	Piano Sonata, Chant après chant	serialism
Lubor Bárta	1928	1972	Czech	Piano Trio in C Major, Concertino for trombone and piano	
Frank Bencriscutto	1928	1997	American	Concerto Grosso for saxophone quartet and band	concert band music
Euel Box	1928	2017	American		
Vitaly Bujanovsky	1928	1993	Russian		
Jean-Michel Damase	1928	2013	French		
George Dreyfus	1928		French		
Jacob Druckman	1928	1996	American	Windows	
Du Mingxin	1928		Chinese		
Judith Dvorkin	1928	1995	American		
David Farquhar	1928	2007	New Zealander	A Unicorn for Christmas, Ring Round the Moon	neoclassicism
Nicolas Flagello	1928	1994	American		Neoclassicism
Valentin Gheorghiu	1928	2023	Romanian		
Otar Gordeli	1928	1994	Georgia		
Beverly Grigsby	1928	2022	American		
Guo Zurong	1928		Chinese		
Bengt Hambraeus	1928	2000	Swedish		
Robert Helps	1928	2001	American		
Frigyes Hidas	1928	2007	Hungarian		
Miloslav Ištvan	1928	1990	Czech		
Karl Korte	1928	2022	American		
Bidzina Kvernadze	1928	2010	Georgian		
Kamilló Lendvay	1928	2016	Hungarian		
Henk van Lijnschooten	1928	2006	Dutch		
Zdeněk Lukáš	1928	2007	Czech		
Ennio Morricone	1928	2020	Italian		also a composer of film music: Once Upon a Time in America; The Mission; The Good, the Bad and the Ugly; A Fistful of Dollars; Once Upon a Time in the West
Diether de la Motte	1928	2010	German	operas, orchestra, chamber	
Thea Musgrave	1928		Scottish		
Jorge Peña Hen	1928	1973	Chilean		
Thomas Rajna	1928	2021	Hungarian		
Einojuhani Rautavaara	1928	2016	Finnish	Cantus Arcticus; Symphony No. 7 "Angel of Light"; Piano Concerto No. 3 "The Gift of Dreams"	
Ronald Stevenson	1928	2015	British		
Karlheinz Stockhausen	1928	2007	German	Kontra-Punkte; Gesang der Jünglinge; Klavierstücke; Gruppen; Kontakte; Hymnen; Stimmung; Mantra; Tierkreis; Inori, first six operas of the Licht cycle	avant-garde, electronic music, serialism, aleatory, intuitive music, formula composition, polystylism
Jay Sydeman	1928	2021	American		
Peter Tahourdin	1928	2009	English-born Australian		
Tommy Tycho	1928	2013	Hungarian-Australian		
Raymond Warren	1928	2025	British		
Nikolla Zoraqi	1928	1991	Albanian		
Harry Bannink	1929	1999	Dutch		
Erling Bjerno	1929	2019	Danish		
Augustyn Bloch	1929	2006	Polish		
Antonio Braga	1929	2009	Italian		
Reiner Bredemeyer	1929	1995	German		
Theo Bruins	1929	1993	Dutch		
Nini Bulterijs	1929	1989	Belgian		
Geghuni Hovannesi Chitchian	1929		Armenian		
Dinos Constantinides	1929	2021	Greek-American	Antigone (opera), Cello Concerto "Shenzhen"	
George Crumb	1929	2022	American	Ancient Voices of Children, Black Angels	extended technique, numerology
Samar Das	1929	2001	Bangladeshi		
Edison Denisov	1929	1996	Russian	L'écume des jours (opera), Requiem, 2 Symphonies, Violin Concerto, Flute Concerto	avant-garde, serialism, extended technique, polystylism, electronic music
Frédéric Devreese	1929	2020	Belgian		
Petr Eben	1929	2007	Czech		
Hormoz Farhat	1929	2021	Iranian		
Luc Ferrari	1929	2005	French	Presque rien No. 1: "Le Lever du jour au bord de la mer"	electronic music
Carlton Gamer	1929	2023	American		
Jerry Goldsmith	1929	2004	American		also composer of film scores, Music for Orchestra; Fireworks
Alun Hoddinott	1929	2008	Welsh		
Pedro Iturralde	1929	2020	Spanish		
Leonard Kastle	1929	2011	American		
Waldemar Kazanecki	1929	1991	Polish		
Charles Knox	1929	2019	American		neo-classical, musical palindromes
Ctirad Kohoutek	1929	2011	Czech		
Boris Kravchenko	1929	1979	Russian		
Kenneth Leighton	1929	1988	English		
Miłosz Magin	1929	1999	Polish		
André Mathieu	1929	1968	Canadian		
Teizo Matsumura	1929	2007	Japanese		atonality
Toshiro Mayuzumi	1929	1997	Japanese		
Robert Muczynski	1929	2010	American		
Ron Nelson	1929	2023	American	Rocky Point Holiday	
Aleksandra Pakhmutova	1929		Russian		
Henri Pousseur	1929	2009	Belgian	Scambi; Votre Faust; Trois visages à Liège; Couleurs croisées	serialism, aleatory, eclectic, polystylism, electronic music, world music, popular music influence,
André Previn	1929	2019	German/American	A Streetcar Named Desire	
Josef Anton Riedl	1929	2016	German		
Bogusław Schaeffer	1929	2019	Polish		
Peter Sculthorpe	1929	2014	Australian	Requiem; Kakadu; Earth Cry; Rites of Passage	
Hans Stadlmair	1929	2019	Austrian	Trumpet Concerto with strings; Saxofonia; Miró	
Siegfried Strohbach	1929	2019	German	5 Galgenlieder; Ein Stern aus Jacob	
James Helme Sutcliffe	1929	2000	American		
Avet Terterian	1929	1994	Armenian		
Lloyd Ultan	1929	1998	American		
James Yannatos	1929	2011	American		
Akio Yashiro	1929	1976	Japanese	piano concerto	atonality
Gerd Zacher	1929	2014	German		
Muhal Richard Abrams	1930	2017	American		
Yardena Alotin	1930	1994	Israeli		
David Amram	1930		American		
Robert Ashley	1930	2014	American	In Memoriam... Kit Carson (opera)	electronic music, extended techniques
Larry Austin	1930	2018	American	Improvisations for Orchestra and Jazz Soloists	electronic music, computer music, jazz-influenced
Petar Bergamo	1930	2022	Croatian		Romanticism, atonality
Claude Bolling	1930	2020	French	Suite for flute and jazz piano trio	jazz-influenced
Jacques Calonne	1930	2022	Belgian		
John Carmichael	1930		Australian		
Robert Cogan	1930	2021	American		
John Davison	1930	1999	American		
Pierre-Max Dubois	1930	1995	French		
Jean Guillou	1930	2019	French		
Friedrich Gulda	1930	2000	Austrian		
Cristóbal Halffter	1930	2021	Spanish	Líneas y puntos; Don Quixote	eclectic, electronic music
Christopher Headington	1930	1996	British		
Ryōhei Hirose	1930	2008	Japanese		
Nikolai Karetnikov	1930	1994	Russian	Symphony No. 3, Concert Piece for piano	
Antoinette Kirkwood	1930	2014	English		
Günter Kochan	1930	2009	German		
Gordon Langford	1930	2017	English	Facets of Glass; Rhapsody for Trombone	brass band music
Theo Loevendie	1930		Dutch		
Lu Yen	1930	2008	Chinese-born Taiwanese		
Gudrun Lund	1930	2020	Danish		
Usko Meriläinen	1930	2004	Finnish		
William P. Perry	1930		American		
Betty Roe	1930		English		
Dieter Schnebel	1930	2018	German	Mahler-Moment; Maulwerke; Baumzucht	
Pieter van der Staak	1930	2007	Dutch		
Tōru Takemitsu	1930	1996	Japanese	A Flock Descends into the Pentagonal Garden; Toward the Sea	neo-impressionism
Eino Tamberg	1930	2010	Estonian		
Veljo Tormis	1930	2017	Estonian		
Nancy Van de Vate	1930	2023	American		
Joan Franks Williams	1930	2003	American		
Robert William Witt	1930	1967	American		neoclassical
Heinz Werner Zimmermann	1930	2022	German		
Louis W. Ballard	1931	2007	American		
Vytautas Barkauskas	1931	2020	Lithuanian		
Martin Boykan	1931	2021	American	Echoes of Petrarch; Piano Trio No. 2; String Quartet No. 3	serialism
Sylvano Bussotti	1931	2021	Italian		
Charles Camilleri	1931	2009	Maltese		
Nancy Laird Chance	1931		American		
F. R. C. Clarke	1931	2009	Canadian		
Lucia Dlugoszewski	1931	2000	American		
Felicia Donceanu	1931	2022	Romanian		
Frederick A. Fox	1931	2011	American		
Robert Gauldin	1931	2025	American		
Lucien Goethals	1931	2006	Belgian		serialism, electronic music
Sofia Gubaidulina	1931	2025	Russian	Offertorium; Music for Flute, Strings, and Percussion	
Donald Harris	1931	2016	American		
Hikaru Hayashi	1931	2012	Japanese	Viola Concerto "Elegia"	
Derek Holman	1931	2019	English		
Josef Maria Horváth	1931	2019	Hungarian		
Mauricio Kagel	1931	2008	Argentine / German	Staatstheater; Kantrimiusik; Ludwig van	polystylism
Rudolf Kelterborn	1931	2021	Swiss		
Krzysztof Komeda	1931	1969	Polish		
Rudolf Komorous	1931		Canadian		
Yüksel Koptagel	1931		Turkish		
André Laporte	1931		Belgian	Das Schloss	eclectic
David Lumsdaine	1931	2024	Australian		
Maria Dolores Malumbres	1931	2019	Spanish		
Myriam Marbe	1931	1997	Romanian		
Donald Martino	1931	2005	American		
Arne Nordheim	1931	2010	Norwegian	Epitaffio; The Tempest (ballet); Magma	many works include electronics
Ib Nørholm	1931	2019	Danish		
Ivo Petrić	1931	2018	Slovenian		
Leon Schidlowsky	1931	2022	Chilean-Israeli		
Makoto Shinohara	1931	2024	Japanese	Fragmente	electronic music, influence of traditional Japanese music
Yuzo Toyama	1931	2023	Japanese		
Peter Westergaard	1931	2019	American		
Malcolm Williamson	1931	2003	Australian	Mass of Christ the King; The Dawn is at Hand; 7 numbered symphonies; cassations	
Elaine Barkin	1932	2023	American		
François Bayle	1932		French		
Niccolò Castiglioni	1932	1996	Italian		
Henning Christiansen	1932	2008	Danish		fluxus
Jean-Michel Defaye	1932	2025	French	trombone music	
Rudi Martinus van Dijk	1932	2003	Dutch		
Tod Dockstader	1932	2008	American		electronic music
James Douglas	1932	2022	Scottish		
Alexander Goehr	1932	2024	English	Arden Must Die, Behold the Sun, Arianna	twelve-tone, later modal, eclectic
Pelle Gudmundsen-Holmgreen	1932	2016	Danish		
André Hajdu	1932	2016	Israeli		
Baligh Hamdi	1932	1993	Egyptian		
Diana Pereira Hay	1932		Danish		
Hans G. Helms	1932	2012	German		
Marta Jiráčková	1932		Czech		
Wojciech Kilar	1932	2013	Polish	Krzesany	holy minimalism; also composer of film music: Dracula (film music)
Marek Kopelent	1932	2023	Czech	chamber music, oratorios	
Bronius Kutavičius	1932	2021	Lithuanian		
Henri Lazarof	1932	2013	Bulgarian		
Martin Mailman	1932	2000	American		
Tera de Marez Oyens	1932	1996	Dutch		
Richard Meale	1932	2009	Australian	Voss	avant-garde
Per Nørgård	1932	2025	Danish	Voyage into the Golden Screen	
Coleridge-Taylor Perkinson	1932	2004	American		
Malcolm Peyton	1932	2025	American		
Gundaris Pone	1932	1994	Latvian-American		
Max Schubel	1932	2010	American		
Christfried Schmidt	1932	2025	German	St. Mark Passion, Oboe Concerto	
Kilza Setti	1932		Brazilian		
Rodion Shchedrin	1932	2025	Russian	Lolita; 2 symphonies; Carmen Suite; 6 piano concertos	polystylism
Sergei Slonimsky	1932	2020	Russian		polystylism
Claude T. Smith	1932	1987	American		
Gitta Steiner	1932	1990	American		
Muammer Sun	1932	2021	Turkish		
Gilles Tremblay	1932	2017	Canadian	Sonorisation du Pavillon du Québec; Fleuves	electronic music, serialism
John Williams	1932		American	also composer of film scores, The Five Sacred Trees	
Hugh Wood	1932	2021	English	Symphony; Cello Concerto; Piano Concerto; Violin Concerto No. 1; Scenes from Comus	symphonic serialism
Leonardo Balada	1933		Spanish-American	6 symphonies; 6 operas	Avant-garde, later folk-influenced
Easley Blackwood	1933	2023	American		polyrhythm, microtone
Seoirse Bodley	1933	2023	Irish		
Michael Brimer	1933	2023	Australian		
Colin Brumby	1933	2018	Australian		
Walter Buczynski	1933		Canadian		
Justin Connolly	1933	2020	British		modernism
Ramiro Cortes	1933	1984	American		serialism, atonality
Pozzi Escot	1933		American		
Antón García Abril	1933	2021	Spanish		
Henryk Górecki	1933	2010	Polish	Symphony of Sorrowful Songs	holy minimalism
Don Kay	1933		Australian		
Ilkka Kuusisto	1933	2025	Finnish	operas	
István Láng	1933	2023	Hungarian		
Bo Linde	1933	1970	Swedish		Neoromanticism
Altaf Mahmud	1933	1971	Bangladeshi		
W. Francis McBeth	1933	2012	American		
Arne Mellnäs	1933	2002	Swedish		
Akira Miyoshi	1933	2013	Japanese		
Harrison Oxley	1933	2009	British		
Krzysztof Penderecki	1933	2020	Polish	Threnody for the Victims of Hiroshima; St. Luke Passion; Polish Requiem; Symphony No. 2: Christmas	avant-garde, extended technique, later neoromanticism, polystylism
Yves Prin	1933		French		neo-impressionism
Eric Salzman	1933	2017	American		avant-garde, atonal, electronic, new music theater
John Sanders	1933	2003	English		
George Tibbits	1933	2008	Australian		
Tôn-Thất Tiết	1933		Vietnamese-French		
Roland Trogan	1933	2012	American		
Bertram Turetzky	1933		American		
Xin Huguang	1933	2011	Chinese	Gada Meilin	
Pierre Ancelin	1934	2001	French		
Alain Bancquart	1934	2022	French		
İlhan Baran	1934	2016	Turkish		
Harrison Birtwistle	1934	2022	English	The Mask of Orpheus (opera), Silbury Air	
Rob du Bois	1934	2013	Dutch	Pastorale VII; Concerto for Two Violins and Orchestra	serialism, improvisation, musical quotation
Benjamin Boretz	1934		American		
Jeremy Dale Roberts	1934	2017	English	I heard a Voice; Cello Concerto – Deathwatch; Croquis; Capriccio	
Mario Davidovsky	1934	2019	American		
Peter Maxwell Davies	1934	2016	English	Taverner, Eight Songs for a Mad King, Symphony No. 1, Symphony No. 3, Symphony No. 6, Strathclyde Concertos, Naxos Quartets	
Peter Dickinson	1934	2023	English		
Anthony Gilbert	1934	2023	British		
Vinko Globokar	1934		French		
Geoffrey Grey	1934	2023	British		
Gustav Gunsenheimer	1934	2026	German	Die Versuchung Jesu	
Alemdar Karamanov	1934	2007	Ukrainian		
Bryan Kelly	1934	2026	English	Service in C (1965)	
Jan Klusak	1934		Czech		polystylism
Nicole Lachartre	1934	1991	French		
William Mathias	1934	1992	Welsh	Let the people praise Thee, O God	
Siegfried Matthus	1934	2021	German	Judith, Te Deum	
Zhanneta Metallidi	1934	2019	Russian		
Gonzalo de Olavide	1934	2005	Spanish		
Paul Panhuysen	1934	2015	Dutch		
Raymond Premru	1934	1998	American		
Bernard Rands	1934	2026	English		
Roger Reynolds	1934		American		
Alan Ridout	1934	1996	British		
Alfred Schnittke	1934	1998	Russian	10 symphonies, notably the First Symphony (1969–1972), the Third (1981), Fourth (1984), and Fifth (1988) Symphonies; Concerto for Piano and String Orchestra (1979	polystylism
Ramon Sender	1934		Spanish		electronic music
Avo Sõmer	1934	2024	American		
Walter Steffens	1934		German		
James Tenney	1934	2006	American		
Alicia Terzian	1934		Armenian-Argentine		
Fisher Tull	1934	1994	American		
Bernard Vitet	1934	2013	French		
Richard Wernick	1934	2025	American		
Christian Wolff	1934		American	Summer, for string quartet; Pebbles, for violin and piano	indeterminacy
Arlene Zallman	1934	2006	American		
Tomislav Zografski	1934	2000	Macedonian	Passacalia; Skherzo; Sonata for Two Pianos; In praise of Ciryl and Methodius	
Vasif Adigozalov	1935	2006	Azerbaijani		
Luis Advis	1935	2004	Chilean		
Theodore Antoniou	1935	2018	Greek		
Ayo Bankole	1935	1976	Nigerian		
Jiří Bárta	1935	2012	Czech	Concerto for Orchestra	
Derek Bell	1935	2002	Irish		
Nigel Butterley	1935	2022	Australian		
Chen Gang	1935		Chinese	Butterfly Lovers' Violin Concerto (collaboration with He Zhanhao)	
John Eaton	1935	2015	American		microtonal music
Biancamaria Furgeri	1935		Italian		
Helen Gifford	1935		Australian		
Kazuko Hara	1935	2014	Japanese		
Elgar Howarth	1935	2025	English		
Teiji Ito	1935	1982	Japanese		
Samuel Jones	1935		American		
Sándor Kalloś	1935		Russian		
Giya Kancheli	1935	2019	Georgian	7 symphonies	holy minimalism
Georg Katzer	1935	2019	German	Baukasten für Orchester; D-Dur Musikmaschine	
Helmut Lachenmann	1935		German	Reigen Seliger Geister; ... zwei Gefühle ...; Das Mädchen mit den Schwefelhölzern	extended technique
François-Bernard Mâche	1935		French		
Pierre Mariétan	1935	2003	Swiss		
Diego Masson	1935		French		
Nicholas Maw	1935	2009	English	Odyssey; The World in the Evening	
Khayyam Mirzazade	1935	2018	Azerbaijani		
Akin Euba	1935	2020	Nigerian		
Jacqueline Nova	1935	1975	Colombian		
Arvo Pärt	1935		Estonian	Tabula Rasa; Fratres; Summa; Cantus In Memoriam Benjamin Britten	holy minimalism, polystylism
Terry Riley	1935		American	In C	minimalism
Aulis Sallinen	1935		Finnish	The King Goes Forth to France	
Peter Schat	1935	2003	Dutch		
Kurt Schwertsik	1935		Austrian		
Noam Sheriff	1935	2018	Israeli		
Donald Sur	1935	1999	American		
Conrad Susa	1935	2013	American		
Gloria Wilson Swisher	1935	2023	American		
André Tchaikowsky	1935	1982	Polish		
Jiří Teml	1935		Czech		
Wang Qiang	1935		Chinese		
Manfred Weiss	1935	2023	German	symphonies, contertos, vocal music	
La Monte Young	1935		American	The Well-Tuned Piano	minimalism, microtonal music, improvisation, Asian-music influence
Mirjana Živković	1935	2020	Serbian		
Gilbert Amy	1936		French		serialism, electronic music, also composer of film music
Izabella Arazova	1936		Armenian	Concerto for Orchestra	
Richard Rodney Bennett	1936	2012	English		
David Blake	1936		British		
Herbert Blendinger	1936	2020	German-Austrian	viola concerto, cantata Mdia in vita, string quartets	also a violist
Harold Budd	1936	2020	American		avant-garde, ambient music
Cornelius Cardew	1936	1981	English	Treatise; The Great Learning	serialism, improvisation, aleatory
Monic Cecconi-Botella	1936	2025	French		
Michel Decoust	1936		French		
Aleksandar Džambazov	1936	2022	Macedonian	Rhapsody for Skopje, Seven dance variations for piano and orchestra	
Iván Erőd	1936	2019	Hungarian-Austrian	opera Seidenraupen, song cycle Milchzahnlieder, piano trios	
Malcolm Forsyth	1936	2011	Canadian		
Erika Fox	1936		British		
Éric Gaudibert	1936	2012	Swiss		
Frans Geysen	1936		Belgian		
Malcolm Goldstein	1936		American		
Daniel Goode	1936		American		
Barbara Heller	1936		German		
Michael Hennagin	1936	1993	American		
Takekuni Hirayoshi	1936	1998	Japanese		
Mogens Winkel Holm	1936	1999	Danish		
Maki Ishii	1936	2003	Japanese		
Oleksandr Krasotov	1936	2007	Ukrainian		
Ladislav Kupkovič	1936	2016	Slovak	Vier Präparierter Texte	Wandelkonzerte, historicism
Young-ja Lee	1931		South Korean		
Gérard Masson	1936		French		
Colin Mawby	1936	2019	English	Laudate Pueri Dominum; Requiem of Hope; The Quest	
Sheila Nelson	1936	2020	English		
Jocy de Oliveira	1936		Brazilian		
Anthony Payne	1936	2021	English		
Erika Radermacher	1936		German		
Steve Reich	1936		American	Piano Phase; Music for 18 Musicians	minimalism; Neoconservative postmodernism
Aribert Reimann	1936	2024	German	Lear; Nahe Ferne; Wolkenloses Christfest	
Vivian Adelberg Rudow	1936		American		
Elliott Schwartz	1936	2016	American	Equinox for orchestra	
Brunhilde Sonntag	1936	2002	German		
Robert Suderburg	1936	2013	American	Concerto, Within the Mirror of Time, for piano and orchestra; Chamber Music VII ("Ceremonies")	
John White	1936	2024	English	Cello and Tuba Machine; 175 piano sonatas	
Hans Zender	1936	2019	German	Stephen Climax (opera)	
Keiko Abe	1937		Japanese		
Edward Applebaum	1937	2020	American		
Rafig Babayev	1937	1994	Azerbaijani		
Jan Bach	1937	2020	American		
Junsang Bahk	1937		South Korean		
Osvaldas Balakauskas	1937	2026	Lithuanian	5 symphonies, Sonata of the Mountains	
Janet Beat	1937		Scottish		
David Bedford	1937	2011	British		
David Behrman	1937		American		
Constança Capdeville	1937	1992	Portuguese		
Azio Corghi	1937	2022	Italian	Divara – Wasser und Blut	
Zbigniew Bargielski	1937		Polish		
Miguel Ángel Coria	1937	2016	Spanish		
David Cornwall	1937	2006	American		
Gordon Crosse	1937	2021	British		
David Del Tredici	1937	2023	American	Child Alice; Final Alice	neoromanticism
Harutiun Dellalian	1937	1990	Armenian		
Eugen Doga	1937	2025	Moldovan	My Sweet and Tender Beast Waltz, Gramophone Waltz	
Anatoly Dokumentov	1937		Russian		
John Ferritto	1937	2010	American		
Misha Geller	1937	2007	Russian	Concerto for Violin, Piano and Orchestra	
Philip Glass	1937		American	Violin Concerto; operas; 8 symphonies	minimalism
Lóránt Hajdú	1937		Hungarian		
Jon Hassell	1937	2021	American		
Walter Hekster	1937	2012	Dutch		
Katherine Hoover	1937	2018	American		
Shamshi Kaldayakov	1937	1992	Kazakhstani		
Nikolai Kapustin	1937	2020	Russian		
Povl Kjøller	1937	1999	Danish		
Marta Lambertini	1937	2019	Argentine		
Philip Ledger	1937	2012	British		
Paul Méfano	1937	2020	French		
Robert Moran	1937		American		
Gösta Neuwirth	1937		Austrian		
Bo Nilsson	1937	2018	Swedish		
Irina Odagescu	1937		Romanian		
John Ogdon	1937	1989	English		
Jean-Louis Petit	1937		French		
Jože Privšek	1937	1998	Slovenian		
Irma Ravinale	1937	2013	Italian		
Rolf Riehm	1937	2026	German	Les Chants de la Revolution sont des Chants de l’Amour	
Edwin Roxburgh	1937		English		
Valentyn Silvestrov	1937		Ukrainian	Symphony No. 5	
Dmitry Smolsky	1937	2017	Belarusian		
Joop Stokkermans	1937	2012	Dutch		
Loris Tjeknavorian	1937		Armenian-Iranian		
Wang Xilin	1937		Chinese		folk-influenced
Olly Wilson	1937	2018	American		
Guy Woolfenden	1937	2016	English		
Yehuda Yannay	1937	2024	American-Israeli	At the End of the Parade; Radiant Inner Light; Piano Concerto	extended techniques, multimedia, postmodern
Maryanne Amacher	1938	2009	American		
Elizabeth R. Austin	1938		American		
Virko Baley	1938		Ukrainian-American		
Bart Berman	1938		Dutch-Israeli		
E. Clement Bethel	1938	1987	Bahamian		
Howard Blake	1938		English		
Jean-Claude Risset	1938	2016	French		
William Bolcom	1938		American	Songs of Experience; Songs of Innocence	
David Borden	1938		American		
Álvaro Cassuto	1938	2026	Portuguese		serialism, neotonality
Paul Chihara	1938		American	Shogun: The Musical	
Gloria Coates	1938	2023	American	Music on Open Strings	
John Corigliano	1938		American	Symphony No. 2; A Dylan Thomas Trilogy	polystylism, also compose of film music: The Red Violin
Alvin Curran	1938		American	For Cornelius; Songs and Views of the Magnetic Garden; Inner Cities	
Jean-Claude Éloy	1938	2025	French		Electroacoustic music
Givi Gachechiladze	1938		Georgian		
Calvin Hampton	1938	1984	American		
John Harbison	1938		American	The Great Gatsby	Neoconservative postmodernism
Paavo Heininen	1938	2022	Finnish		
Hans-Joachim Hespos	1938	2022	German	Seiltanz	avant-garde, extended techniques
Jacques Hétu	1938	2010	Canadian		
Tyzen Hsiao	1938	2015	Taiwanese		
Ashenafi Kebede	1938	1998	Ethiopian	The Shepherd Flutist	
Raja Hossain Khan	1938	1989	Bangladeshi		
Zygmunt Krauze	1938		Polish		
Piotr Lachert	1938	2018	Polish		
Douglas Leedy	1938	2015	American		
Reinbert de Leeuw	1938	2020	Dutch		
Mesías Maiguashca	1938		Ecuadorian	F-Melodies; Ayayayayay	electronic music; spectralism
Barton McLean	1938		American	Rainforest Images (jointly composed with Priscilla McLean)	postmodernist, ambient, drone, minimalist, musique concrète, computer music
Dexter Morrill	1938	2019	American	Crosswalk, Getz Variations, Hudson River Dreams, Iron Horse Concerto, Fantasy Quintet, Ponzo, Roxbury Preludes, Three Lyric Pieces, Stelladagio, Walden Nocturnes	computer music, jazz-influenced, electronic music, improvisation
Michael Parsons	1938		English		
Piera Pistono	1938		Italian		
Simon Preston	1938	2022	English		
Dianne Goolkasian Rahbee	1938		Armenian-American		
Michel Rateau	1938	2020	French		
Frederic Rzewski	1938	2021	American	The People United Will Never Be Defeated!	
Tona Scherchen	1938		Swiss		
José Serebrier	1938		Uruguayan		
Mieko Shiomi	1938		Japanese		
Gregory Short	1938	1999	American		
Christopher Steel	1938	1991	British		
Atli Heimir Sveinsson	1938	2019	Icelandic		
Yuji Takahashi	1938		Japanese		
Cornelia Tăutu	1938	2019	Romanian		
Dimitri Terzakis	1938		Greek		
Joan Tower	1938		American	Petroushskates; Concerto for Orchestra; Sequoia; Fanfare for the Uncommon Woman	
Jan Vriend	1938		Dutch		
Charles Wuorinen	1938	2020	American	Time's Encomium; 8 symphonies; chamber music	twelve-tone technique, serialism
José Antonio Abreu	1939	2018	Venezuelan		
Alojz Ajdič	1939		Slovenian		
Louis Andriessen	1939	2021	Dutch		minimalism
Jon Appleton	1939	2022	American		
Elinor Armer	1939		American		
Charles Boone	1939		American		
Leo Brouwer	1939		Cuban		
Wendy Carlos	1939		American	Switched-On Bach (record album of transcriptions, produced with the use of a Moog synthesizer)	Electronic music (original and transcriptions)
Gian Paolo Chiti	1939		Italian		
Maija Einfelde	1939		Latvian		
Oleg Felzer	1939	1998	Azerbaijani		
Jonathan Harvey	1939	2012	English	Mortuos Plango Vivos Voco; Advaya; Bhakti; Wheel of Emptiness	spectralism
Heinz Holliger	1939		Swiss	Schneewittchen	
Nicolaus A. Huber	1939		German		
Tom Johnson	1939	2024	American	An Hour for Piano	minimalism
Mikheil Kobakhidze	1939	2019	Georgian		
Barbara Kolb	1938	2024	American		
Jaroslav Krček	1939		Czech		
Jean-Pierre Leguay	1939		French		
Arkady Luxemburg	1939		Moldovan-American		
Ma Shui-Long	1939	2015	Taiwanese		
Tigran Mansurian	1939		Armenian		
Bruce Mather	1939		Canadian		
John McCabe	1939	2015	English	Chagall Windows; symphonies; ballets; string quartets	
María Luisa Ozaita	1939	2017	Spanish		
Florencio Pozadas	1939	1968	Bolivian		electroacoustic music
Patric Standford	1939	2014	English	Symphony No.1 "The Seasons"; A Christmas Carol Symphony; Cello Concerto; Christus Requiem	
Tomáš Svoboda	1939	2022	Czech-American	Overture of the Season; Marimba Concerto; "Children's Treasure Box" piano series	
Zsigmond Szathmáry	1939		Hungarian		
Richard Teitelbaum	1939	2020	American		
Boris Tishchenko	1939	2010	Russian		polystylism
Inger Wikström	1939		Swedish		
James Willey	1939		American		
Ellen Taaffe Zwilich	1939		American		neoromanticism
Dieter Acker	1940	2006	German		
Juraj Beneš	1940	2004	Slovak		
Margaret Brouwer	1940		American		
Graciela Castillo	1940		Argentine		electroacoustic
Julius Eastman	1940	1990	American		
Joseph Fennimore	1940		American	Berlitz: Introduction to French; Eventide	eclectic
Henry Flynt	1940		American		
Eleanor Hovda	1940	2009	American		
Alden Jenks	1940		American		
Terry Jennings	1940	1981	American		minimalist
David C. Johnson	1940	2021	American		
Ken-Ichiro Kobayashi	1940		Japanese		
Maria Teresa Luengo	1940		Argentine		
Dorothy Rudd Moore	1940	2022	American		
Gary Lee Nelson	1940		American		
Nguyen-Thien Dao	1940	2015	Vietnamese-French		
Jorge Peixinho	1940	1995	Portuguese		electronic music
Peer Raben	1940	2007	German		
Dan-Alexandru Voiculescu	1940	2009	Romanian		
Alexander Yossifov	1940	2016	Bulgarian		
Frank Zappa	1940	1993	American	Lumpy Gravy; 200 Motels; London Symphony Orchestra , Vol. I; London Symphony Orchestra, Vol. II; The Perfect Stranger; The Yellow Shark	
Stephen Albert	1941	1992	American	Symphony No. 1: Riverrun	
Judith Margaret Bailey	1941	2025	English		
Anđelka Bego-Šimunić	1941	2022	Bosnian		neoclassicism
Konrad Boehmer	1941	2014	Dutch		
Derek Bourgeois	1941	2017	English		
Geoffrey Burgon	1941	2010	British	Magnificat and Nunc Dimittis; Monty Python's Life of Brian (film score)	
David Cope	1941	2025	American		
James Di Pasquale	1941		American		
Francisco Feliciano	1941	2014	Filipino		
Johannes Fritsch	1941	2010	German		
Kay Gardner	1941	2002	American		
Angelo Gilardino	1941	2022	Italian		
Adolphus Hailstork	1941		American		
Sorrel Hays	1941	2020	American		
Moya Henderson	1941		Australian	Lindy	
Valeri Kikta	1941		Ukrainian		
Philip Krumm	1941		American		
Antony le Fleming	1941		English		
Paul Alan Levi	1941		American		
John Melby	1941		American		
Yvar Mikhashoff	1941	1993	American		
John Mitchell	1941		American		
Richard Nanes	1941	2009	American		
Emmanuel Nunes	1941	2012	Portuguese	Machina Mundi; Quodlibet	electronic music
Sook-Ja Oh	1941		Korean		
Magaly Ruiz	1941		Cuban		
Erkki Salmenhaara	1941	2002	Finnish		minimalism
Serge Tcherepnin	1941		American		
Richard Edward Wilson	1941		American		
Birgitte Alsted	1942		Danish		
Philip Bračanin	1942		Australian		
John Cale	1942		Welsh		
John Barnes Chance	1942	1972	American	Elegie; Variations on a Korean Folk Song	
Brian Cherney	1942		Canadian		
Charles Dodge	1942		American	Earth's Magnetic Field	electronic music, computer music
Chinary Ung	1942		Cambodian		
Adel Kamel	1942	2003	Egyptian		
Volker David Kirchner	1942	2020	German	Die Trauung (opera); Missa Moguntina (Mainz Mass); Symphony No. 2 "Mythen"	
Jonathan Kramer	1942	2004	American		postmodernism
Tomás Marco	1942		Spanish	Concierto del agua, for guitar and orchestra; 5 symphonies; String Quartet No. 3 Anatomía fractal de los ángeles; Ojos verdes de luna	avant-garde, neoclassical, folk-influenced, eclectic
Ingram Marshall	1942	2022	American		electronic music; instrumental music
David Matthews	1942		English		
Paul McCartney	1942		English	Liverpool Oratorio; Standing Stone; Ecce Cor Meum	member of The Beatles and Wings
John McGuire	1942		American	Pulse Music III; A Capella	electronic music, fusion of serialism and minimalism, postminimalism
Priscilla McLean	1942		American	Rainforest Images (jointly composed with Barton McLean)	postmodernist, ambient, drone, minimalist, musique concrète, computer music
Haruna Miyake	1942		Japanese		
Meredith Monk	1942		American		
Gentil Montaña	1942	2011	Colombian		
David Padrós	1942	2016	Spanish		
Horațiu Rădulescu	1942	2008	Romanian/French	six string quartets	spectralism
Diogenes Rivas	1942		Venezuelan		
Daniel Roth	1942		French		
Wojciech Rybicki	1942	2019	Polish		
Shigeaki Saegusa	1942		Japanese	Piano Concerto	avant-garde
Kyungsun Suh	1942		Korean		
Viktor Suslin	1942	2012	Russian		
José Antônio Rezende de Almeida Prado	1943	2010	Brazilian		
Solange Ancona	1943	2019	French		
Daniel Börtz	1943		Swedish		
Joanna Bruzdowicz	1943	2021	Polish		
Gavin Bryars	1943		English	Jesus' Blood Never Failed Me Yet, Doctor Ox's Experiment	
Laura Clayton	1943		American		
Eleanor Cory	1943		American		
Edward Cowie	1943		English		
William Duckworth	1943	2012	American		
Hugues Dufourt	1943		French		
Dennis Eberhard	1943	2005	American		
Ross Edwards	1943		Australian		
Margriet Ehlen	1943		Dutch		
Julio Estrada	1943		Mexican		
Brian Ferneyhough	1943		English	Etudes Transcendantales	New Complexity
Faraj Garayev	1943		Azerbaijani		
Rolf Gehlhaar	1943	2019	American	Sub rosa; Five German Dances	electronic music, sound installations
Heinz Karl Gruber	1943		Austrian	Frankenstein!!, Charivari, Aerial	
Robin Holloway	1943		English		
Bill Hopkins	1943	1981	English	En Attendant; Sensation	
Jerry Hunt	1943	1993	American		
Ilaiyaraaja	1943		Indian	How to Name It?; Nothing but wind; Thiruvasagam -An Oratorio; The Music Messiah; India 24 hours;	Indian Classical (Carnatic), Western classical, Fusion, Jazz, Indian folk
Zoltán Jeney	1943	2019	Hungarian		
Alexander Knaifel	1943	2024	Russian	The Canterville Ghost	modernism, polystylism
Morten Lauridsen	1943		American	vocal works	
Tania León	1943		Cuban		
Fred Lerdahl	1943		American		Neoconservative postmodernism
Bruce MacCombie	1943	2012	American		
Bill McGlaughlin	1943		American	Remembering Icarus; Walt Whitman's Dream	
Krzysztof Meyer	1943		Polish	12 string quartets	
Costin Miereanu	1943	2025	French		
Alejandro Núñez Allauca	1943		Peruvian		
Marta Ptaszynska	1943		Polish		
Joseph Schwantner	1943		American	Aftertones of Infinity; A Sudden Rainbow	
Alice Shields	1943		American	The Transformation of Ani, Criseyde, Komachi at Sekidera, White Heron Dance, Zhaojün – The Woman Who Saved the World, Dark Mountain in Spring	electronic and acoustic opera, vocal music, chamber music
Roger Smalley	1943	2015	Australian (born English)	Pulses; 2 piano concertos	serialism, eclectic
Pril Smiley	1943		American		electronic music
Tim Souster	1943	1994	British		
Ivan Tcherepnin	1943	1998	French-American		
Vangelis	1943	2022	Greek		electronic music
Michael Vetter	1943	2013	German	Missa Universalis	new-age, Zen-influenced
Alexander Vustin	1943	2020	Russian	Word	
Udo Zimmermann	1943	2021	German	Weiße Rose, Der Schuhu und die fliegende Prinzessin	opera
William Albright	1944	1998	American		polystylistic
Alison Bauld	1944		Australian		
Gilbert Biberian	1944	2023	Armenian-British		
Willem Breuker	1944	2010	Dutch		
Neely Bruce	1944		American		postminimalist
Tatyana Chudova	1944	2021	Russian		
Barry Conyngham	1944		Australian		
Lyell Cresswell	1944	2022	New Zealander		
Péter Eötvös	1944	2024	Hungarian	Love and Other Demons	eclectic, extended technique, electronic music, folk-music influence
John Fodi	1944	2009	Canadian		
Christopher Gunning	1944	2023	British		
John Hawkins	1944	2007	Canadian		
York Höller	1944		German	Schwarze Halbinseln; Der Meister und Margarita	electronic music, serialism, Gestalt composition
Karl Jenkins	1944		Welsh	The Armed Man; Adiemus; Requiem	
Thomas Koppel	1944	2006	Danish		avant-garde
Beatriz Lockhart	1944	2015	Uruguayan		
Arif Mirzayev	1944		Azerbaijani		
Pehr Henrik Nordgren	1944	2008	Finnish		
Michael Nyman	1944		English	The Man Who Mistook His Wife for a Hat	minimalism
Claire Renard	1944		French		
Goff Richards	1944	2011	English		
Rhian Samuel	1944		Welsh		
Leif Segerstam	1944	2024	Finnish		
John Tavener	1944	2013	English		holy minimalism
László Vidovszky	1944		Hungarian		
Ahmed Achour	1945	2021	Tunisian	Concerto for clarinet and orchestra	
Graciela Agudelo	1945	2018	Mexican		
Charles Amirkhanian	1945		American		
Georges Aperghis	1945		Greek		
Clarence Barlow	1945	2023	Indian-British		
Anthony Braxton	1945		American		
Ole Buck	1945		Danish		
Boudewijn Buckinx	1945		Belgian		
Judith Clingan	1945		Australian		
Rauf Dhomi	1945		Kosovan		
Edward Gregson	1945		English		
Keith Jarrett	1945		American		
Ivan Karabyts	1945	2002	Ukrainian		
Shirish Korde	1945		American		
Fredric Kroll	1945		American		
Chan-Hae Lee	1945		South Korean		
Thomas Oboe Lee	1945		Chinese-American		
Jacques Lenot	1945		French		
Luca Lombardi	1945		Italian		
Younghi Pagh-Paan	1945		South Korean		
Thomas Pasatieri	1945		American		
Russell Peck	1945	2009	American		
Johnterryl Plumeri	1945	2016	American		
Basil Poledouris	1945	2006	American		
Štěpán Rak	1945		Czech		
Doug Riley	1945	2007	Canadian		
John Rutter	1945		English	choral music	
Carol Sams	1945		American	Beauty and the Beast (children's opera)	
İstemihan Taviloğlu	1945	2006	Turkish		
Thomas Wells	1945		American		
Maury Yeston	1945		American	Tom Sawyer: A Ballet in Three Acts, Concerto for Cello and Orchestra, An American Cantata, Sonata for Piano, Trilogues for Three String Quartets	Broadway musicals Nine, Titanic, Grand Hotel Off Broadway Phantom
Judith Lang Zaimont	1945		American		
Zhao Jiping	1945		Chinese		
Barbara Benary	1946	2019	German		
Gilius van Bergeijk	1946		Dutch		
Niels Bernhart	1946	2008	Danish		
Renate Birnstein	1946		German		
Anne Boyd	1946		Australian		
Martin Bresnick	1946		American		
Geneviève Calame	1946	1993	Swiss		
Suzanne Ciani	1946		American		electronic music
Pierre Even (composer)	1946		Luxembourgish		
Michael Finnissy	1946		English		
Zsolt Gárdonyi	1946		Hungarian German	Magnificat, Mozart Changes (organ)	
Janice Giteck	1946		American		
Gérard Grisey	1946	1998	French	Vortex temporum	
Ann-Elise Hannikainen	1946	2012	Finnish		
Ho Wai-On	1946		British		
Tristan Keuris	1946	1996	Dutch		
Ladislav Kubík	1946	2017	Czech-American		
Yasuo Kuwahara	1946	2003	Japanese		
Peter Lieberson	1946	2011	American		
Ulrich Leyendecker	1946	2018	German		
Vladimir Martynov	1946		Russian		minimalism
Colin Matthews	1946		English		
Dimitri Nicolau	1946	2008	Italian		
David Noon	1946		American		
Pierre Pincemaille	1956	2018	French		
Nicola Piovani	1946		Italian		
Kenneth Platts	1946	1989	British		
Robert Xavier Rodriguez	1946		American		
Tolib Shakhidi	1946		Tajik		
Giuseppe Sinopoli	1946	2001	Italian		
Denis Smalley	1946		New Zealander		electroacoustic music, acousmatic music
Richard St. Clair	1946		American	The Lamentations of Shinran; Album of Ragtime Pieces for Piano; Love-Canzonettes for Chorus; Piano Sonatas	Neoromanticism
Pēteris Vasks	1946		Latvian		
Diderik Wagenaar	1946		Dutch		
Dana Wilson	1946		American		
Heinz Winbeck	1946	2019	German		
John Adams	1947		American	Nixon in China; Harmonielehre; Shaker Loops, Short Ride in a Fast Machine; Violin Concerto	post-minimalism
David Ahern	1947	1988	Australian		
Liana Alexandra	1947	2011	Romanian		
Franghiz Ali-Zadeh	1947		Azerbaijani	"Mugam Sayagi". Her works have been performed by Yo-Yo Ma and the Kronos Quartet.	She is best known for her works that combine the musical tradition of the Azerbaijani mugam and 20th-century Western compositional techniques.
Laurie Anderson	1947		American		
Ruth Bakke	1947		Norwegian		
Jean-Yves Bosseur	1947		French		
Alan Bullard	1947		English		
Michel Chion	1947		French		
Anders Eliasson	1947	2013	Swedish	four symphonies	
Jack Gallagher	1947		American		
Donald Grantham	1947		American		
Barry Guy	1947		British		
John S. Hilliard	1947	2019	American	Baron Cimetiere's Mambo	
Ko Fan-long	1947		Taiwanese		
Jo Kondo	1947		Japanese		
Grigoriy Korchmar	1947	2025	Russian		
Nikolai Korndorf	1947	2001	Russian and Canadian		
Zarrina Mirshakar	1947		Tajik		
Tristan Murail	1947		French	Gondwana	spectral music
Paul Patterson	1947		English		
Morris Pert	1947	2010	Scottish		
Karl Aage Rasmussen	1947		Danish		
Václav Riedlbauch	1947	2017	Czech		
Salvatore Sciarrino	1947		Italian		
Howard Skempton	1947		English		
Emil Tabakov	1947		Bulgarian		
Roger Craig Vogel	1947		American		
Gwyneth Van Anden Walker	1947		American		
Zunduin Khangal	1948	1996	Mongolian		
Claude Baker	1948		American		
Josef Bardanashvili	1948		Georgian		
Gisèle Barreau	1948		French		
Michael Berkeley	1948		English		
Chester Biscardi	1948		American		
Glenn Branca	1948	2018	American		avant-garde
Stephen Brown	1948		Canadian		
Diana Burrell	1948		English		
Brian Elias	1948		British		
Brian Eno	1948		English		ambient music, minimalism
Richard Festinger	1948		American		
Jani Golob	1948		Slovenian		
Mikko Heiniö	1948		Finnish		
Bern Herbolsheimer	1948	2016	American	Aria da capo (opera)	
Bo Holten	1948		Danish		
Jean-Michel Jarre	1948		French		
Kerstin Jeppsson	1948		Swedish		
Theo Jörgensmann	1948	2025	German		
Marjan Mozetich	1948		Canadian		
Peter Ruzicka	1948		German		
Allen Shawn	1948		American		
Dmitri Smirnov	1948	2020	Russian / British	Tiriel (opera), Thel (opera)	serialism, collage, electroacoustic music, polystylism, musical cryptography
Jukka Tiensuu	1948		Finnish		
Julia Tsenova	1948	2010	Bulgarian	Sinfonia con piano concertante; Endless Circle for string quintet; Musica Solitudinis; Four songs, to poems by Emily Dickinson	
Claude Vivier	1948	1983	Canadian	Kopernikus: Rituel de la Mort	spectral music, Asian-music influence
Fu Tong Wong	1948		Chinese-American	Symphony: The Hero with Great Eagle	
Eleanor Alberga	1949		Jamaican		
Kalevi Aho	1949		Finnish		
Carlos Azevedo	1949	2012	Portuguese		
Carol E. Barnett	1949		American		
Leonid Bobylev	1949	2025	Russian	Symphony (1985), Concerto for viola and string orchestra (1970)	
Jolyon Brettingham Smith	1949	2008	English		
John Casken	1949		English		
Daniel Catán	1949	2011	Mexican	Florencia en el Amazonas; Rappaccini's Daughter	neo-impressionism
Chan Ka Nin	1949		Canadian		
Daniel Steven Crafts	1949		American		
Rocco Di Pietro	1949		Italian		
Dean Drummond	1949	2013	American		
Tim Hodgkinson	1949		English		
Michel Herr	1949		Belgian		
Michaël Lévinas	1949		French		
Dan Locklair	1949		American		
Fernando Mencherini	1949	1997	Italian		
Theodore Papakonstantinou	1949	1970	Cypriot		
Stephen Paulus	1949	2014	American	Pilgrim's Hymn; The Road Home;	
Geoffrey Poole	1949		English		
Christopher Rouse	1949	2019	American	Karolju; Phantasmata; Trombone Concerto; Symphony No. 1; Symphony No. 2	
Poul Ruders	1949		Danish		
Thomas Schmidt-Kowalski	1949	2013	German		
Dave Smith	1949		English		
Steven Stucky	1949	2016	American	Son et Lumière; Concerto for Orchestra No. 2; Rhapsodies; August 4, 1964	
Vladimir Tošić	1949		Serbian		
Kevin Volans	1949		South African	Hunting Gathering	
Philip Wilby	1949		English		brass-band music
Ernani Aguiar	1950		Brazilian		
Beth Anderson	1950		American		
Robert Black	1950	1993	American		
Gene Bowen	1950		American		
Stephen Chatman	1950		Canadian		
David B. Doty	1950		American		
Elena Firsova	1950		Russian / British	The Nightingale and the Rose	
Olivier Greif	1950	2000	French		
Åse Hedstrøm	1950		Norwegian		
Alistair Hinton	1950		Scottish		
Christopher Hobbs	1950		English		
Otomar Kvěch	1950	2018	Czech		
Emmanuel Gyimah Labi	1950		Ghanaian		
Lam Manyee	1950		Chinese		
Libby Larsen	1950		American	Marimba Concerto	
Elodie Lauten	1950	2014	American		
Arturo Márquez	1950		Mexican	Danzón no. 2	
Joseph Pehrson	1950	2020	American		
Stephen Oliver	1950	1992	English		
Jay Reise	1950		American		
Joe Hisaishi	1950		Japanese		also notable as a film composer
Lepo Sumera	1950	2000	Estonian		electro-acoustic music
William Sweeney	1950		Scottish		folk-influenced
Carl Verbraeken	1950		Belgian		
Rafał Augustyn	1951		Polish		
Alan Belkin	1951		Canadian		
Michael Blake	1951		South African	French Suite	
John Burke	1951	2020	Canadian		
Howard J. Buss	1951		American	Modern Times	
Chen Qigang	1951		Chinese-French		
Anthony Davis	1951		American		
Paul Dresher	1951		American		
Huib Emmer	1951		Dutch		
Richard Emsley	1951		British		
James Erber	1951		British		
Lorenzo Ferrero	1951		Italian	Salvatore Giuliano, La Conquista, Risorgimento!	postmodern
David Froom	1951		American		
Nancy Galbraith	1951		American		postmodern/postminimalist
Francisco Guerrero Marín	1951	1997	Spanish		
Halina Harelava	1951		Belarusian		
Earl Howard	1951		American		avant-garde
Brian Israel	1951	1986	American		
Viera Janárceková	1951		Slovak		
Patricia Jünger	1951		Swiss-Austrian		
Aivars Kalējs	1951		Latvian		Neoromanticism
Patrick Larley	1951		British		
Mona Lyn Reese	1951		American		
Michael Rosenzweig	1951		South African	Symphony in One Movement; String Quartet No. 2	
Doina Rotaru	1951		Romanian	Concerto for clarinet and orchestra; Florilegium, concerto for flute and flutes orchestra; Wings of Light for 24 flutists	
Craig Russell	1951		American		
George Tsontakis	1951		American		
Hans Abrahamsen	1952		Danish		
Sérgio Assad	1952		Brazilian		
Simon Bainbridge	1952	2021	British		
Gerald Barry	1952		Irish		
Max Beckschäfer	1952		German	Michelangelo-Fragmente, vocal music	also academic for music theory
Judith Bingham	1952		British		
Roger Bourland	1952		American		
David Carlson	1952		American		
Mark Carlson	1952		American		
Rhys Chatham	1952		American		avant-garde, minimalism
Maia Ciobanu	1952		Romanian		
Todd Tamanend Clark	1952		American	"Brain and Spinal Column", "The Grim Rider", "Into the Vision"	electronic, psychedelic
Tina Davidson	1952		American		
Richard Einhorn	1952		American	Voices of Light (oratorio); The Origin (opera/oratorio)	
Reinhard Febel	1952		German	opera Sekunden und Jahre des Caspar Hauser, Wolkenstein, Sinfonie	
Heiner Goebbels	1952		German		
Stephen Hartke	1952		American		
Margriet Hoenderdos	1952	2010	Dutch		
Lee Hyla	1952	2014	American		
Scott Johnson	1952		American		
Oliver Knussen	1952	2018	British	Where the Wild Things Are	
Lev Konov	1952		Russian		
Gerd Kühr	1952		German	operas Stallerhof, Tod und Teufel	
Christian Lauba	1952		Tunisian born French	The Lose Forest for ensemble of 12 saxophones, Neuf études pour saxophone	
Irfan Ljubijankić	1952	1995	Bosnian		
Philippe Manoury	1952		French	60th Parallel (opera), Pluton for piano and live electronics	punctualism, computer-assisted composition
Kazuhiro Morita	1952		Japanese		
Dominic Muldowney	1952		English		
Alla Pavlova	1952		Russian		
Qu Xiao-Song	1952		Chinese		
Godfried-Willem Raes	1952		Belgian		
Wolfgang Rihm	1952	2024	German	12 string quartets; Die Eroberung von Mexico (opera)	New Simplicity, expressionism, neoromanticism
Kaija Saariaho	1952	2023	Finnish	L’amour de loin; Adriana Mater; La Passion de Simone Laterna Magica;	
Tatyana Sergeyeva	1952		Russian		
Motoyuki Shitanda	1952		Japanese		
Ryuichi Sakamoto	1952	2023	Japanese		
Peter-Jan Wagemans	1952		Dutch		
Moshe Zorman	1952		Israeli		
John Luther Adams	1953		American	Various pieces inspired by Alaskan landscapes	
Martin Amlin	1953		American		
Avril Anderson	1953		English		
Patrick Ascione	1953	2014	French	Divertissement	Electroacoustic and Acousmatic music
Daniel Asia	1953		American		
Roger Bellon	1953		French		
Josefina Benedetti	1953		American		
Susan Morton Blaustein	1953		American		
Cornelis de Bondt	1953		Dutch		
Hans-Jürgen von Bose	1953		German	Piano music	
Wendy Mae Chambers	1953		American		
Chen Yi	1953		Chinese		
Andrew Culver	1953		American		
Stéphane Delplace	1953		French		
Jody Diamond	1953		American		
Violeta Dinescu	1953		Romanian	Der 35. Mai (children's opera)	
Arnold Dreyblatt	1953		American		
Denis Dufour	1953		French	Cycle Plis de perversion, Bocalises, Messe à l'usage des vieillards, Hérisson Cathédrale	instrumental perceptive morphology, acousmatic music, mixed music, electronic music
Nicolas Economou	1953	1993	Cypriot		
René Eespere	1953		Estonian		
Eibhlis Farrell	1953		Irish		
David Felder	1953		American		
David First	1953		American		
Georg Friedrich Haas	1953		Austrian	Double Concerto for accordion, viola and chamber ensemble, Concerto for violin and orchestra	spectral music
He Xuntian	1953		Chinese		
Adriana Hölszky	1953		Romanian-German		
Juhani Komulainen	1953		Finnish		
Peter Scott Lewis	1953		American		
Tod Machover	1953		American		
Jeff Manookian	1953	2021	American		
Wim Mertens	1953		Belgian	The Belly of an Architect (incl. Struggle for Pleasure), Maximizing the Audience	minimalism
Akira Nishimura	1953		Japanese		
Anthony Powers	1953		British		
Alexander Raskatov	1953		Russian		
Roberto Sierra	1953		Puerto Rican	Missa Latina	
Vladimir Soltan	1953	1997	Belarusian		
Z. Randall Stroope	1953		American	"Inscription of Hope", "The Pasture", "Homeland"	
James Wood	1953		English	Stoicheia, Ho shang Yao	microtonality, percussion, voice
Takashi Yoshimatsu	1953		Japanese	Symphony No. 2	
Zhou Long	1953		Chinese		
Lidia Zielińska	1953		Polish		
John Zorn	1953		American		Avant-garde
Richard Blackford	1954		English		
Sylvie Bodorová	1954		Czech		
Elisabetta Brusa	1954		Italian		
Robert Carl	1954		American		
Chan Wing-wah	1954		Chinese		
Nicolas Collins	1954		American		electronic music
Michael Daugherty	1954		American	UFO	
Paul Dirmeikis	1954		American	Message laisse à Pondichéry le 18 novembre 1973	eclectic
Joël-François Durand	1954		French	Piano Concerto	
María Escribano	1954	2002	Spanish		
Eric Ewazen	1954		American		
Susan Frykberg	1954		New Zealander		electroacoustic
Ge Gan-ru	1954		Chinese		
Elliot Goldenthal	1954		American		
Robert Greenberg	1954		American		
Irina Hasnaș	1954		Romanian		
Birgit Havenstein	1954		German		
Anders Hillborg	1954		Swedish		
Vladimír Hirsch	1954		Czech		avant-garde
Brenda Hutchinson	1954		American		
Stephen Jaffe	1954		American		
Denise Kelly	1954		Irish		
Eric Moe	1954		American		
John Musto	1954		American		
Șerban Nichifor	1954		Romanian		
Betty Olivero	1954		Israeli		
Cecilie Ore	1954		Norwegian		
Tobias Picker	1954		American		
Arturo Rodas	1954		Franco-Ecuadorian	Arcaica, a concerto for percussion & orchestra; 24.5 Preludes for piano; El arbol de los pájaros (The birds tree): opera "for the voice of the instruments"	avant-garde, polystylism
Jan Sandström	1954		Swedish	Motorbike Concerto, Es ist ein Ros entsprungen, Rekviem	
Paweł Szymański	1954		Polish		
Carl Vine	1954		Australian		
Judith Weir	1954		British		
René Wohlhauser	1954		Swiss		
Bob Chilcott	1955		British	Choral music	
David Conte	1955		American		
Pascal Dusapin	1955		French	Perelà, uomo di fumo	
Roland Dyens	1955	2016	Tunisian-French		
Mark Edgley Smith	1955	2008	English		
Ludovico Einaudi	1955		Italian		minimalism
Juraj Filas	1955		Slovak		
Diamanda Galás	1955		American		
Kyle Gann	1955		American		Just intonation
Naji Hakim	1955		Lebanese-French		
Toshio Hosokawa	1955		Japanese	Vision of Lear, Circulating Ocean, Voiceless Voice in Hiroshima	neo-impressionism
David A. Jaffe	1955		American	"Silicon Valley Breakdown"; "The Seven Wonders of the Ancient World"	computer music, folk-music-influenced
Olli Kortekangas	1955		Finnish		
Bernardo Kuczer	1955		Argentinian	Civilización o Barbarie	Electronic music
Carter Larsen	1955		American		concertos, music for theater and film
Jukka Linkola	1955		Finnish		
Pedro Luís Neves	1955		Portuguese		
Michael Obst	1955		German	Solaris	electronic music
Gérard Pape	1955		American		electronic music
Bright Sheng	1955		Chinese	The Silver River	Folk-influenced
Tibor Szemző	1955		Hungarian		
Krassimir Taskov	1955		Bulgarian		
Ian Venables	1955		English	Songs of Eternity and Sorrow, Remember This	
Ye Xiaogang	1955		Chinese		
Eduardo Alonso-Crespo	1956		Argentine		
Javier Álvarez	1956	2023	Mexican	Metro Chabacano, Temazcal	
Regina Harris Baiocchi	1956		American		
Sally Beamish	1956		British		
Chiara Benati	1956		Italian		
Tim Brady	1956		Canadian		
Benet Casablancas	1956		Spanish	Seven Scenes from Hamlet, New Epigrams, Alter Klang, Seven Haikus for sextet, L'enigma di Lea (opera)	Expressionism, Avant-garde, neo-impressionism
Richard Danielpour	1956		American	Margaret Garner	
Daniel Dorff	1956		American		
Anne Dudley	1956		English		
Dror Elimelech	1956		Israeli		
Michelle Ekizian	1956		American		
Miguel Frasconi	1956		American		
Kenneth Fuchs	1956		American	Falling Man (for baritone voice and orchestra, text by Don DeLillo, adapted by J. D. McClatchy)	American Symphonic School
Vladimír Godár	1956		Slovak		
Michael Gordon	1956		American		
Philip Grange	1956		English		
Guo Wenjing	1956		Chinese		Opera
Madeleine Isaksson	1956		Swedish		
Jouni Kaipainen	1956	2015	Finnish		
Makiko Kinoshita	1956		Japanese		
Graeme Koehne	1956		Australian	Inflight Entertainment (oboe concerto); Tivoli Dances	
Leon Milo	1956	2014	American	TimeTexture for piano and electronics	electroacoustic music
Thomas Pernes	1956	2018	Austrian		avant-garde
Paul Phillips	1956		American		
Iris ter Schiphorst	1956		German		
Oliver Schroer	1956	2008	Canadian		
Stefano Scodanibbio	1956	2012	Italian		
Laurence Traiger	1956		American		
Miguel del Águila	1957		Uruguayan-American	Concierto en Tango, Conga, Salon Buenos Aires, Violin Concerto, Wind Quintet No. 2	
Masamichi Amano	1957		Japanese		
Gheorghi Arnaoudov	1957		Bulgarian		minimalism
Charles Roland Berry	1957		American		
Linda Bouchard	1957		Canadian		
Mary Ellen Childs	1957		American		
James Clarke	1957		English		
Chaya Czernowin	1957		Israeli		
Alexandre Danilevsky	1957		Russian-born French		
Don Davis	1957		American	Río de Sangre	also composer of film music: The Matrix
Andrew Ford	1957		English-born Australian		
Ellen Fullman	1957		American		
Jiří Gemrot	1957		Czech		
Guan Xia	1957		Chinese	Symphonic Overture No. 1	
Regina Irman	1957		Swiss		
Ivo Josipović	1957		Croatian		
Elena Kats-Chernin	1957		Australian		
Camille Kerger	1957		Luxembourg		
Kim Jin-hi	1957		South Korean		
David Lang	1957		American	The Little Match Girl Passion	
Jorge Liderman	1957	2008	American		
Paul Moravec	1957		American	Spiritdance; Chamber Symphony; Tempest Fantasy; The Time Gallery	
Zurab Nadareishvili	1957		Georgian		
Pan Shiji	1957		Taiwanese	String Quartet no. 4	
Gerhard Präsent	1957		Austrian	Himmelslicht; Missa minima; Trio intricato	
Gerhard Schedl	1957	2000	Austrian	Slow, Cello Concerto	
Petros Shoujounian	1957		Armenian-Canadian		
Cong Su	1957		Chinese		
Tan Dun	1957		Chinese	Water Passion after St. Matthew	Extended technique, Folk-influenced; also composer of film music: Crouching Tiger, Hidden Dragon
Michael Glenn Williams	1957		American		
Falko Steinbach	1957		German		
Patrick Hawes	1958		English	Highgrove Suite; Quanta Qualia; The Land; The Wedding at Cana	
Eve Beglarian	1958		Armenian-American		
Karl Gottfried Brunotte	1958		German		
Giulio Castagnoli	1958		Italian	Concerto for Cello and Double Orchestra; Concerto for Piano and Orchestra; Missa Sancti Evasii	
Oscar van Dillen	1958		Dutch		
Paul Elwood	1958		American		
Suzanne Giraud	1958		French		
Juliana Hall	1958		American		
Hanna Havrylets	1958	2022	Ukrainian		
Richard Kastle	1958		American		Neoclassical
Mark Kilstofte	1958		American		
Christian Lindberg	1958		Swedish	Arabenne, Mandrake in the Corner	
Magnus Lindberg	1958		Finnish	Kraft; Clarinet Concerto	
Mladen Milicevic	1958		Bosnian/American	cl? – for prepared clarinet and electronics (1985)	experimental music, sound installation, and film music
Jun Miyake	1958		Japanese		
Mo Wuping	1958	1993	Chinese		
Esa-Pekka Salonen	1958		Finnish	LA Variations; Insomnia	
Thomas Simaku	1958		Albanian		
Bent Sørensen	1958		Danish		
Rafał Stradomski	1958		Polish		
Nigel Westlake	1958		Australian		
Julia Wolfe	1958		American		
Sinta Wullur	1958		Indonesian-Dutch		
Akio Yasuraoka	1958		Japanese		
Jay Alan Yim	1958		American		
Andrew York	1958		American		
Hiroaki Zakōji	1958	1987	Japanese		
Davide Zannoni	1958		Italian		
Caroline Ansink	1959		Dutch		
Richard Barrett	1959		Welsh	Construction	electroacoustic music, improvisation
Kendall Durelle Briggs	1959		American		
Sebastian Currier	1959		American		
Paul Doornbusch	1959		Australian		computer music, electroacoustic music
Alfio Fazio	1959		Italian		
Vladimír Franz	1959		Czech		
Lucio Garau	1959		Italian		
James Harley	1959		Canadian		
Adina Izarra	1959		Venezuelan		
Vakhtang Kakhidze	1959		Georgian		
Shigeru Kan-no	1959		Japanese	Play Station Cycles; Simulation Cycles	
Ana Lara	1959		Mexican		
James MacMillan	1959		Scottish	The Sacrifice; Veni veni Emmanuel (percussion concerto); The Confession of Isobel Gowdie; St. John Passion; 3 symphonies	
Steve Martland	1959	2013	English		
John Palmer	1959		British		
Victor Rasgado	1959	2023	Mexican		
Erkki-Sven Tüür	1959		Estonian	6 symphonies; Violin Concerto; Piano Concerto; Searching for Roots	
Nobuo Uematsu	1959		Japanese	Liberi Fatali	
Robert Ian Winstin	1959	2010	American		
Maria de Alvear	1960		Spanish-German		
Miguel Álvarez-Fernández	1979		Spanish	Auto Sacramental Invisible; Voyelles	electronic music; sound installation; radio art
Dirk Brossé	1960		Belgian		
George Benjamin	1960		English	Sudden Time; Antara	
Nigel Clarke	1960		English	Samurai; A Richer Dust (Symphony No 1.); The Miraculous Violin; Mysteries of the Horizon (Trumpet/Cornet Concerto); Earthrise; Gagarin	
Sidney Corbett	1960		American		
Nathan Currier	1960		American	Gaian Variations	
Karlheinz Essl, Jr.	1960		Austrian	Lexikon-Sonate	electroacoustic and instrumental music
Detlev Glanert	1960		German	operas Leyla und Medjnun, Caligula, Solaris	
Osvaldo Golijov	1960		Argentine		
Annie Gosfield	1960		American		
Julian Grant	1960		English		
Georg Hajdu	1960		German		
Pertti Jalava	1960		Finnish	Music for orchestra (including five symphonies), chamber ensembles, big band, jazz ensembles, wind band and choir	
Aaron Jay Kernis	1960		American	Musica Instrumentalis, Colored Field	
Priti Paintal	1960		Indian		
Alexander Shchetynsky	1960		Ukrainian		
William Susman	1960		American	Marimba Montuño (solo); Camille (chamber ensmeble); Trailing Vortices (chamber orchestra); Fate of the Lhapa (film score)	postminimalism; also composer of film music: Native New Yorker
Mark-Anthony Turnage	1960		English	Greek; From All Sides; Mambo, Blue and Tarantella (violin concerto); From the Wreckage (trumpet concerto); Fractured Lines (percussion concerto); Five Views of a Mouth (flute concerto); A Fast Stomp	
Ezequiel Viñao	1960		Argentine-American	Piano Etudes; The Loss and the Silence; Vivian of Avalon; Saga; The Wanderer; Sirocco Dust	
Ana-Maria Avram	1961	2017	Romanian		spectral music
John Burge	1961		Canadian		
Unsuk Chin	1961		South Korean	Alice in Wonderland; Violin Concerto; Fantasie mécanique; Cantatrix Sopranica	
Marc-André Dalbavie	1961		French		
Nailia Galiamova	1961		Uzbekistani		
Lucio Gregoretti	1961		Italian		
Jorge Grundman	1961		Spanish		
Daron Hagen	1961		American		
Jake Heggie	1961		American	Dead Man Walking	
Hanna Kulenty	1961		Polish	Ad Unum, Breathe, The Mother of Black Winged-Dreams, Trumpet Concerto, String Quartet No. 4	
Lowell Liebermann	1961		American		
Peter Machajdík	1961		Slovak / German	Namah; Double Bayan Concerto; Farewell Fanfares; Lasea; Nell'autunno del suo abbraccio insonne	postminimalism, electronic music
Alo Mattiisen	1961	1996	Estonian		
Erica Muhl	1961		American	Consolation	
Michiru Ōshima	1961		Japanese		
Michael Torke	1961		American	"Vanada"; Javelin; Rapture (percussion concerto); Ecstatic Orange	
Raymond Torres-Santos	1958		Puerto Rican		
Roman Turovsky-Savchuk	1961		Ukrainian/American	Tombeau for Omelyan Kovch	historicist–neo-Baroque
Peter Zagar	1961		Slovak		
Mohamed Abdelwahab Abdelfattah	1962		Egypt	Die Wunderzahl, String Quartet No. 2 "Monamnamat"	electroacoustic, postmodernism
Michael Abels	1962		American	Global Warming	
Sylvia Constantinidis	1962		Venezuelan-American		
Arne Eigenfeldt	1962		Canadian		
Carl Faia	1962		American		
Stefano Gervasoni	1962		Italian		
Jack Gibbons	1962		English	Ave Verum Corpus, Choral works, Serenade for string orchestra, Song cycles, Piano works	
Jennifer Higdon	1962		American		
Craig Hella Johnson	1962		American	Numerous choral compositions and arrangements	
Claus-Steffen Mahnkopf	1962		German		
P. Q. Phan	1962		Vietnamese		
Surendran Reddy	1962	2010	South African		
Rudi Spring	1962	2025	German	Heimkunft, chamber symphonies, song cycles	
Kaoru Wada	1962		Japanese		
Graham Waterhouse	1962		English	Piccolo Quintet, Three Pieces for Solo Cello, Gestural Variations	
Sandeep Bhagwati	1963		Indian	opera Ramanujan	
Michel Bosc	1963		French		
Philip Cashian	1963		British		
Graham Fitkin	1963		British		
Michael Zev Gordon	1963		British		
Svante Henryson	1963		Swedish		
Sophie Lacaze	1963		French		
Shinkichi Mitsumune	1963		Japanese		
Hikari Ōe	1963		Japanese		
John Pickard	1963		British		
Fausto Romitelli	1963	2004	Italian		
Calliope Tsoupaki	1963		Greek		
Hana Vejvodová	1963	1994	Czech	Brass Quintet	
Edson Zampronha	1963		Brazilian	Lamenti, Recycling Collaging Sampling, Concert for Piano N.1, Modelagem X-a	
Luca Belcastro	1964		Italian		
Marco Betta	1964		Italian		
Scott Boerma	1964		American		
Boris Böhmann	1964		German		
Gregers Brinch	1964		Danish		
Jörgen Dafgård	1964		Swedish	For the Sleeping – Dream Sonata	
Judy Dunaway	1964		American		avant-garde
Julia Gomelskaya	1964	2016	Ukrainian		
Fiona Joy Hawkins	1964		Australian		
Jun Nagao	1964		Japanese		
Javier Parrado	1964		Bolivian		
Cristian Pațurcă	1964	2011	Romanian		
Richard Rijnvos	1964		Dutch	Block Beuys	
Anton Batagov	1965		Russian		post-minimalist
Irina Bogushevskaya	1965		Russian		
Carin Bartosch Edström	1965		Swedish		
Moritz Eggert	1965		German		
Thierry Escaich	1965		French		
Yuri Khanon	1965		Russian	The Shagreen Bone, The Symphony of Dogs, The Middle Symphony, Agonia Dei, What Zarathustra Said Indeed	polystylism, neoclassicism
Gordon McPherson	1965		Scottish		
Peter Nardone	1965		Scottish		
Bernd Redmann	1965		German	opera Die Gehetzten, orchestra Fiasko, chamber Migrant	
Georgia Spiropoulos	1965		Greek	Klama, for mixed choir & live electronics	avant-garde
Paul Steenhuisen	1965		Canadian		
Mats Wendt	1965		Eddan – The Invincible Sword of the Elf-Smith		
Roberto Carnevale	1966		Italian	Linae (1992–1995)	
Nicholas Frances Chase	1966		American		
Juan J. Colomer	1966		Spanish	La complicidad del espectro	
Dorothy Hindman	1966		American	drowningXnumbers, Magic City for orchestra	
Jan Müller-Wieland	1966		German	operas Gastspiel, Komödie ohne Titel, Das Märchen der 672. Nacht	
John Psathas	1966		New Zealand		
Juan María Solare	1966		Argentine		
Donald Reid Womack	1966		American		
Julian Anderson	1967		British		
Mark Applebaum	1967		American		
Derek Bermel	1967		American		
Sansan Chien	1967	2011	Chinese		
Salvatore Di Vittorio	1967		Italian		
Amos Elkana	1967		Israeli		
Jens Josef	1967		German	Musik für Flöte(n), Viola und Kontrabass, chamber music	
Andreas Kunstein	1967		Dutch		
Olli Mustonen	1967		Finnish		
Alberto Posadas	1967		Spanish		
Eric Qin	1967	1993	American		experimental music
Christopher Theofanidis	1967		American		
Xu Yi	1967		Chinese		
Jun Yamaguchi	1967		Japanese		
Hiroyuki Yamamoto	1967		Japanese		
Laura Andel	1968		Argentine		
Joe Cutler	1968		British		
Jens Joneleit	1968		German	operas Der Brand, Piero &‐ Ende der Nacht, Metanoia. Über das Denken hinaus	
Johannes Kretz	1968		Austrian		
Francisco Lara	1968		Spanish		
Olga Neuwirth	1968		Austrian		avant-garde
Roxanna Panufnik	1968		English	Westminster Mass	
Alwynne Pritchard	1968		British		
Victoria Borisova-Ollas	1969		Russian-Swedish	Wings of the Wind	
Nicola Campogrande	1969		Italian		
Andrea Cera	1969		Italian		Electroacoustic
Johanna Doderer	1969		Austrian		Opera
Ciarán Farrell	1969		Irish		
Pierre Kolp	1969		Belgian		avant-garde
Yannis Kyriakides	1969		Cypriot		
Jocelyn Morlock	1969		Canadian		
Patrick Nunn	1969		British		
Roy Zu-Arets	1969		American-Israeli		
Michel van der Aa	1970		Dutch	After Life	
Rodolfo Acosta	1970		Colombian		
David Bruce	1970		British-American		
Fred Momotenko	1970		Russian-Dutch		
Graziella Concas	1970		Italian		
Donnacha Dennehy	1970		Irish		
Daniel Felsenfeld	1970		American	Insomnia Redux	
Ivan Iusco	1970		Italian-American		Neoclassicism
Arlene Sierra	1970		American		
Fazıl Say	1970		Turkish	1001 Nights in the Harem, Istanbul Symphony	Piano symphony Turkish music (style)
Eric Whitacre	1970		American	Cloudburst, Lux Aurumque, Water Night	choral music
Thomas Adès	1971		English	Powder Her Face; Asyla; Traced Overhead	
Yoshino Aoki	1971		Japanese		
Richard Causton	1971		English		
Carlo Forlivesi	1971		Italian	Requiem	
Michael Hersch	1971		American	Symphony No. 1; Fracta; Arraché	
Klaus Lang	1971		Austrian		
Paweł Mykietyn	1971		Polish		
Takatomi Nobunaga	1971		Japanese	String Quartet	
Guto Puw	1971		Welsh		
Tomomi Adachi	1972		Japanese		
Natasha Barrett	1972		British		electroacoustic
Hiba Kawas	1972		Lebanese		
Bappa Mazumder	1972		Bangladeshi		
Kevin Puts	1972		American		
André Ristic	1972		Canadian		
Lera Auerbach	1973		Russian		
J. Ryan Garber	1973		American	Parabolisms; Resonances	
Nihad Hrustanbegovic	1973		Bosnian-Dutch	Stork suite; Sevdah Medieval Rhapsody	minimalism; also a composer of film music, and an improviser
Mindia Khitarishvili	1973		Georgian		
Andrew March	1973		English	Marine — à travers les arbres	
Jörg Widmann	1973		German	Fantasie for Solo Clarinet; First String Quartet	
Kristoffer Zegers	1973		Dutch		
Ehesuma	1974		Chinese		
Marek Brezovský	1974	1994	Slovak		
Derek Charke	1974		Canadian	Past Winters Solstice, for piano trio	
Julian Cochran	1974		English-born Australian		
Sophie Viney	1974		English	Music of the Spheres	
Tim Benjamin	1975		Anglo-French		
Avner Dorman	1975		Israeli		
Bongani Ndodana-Breen	1975		South African		
Olesya Rostovskaya	1975		Russian	Concert for oboe	
Đuro Živković	1975		Serbian-Swedish		
Ali Ahmadifar	1976		Iranian		
Pritom Ahmed	1976		Bangladeshi		
Svitlana Azarova	1976		Ukrainian Dutch	Diagram for 5 cellos	
Tomi Räisänen	1976		Finnish	A Walk Through the Fields of Symmetry	
Frederik Magle	1977		Danish	Concerto for organ and orchestra	
Wu Fei	1977		Chinese		
Daniel Hensel	1978		German		
Jimmy López	1978		Peruvian	Arco de luz	
Tarik O'Regan	1978		British-American	Ave Maria	
Mehdi Hosseini	1979		Iranian		
Christophe Bertrand	1981	2010	French		
Sergio Cervetti	1940		Uruguayan-American	Lux Lucet in Tenebris	
Adam Gorb	1958		Welsh	Awayday	
