= List of Belarusian composers =

This is a list of Belarusian composers of classical music who were either born on the territory of modern-day Belarus or were ethnically Belarusian.

== List by century of birth ==
=== 18th century ===
| Composer | Date | City of Birth | Notable works |
|---|---|---|---|
| Maciej Radziwiłł | 1749-1800 | Niaśviž or Warsaw | the three-act opera Wójt osady albiańskiej (‘The Headman of the Settlers at Alba’) (1786) |
| Osip Kozlovsky | 1757-1831 | Sokolovo, Slawharad District or Warsaw | Missa pro defunctis es-moll (1798), Polonaise used in "Let the Thunder of Victory Rumble!" |

=== 19th century ===
| Composer | Portrait | Date | City of Birth | Notable works |
|---|---|---|---|---|
| Napoleon Orda | | 1807-1883 | Worocewicze, Russian Empire (now Varatsevichy, Belarus) | several mazurkas, waltzes and polonaises |
| Anton Ivanavič Abramovič | | 1811-1854 | Vitebsky Uyezd, Russian Empire | |
| Flaryjan Stanislaŭ Miladoŭski | | 1819-1889 | Minsk, Russian Empire | |
| Stanislaw Moniuszko | | 1819-1872 | Ubiel, Russian Empire | |
| Michał Jelski | | 1831-1904 | Dudzicze, Russian Empire | Mazurkas and Waltzes |
| Kanstancin Antonij Kanstancinavič Horski | | 1859-1924 | Grodno Governorate, Russian Empire | |
| Uladzimier Teraŭski | | 1871-1938 | Ramanaŭ village, Minsk Governorate (currently known as the village of Lenin in the Slutsk District of Belarus) | Vajacki Marš and Kupalinka |
| Mieczysław Karłowicz | | 1876-1909 | Vishnyeva, Vilna Governorate, Russian Empire | |
| Jan Tarasiewicz | | 1880-1960 | Sokółka, Russian Empire | compositions on the lyrics of Francišak Bahuševič, Maksim Bahdanovič, Jakub Kolas; collections of belariusian folklore |
| Mikola Jakaŭlievič Ravienski | | 1886-1953 | Kaplancy, Bierazino district, Russian Empire | |
| Aliaksiej Jaŭlampavič Turankoŭ | | 1886-1958 | Saint Petersburg, Russian Empire | songs for the masses, choral works, romances |
| Anton Michajlavič Valynčyk | | 1896-1985 | Miaĺkanavičy, Russian Empire | 100 choir works and songs |
| Mikalaj Ščahloŭ-Kulikovič | | 1896-1969 | Moscow, Russian Empire | Sacred music |

=== 20th century ===
| Composer | Portrait | Date | City of Birth | Notable works |
|---|---|---|---|---|
| Isadore Freed | | 1900-1960 | Brest, Russian Empire | Triptych for violin, viola, violoncello and piano, and the choral work Postscripts |
| Michail Jaŭchimavič Krošnier | | 1900-1942 | Kiev, Russian Empire | |
| Nieścier Fiodaravič Sakaloŭski | | 1902-1950 | Vieški, Dokšycy district, Russian Empire | |
| Mikola Uladzimiravič Butoma | | 1905-1983 | Homel, Russian Empire | Sacred music |
| Kanstancin Iosifavič Paplaŭski | | 1912-1984 | Sivica, Valožyn district, Russian Empire | |
| Lieŭ Majsiejevič Abielijovič | | 1912-1985 | Vilnius, Russian Empire | |
| Anatol Vasilevič Bahatyroŭ | | 1913-2003 | Vitebsk, Russian Empire | National school of belarusian music |
| Eta (Edzi) Majsiejeŭna Tyrmand | | 1917-2008 | Russian Empire | |
| Ivan Ivanavič Kuźniacoŭ | | 1919-1986 | Cimanava, Klimavičy district, Belarusian Democratic Republic | |
| Juryj Uladzimiravič Siemianiaka | | 1925-1990 | Minsk, Belarusian SSR | |
| Jaŭhien Aliaksandravič Hliebaŭ | | 1929-2000 | Belarusian SSR | |
| Eduard Ašeravič Kazačkoŭ | | 1933- | Homel, Belarusian SSR | |
| Jakaŭ Jahoravič Kasalapaŭ | | 1934-1982 | Orša, Belarusian SSR | |
| Siarhiej Aĺbiertavič Cortez | | 1935-2016 | San Antonio, Chile | One-act operas Jubilee and The Bear |
| Dźmitryj Branislavavič Smoĺski | | 1937-2017 | Minsk, Belarusian SSR | monumental oratorios "My Motherland" (based on works of Belarusian poets) and "Poet" (based on the work and life of famous Belarusian poet Yanka Kupala) |
| Andrej Jurjevič Mdzivani | | 1937-2021 | Minsk, Belarusian SSR | |
| Uladzimir Karyzna | | 1938- | Zakruzhka, Minsk District, Belarusian SSR | hymn of Nesvizh and he co-wrote the lyrics of the Belarusian national anthem |
| Fiodar Dziamidavič Pytalieŭ | | 1938- | Usušak, Čavusy district, Belarusian SSR | |
| Ihar Michajlavič Lučanok | | 1938-2018 | Minsk, Belarusian SSR | |
| Valieryj Ivanavič Karetnikaŭ | | 1940- | Chebarkulsky District, RSFSR | |
| Eduard Semyonovich Khanok | | 1940- | Kazakh SSR | |
| Eduard Barysavič Zarycki | | 1946-2018 | Krasny Kut, Saratov Region, RSFSR | |
| Alieh Barysavič Zaliotnieŭ | | 1947-2020 | Sukhobezvodnoye, RSFSR | |
| Liudmila Karpawna Shleh | | 1948- | Baranovichy, Belarusian SSR | |
| Uladzimir Ivanavič Budnik | | 1949-2007 | Zhitkovichi, Belarusian SSR | |
| Uladzimir Piatrovič Kandrusievič | | 1949- | Hrodna, Belarusian SSR | |
| Vasil Pyatrovič Rainčyk | | 1950- | Charpy, Mogilev Region, Belarusian SSR | |
| Halina Kanstancinaŭna Harełava | | 1951- | Minsk, Belarusian SSR | |
| Uladzimir Jaŭhienavič Soltan | | 1953-1997 | Baranovichy, Belarusian SSR | |
| Viačaslaŭ Kuźniacoŭ | | 1955- | Vienna, Austria | |
| Jaŭhien Uladzimiravič Paplaŭski | | 1959- | Porazava, Belarusian SSR | |
| Uladzimir Ivanavič Zacharaŭ | | 1961- | Grodno, Belarusian SSR | |
| Aliaksandr Fiodaravič Litvinoŭski | | 1962- | Minsk, Belarusian SSR | |
| Dźmitryj Vitaĺjevič Lybin | | 1963- | Minsk, Belarusian SSR | |
| Nataĺlia Aliaksandraŭna Holubieva | | 1966- | Belarusian SSR | |
