= Felman =

Felman (Yiddish: פֿעלמאַן, Hebrew: פֶלמן, Ukrainian: Фельман, Фелман, Russian: Фельман, Фелман) is a surname. Notable people with the surname include:

- Darío (Luis) Felman (born 1951, Mendoza), Argentine footballer
- Richard (L.) Felman (1921 – 1999)
- Shoshana Felman, Hebrew: שׁוֹשַׁנָּה פֶלמן (born 1942, Yāfō), Israeli-American literary critic and professor

== See also ==
- Fellmann, Fellman
- Fehlmann, Fehlman, Vehlmann, Faehlmann
- Feldman (Yiddish: פֿעלדמאַן)
- Feldmann (Feldtmann, Feldtman)
- Ferman, Fehrmann, Fährmann
- Folman
