= Max Fishman =

Polish-Moldovan composer

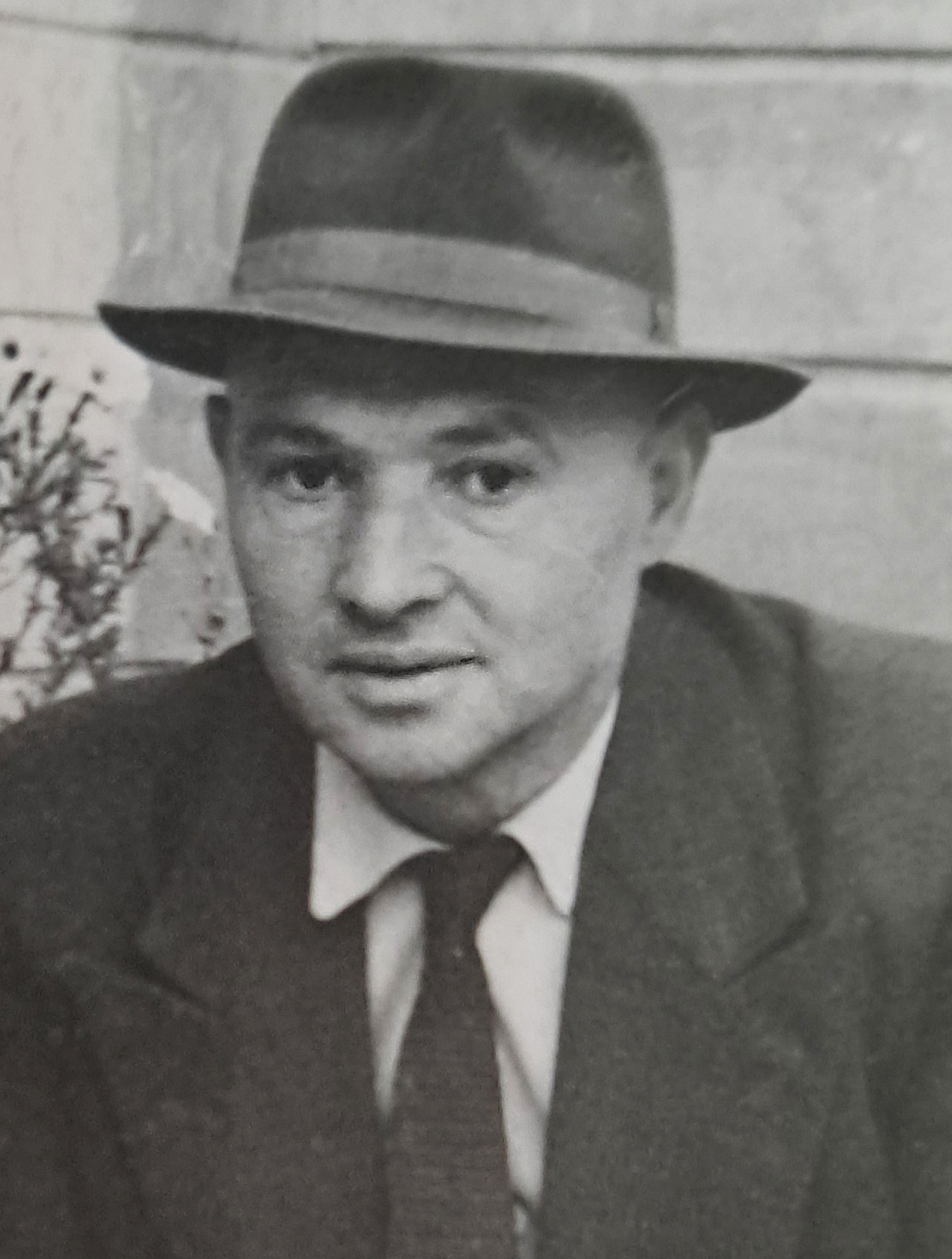
- Max Fishman in 1961
- Born: December 12, 1915; Warsaw, Congress Poland, Russian Empire
- Died: September 24, 1985 (aged 69); Chișinău, Moldavian Soviet Socialist Republic
- Occupations: Composer; Pianist; Teacher
- Years active: 1928–1985
- Awards: Medal "For Valiant Labour in the Great Patriotic War 1941–1945" Medal "Veteran of Labour" Jubilee Medal "Thirty Years of Victory in the Great Patriotic War 1941–1945" Jubilee Medal "Forty Years of Victory in the Great Patriotic War 1941–1945"
- Musical career
- Genres: Classical music

Max Shakhnovich Fishman (Polish: Mieczysław (Mietek) Fiszman /Fischman/; Romanian: Max Fișman; Russian: Макс Шахнович Фишман, known as Max Benovich Fishman), (December 12, 1915—September 24, 1985) was a Moldavian Soviet composer, pianist, and teacher. Fishman was raised within Jewish, Polish, and Russian cultural traditions..

Born in Warsaw he studied piano at the Chopin University of Music. He was well-known in the Polish music scene. During the Nazi invasion in Poland in 1939 he fled to the Soviet Union. Later he was arrested by the NKVD and deported.

In the 1950s, Fishman lived in Chișinău. He laid the pedagogical foundation of the Academy of Music, Theatre and Fine Arts in Chișinău. He composed, including piano concertos, chamber music and orchestral works. His aesthetic reflects blend of Ashkenazi Jewish folk motifs, Slavic Romanticism, and Soviet neoclassicism.

== Biography ==
=== Life in Poland ===
Max Fishman was born on December 12, 1915, in Warsaw, in the family of an entrepreneur, philanthropist and the head of the Warsaw synagogue Szachna-Benisz Fiszman (1870, Opatów – July 1, 1936, Warsaw) and Esther Fishman, née Bleiberg (1880, Ćmielów – according to some sources 1942–1943 in the Warsaw Ghetto or Treblinka extermination camp) He had six older sisters and a younger brother.

He studied piano under Józef Turczyński and composition unde Antoni Marek at the Warsaw Conservatory. As a student, he composed music and participated in concerts. He collaborated with popular Polish actresses Ida Kamińska and Lola Folman, hypnotist and illusionist Wolf Messing, and performed at the famous orphan school Janusz Korczak, where he worked as an educator in the summer months. Drafted into the army in August 1939, he joined the anti-fascist resistance during Nazi Germany's invasion of Poland on September 1.

Fleeing from Nazi persecution, on October 21, 1939, he swam and crossed the Western Bug with his nephew Pawel Gruenspan (1920–2000, a Polish pianist, composer, and leader of the Jazz Orchestra) and ended up in territory occupied by the Soviet Union under the Molotov–Ribbentrop Pact. He was arrested by the NKVD, where, instead of the surname Mieczysław (Mietek), they wrote the name Max Fishman and put him in a camp.

=== Life in the USSR ===
In the spring of 1940; Fishman narrowly avoided execution in the Katyn Massacre. Instead, he was sent to the Labor army (NKVD labor columns), effectively the Gulag. He traversed much of the USSR, working on construction sites and logging operations. In Aktyubinsk, Kazakhstan, he hauled trolleys laden with chrome ore from deep mines.

In September 1944, after a concert, where, under the leadership of Max Fishman, a group of Poles from the Labor Army performed Polish folk and patriotic songs to improve the image of the USSR in the eyes of the Polish army on the territory of the USSR, he, with frostbite on his hands and poor health, was released and sent to study at the Saratov Conservatory. In recognition of his hardships, he was later awarded the Medal "For Valiant Labour in the Great Patriotic War 1941–1945". During the war, almost all of his relatives perished in the Warsaw Ghetto. Many of them participated in the 1943 Warsaw uprising. Max Fishman's early compositions were lost.

At the Saratov Conservatory, he studied piano with professor E. M. Singer, from where he was transferred to the Minsk Conservatory in 1945. There he studied with professor G. N. Petrov (piano) and listened to lectures on composition by Professor A.V. Bogatyrev, although formally he was not his registered student. In 1945 he married Lydia Axionova. Since 1947 Мax Fishman has been repetiteur, a pianist accompanist at the Minsk Conservatory. After graduating from the Minsk Conservatory, Max Fishman had great difficulties with his job in Minsk, since at that time in the USSR there was an extensive campaign against cosmopolitanism, with anti-Semitic essence. After working at the Musical College of Gomel, he and his wife were sent to Moldavia.

Beginning in 1952, he worked at the Chisinau Conservatory (later renamed the Chișinău Institute of Arts named after G. Muzicescu, now the Academy of Music, Theater and Fine Arts) as an accompanist and piano teacher. More than a hundred students from various departments, including strings, wind and folk instruments, vocals, and acting, studied piano under Max Fishman at the Chisinau Conservatory and later became leading masters of musical and theatrical art in Moldova. He also taught piano at the Calarasi Pedagogical College and at the music school in the village Carpineni.

Max Fishman was actively involved in composing. Dozens of different genres remained in his creative portfolio the historical and artistic significance of which is confirmed by their popularity in the past. The compositions of Max Fishman have been and are still being performed by leading musical groups of Moldova – by the Symphony Orchestra Moldovan Philharmonic, the Philharmonic choir Doina, the Moldovan Jazz Orchestra "Bucuria" Moldovan Philharmonic, the Symphony Orchestra Moldovan Radio and Television, the National Chamber Orchestra in the Chișinău Organ Hall, the choir Chișinău Conservatory, the choir Chișinău Institute of Arts named after Gavriil Musicescu, the choir Chișinău Academy of Music, the choir Chișinău special music school named after E. Coca and others.

From an interview with Moldovan violinist and composer, Honored Art Worker of the Moldavian SSR, professor Boris Dubosarschi to music critic, journalist Serghei Pojar (2010):

"…In the early 60s, the organizing committee interzonal violin competition in the USSR in Moldova invited composers from all the republics to write a virtuoso work for violin, which was to be performed by all participants in the competition. To avoid accusations of dishonest choice, each composer was given a number and his name is hidden in a sealed envelope. The jury for the selection of this work was solid and mainly represented by the leadership of the Union of Composers of the USSR and Moldova. There were a lot of works for the competition, but there was little controversy, when the envelope with the number of the winning composer was publicly opened, it turned out to be Max Fishman. The responsible persons of the competition were shocked, but it was too late to change the situation, but it was necessary, due to the tension between Israel and the surrounding Arab world. Composer – a Jew did not fit. And they found a way out. There was an experience. At one of the congresses of composers, the surname Fishman on the poster was replaced with the surname Fimshan, which sounded like a Moldavian one, and this time they found a more harmonious surname – Pescaru, that translated from Romanian will be Fishman. The laureates of the competition with great pleasure performed this piece for violin by Max Benovich… and one of these winners was my classmate, the magnificent violinist Boris Goldenblank, later the first violin of the outstanding orchestras of Jurij Silantiev and Andre Rieu"

Max Fishman died on September 24, 1985, in Chișinău. He was buried at the Chisinau cemetery of St. Lazarus (also called "Doina").

=== Awards ===
- Medal "For Valiant Labour in the Great Patriotic War 1941–1945"
- Medal "Veteran of Labour"
- Jubilee Medal "Thirty Years of Victory in the Great Patriotic War 1941–1945"
- Jubilee Medal "Forty Years of Victory in the Great Patriotic War 1941–1945"

=== Family ===
His wife Lydia Axionova (July 19, 1923 — September 18, 2019) was a Soviet and Moldovan Сhoir Сonductor, the first woman Сonductor of the Symphony Orchestra in Moldova, the first in Moldova who got the academic title Professor of Сhoral Сonducting. Their sons: actor, and director Băno Axionov (b. 1946) and pianist, and teacher Artur Aksenov (b.1956).

== Selected works ==
- 4 piano concerto.
- Two trios for piano, violin, and cello. (1954–1958)
- Variations for piano
- The cycle of 5 preludes for piano (1956).
- "Mazurka. Memories of Poland" (1956).
- Cantata "Glory to Young Eagles" (dedicated to young fighters against Nazism) to the words of S. Varelopulus 1959.
- Suite for large symphony orchestra (1961).
- Piece for oboe and symphony orchestra (until 1961).
- Fantasy for small symphony orchestra.
- Capriccio E Minor for piano (1961).
- Sonatina for clarinet and piano in B (1963).
- Sonatina for piano (3 movements) (1963).
- Romance (arrangement for trombone and piano, 1963).
- 5 Preludes for Piano (Remembrance, Spring is Coming, Estrada Echoes, On the Lake, On May Day).
- Jazz Overture (1964).
- Concert piece for violin and piano (1964).
- Scherzino for clarinet and piano in B (1964).
- Scherzo (arranged for trombone and piano, 1964).
- Choir "Autumn" ("What are you rocking…?") to the words of Mihai Eminescu 1964.
- 4 studies for piano (1968).
- Sonatina for piano d-moll (3 movements) (1968).
- Prelude in e-moll for piano (1968).
- Ten Piano Pieces on Moldavian Themes (1969).
- Canon for choir (Moldovan folk song) (1973)
- Polyphonic piano cycle Canons (1976).
- Sonata for violin and piano in d-moll.
- 4 studies.
- Ten piano pieces on Moldovan themes (miniatures Dance, Variations, Olandra, Canon, Youth, Variations, Comic, Variations, Song, Jock).
- Scherzino G-dur for piano.
- Humoresque for violin and piano.
- Choir "Harvesting" to the words of Vasile Alecsandri.

=== Discography ===
In 2006, a disc was released with recordings of music by M. Fishman (from the funds of "Teleradio-Moldova", total time – 78:19.04), which included:

- Variations for piano. Performed by Lyudmila Vaverco, recorded in 1956.
- Trio on Moldovan themes for piano, violin and cello. Performed by Lyudmila Vaverco (piano), Oscar Dayn (violin), Vsevolod Dubrovsky (cello), recorded in 1958.
- Piece for oboe and orchestra. Performed by Dmitry Rotar (oboe), MSSR Radio and Television Orchestra, conductor Alexander Vasechkin, recorded in 1961.
- Sonatina for piano. Performed by Ghitlea Strakhilevich, recorded in 1963.
- Concert piece for violin and piano. Performed by Lilia Neaga (violin), Ghitlea Strakhilevich (piano) recording in 1964.
- Humoresque for violin and piano. Performed by Lilia Neaga (violin), Ghitlea Strakhilevich, (piano) recording in 1964.
- Sonata for Violin and Piano. Performed by Lilia Neaga (violin), Ghitlea Strakhilevihi (piano) recording in 1964.
- Sonata for clarinet and piano. Performed by Evgeny Verbețsky (clarinet), Ghitlea Strakhilevich, (piano) recording in 1964.
- Scherzino for clarinet and piano. Performed by Evgeny Verbețsky (clarinet), Ghitlea Strakhilevich (piano) recording in 1964.
- Capriccio for piano. Performed by Ghitlea Strakhilevich, recorded in 1964.
- Etude in G major for piano. Performed by Ghitlea Strakhilevich, recorded in 1964.
- Etude in D minor for piano. Performed by Ghitlea Strahilevici, recorded in 1964.
- Choir "Autumn" ("What are you rocking…?") to the words of Mihai Eminescu. Performed by the Conservatory Choir, conductor Lydia Axionova, recorded on June 23, 1964.
- Choir "Harvesting" to the words of Vasile Alecsandri. Performed by the Conservatory Choir, conductor Lydia Axionov, recorded on June 23, 1964.

=== Some published works ===
- Fishman M. Hunting. Chisinau: State Publishing House of Moldova, 1956 (Фишман М. La vânătoare. Chișinău: Editura de stat a Moldovei, 1956).
- Fishman M. Sonatina d-moll for piano. Chișinău: Cartea moldovenească, 1968 (Фишман М. Сонатина d-moll для фортепиано. Кишинёв: Картя Mолдовеняскэ, 1968).
- Fishman M. Prelude and four studies for pianoforte. TsGARM, F. 3050, Op. 2, D. 309. (Фишман М. Прелюдия и четыре этюда для фортепиано. ЦГАРМ, Ф. 3050, Оп. 2, Д. 309).
- Fishman M. Capriccio, Scherzino. Selected works of Moldovan composers. Chișinău: Cartea moldovenească, 1961, p. 150–172. (Фишман М. Каприччио, Скерцино. В: Избранные произведения молдавских композиторов. Кишинёв: Картя Молдовеняскэ, 1961, с. 150–172).
- Fishman M. Sonatina E-flat Major for clarinet in B. Chișinău: Cartea moldovenească, 1963. (Фишман М. Сонатина Es-dur для кларнета in B. Кишинёв: Картя Молдовеняскэ, 1963).

== Musical style ==
According to Moldovan composer, Honored Art Worker of the Moldavian SSR Vladimir Slivinsky to music critic, and journalist Serghei Pojar (2004), Fishman was a significant Moldovan composer who, despite not being an official member of the Union of Composers, was essential to it. His originality and modernity drew from both Moldovan and Jewish musical traditions, which some critics were annoyed by. Fishman's music resonated deeply with audiences, leaving no one indifferent, even among his "ill-wishers". He was known for his frankness, charm, and a supportive approach to his colleagues, focusing on constructive feedback rather than criticism. Ultimately, while the Union of Composers may have sought his influence, he did not rely on their validation for his artistic identity.

Tamara Melnik PhD wrote an article titled Composer and professor Max Fishman, where they described Fishman and his work as original, bright, and extraordinary. That his four piano concertos are considered the pinnacle of his work in this genre. The Piano Concerto in E-flat major is highlighted as a continuation of the romantic tradition and is praised for it diverse piano textures, expressive harmonic language, intense thematic and tonal development, and vivid national-colored imagery. These qualities place it among the most outstanding examples of this genre by Moldovan composers in the second half of the 20th century. From 1950 to 1970, Fishman became a significant figure in Moldova's professional composing circles. His work spans a wide range of genres, including symphonic and chamber-instrumental works, piano concertos, miniature cycles, canons, etudes, and adaptations. His compositions reflect influences of Romantic era composers such Chopin, Tchaikovsky, and Rachmaninoff. However, the originality of his works is largely attributed to their national identity. this previously unstudied work has both artistic and historical value. It contributes to the understanding of the piano concerto genre's development in Moldovan music. Pavel Borisovich Rivilis, a senior consultant at the Union of Composers of the Moldavian Soviet Socialist Republic, considers it one of the finest examples of a post-World War II piano concerto.

Irina Pleşcan, Associate Professor of the Pridnestrovian State Institute of Arts in Tiraspol, in an article titled The piano trio by M. Fishman as a sound document of its era describes Max Fishman's Trio as a musical work that encapsulates the spirit of its time, blending various musical ideas and traditions. Despite the composer's traumatic experiences during the 20th century, including the loss of family members in the Holocaust and his own hardships, Fishman maintained an optimistic outlook that is evident in his music. The composition reflects the strong impact of Russian music on both Moldovan and Polish musical cultures. Fishman's work is characterized by its ability to assimilate diverse compositional techniques while preserving and expressing the composer's ethnic and cultural identity. This fusion of influences and personal experiences results in a unique musical voice that reflects both the composer's individual journey and the broader cultural context of mid-20th century Eastern European music.

Victoria Tcacenco PhD, in an article titled Overture by Max Fişman in Prfofessional European Music and the Third Layer Interaction Context, discusses Fishman's Overture. It is a musical composition that exists solely in written form, with no surviving recordings. Analysis of the score reveals that the work is characterized by its bright and theatrical qualities, rich contrasts, and accessibility to a broad audience. The composition employs a democratic musical language, drawing on rhythms from everyday genres and synthesizing elements of Moldavian folklore along with popular "mass music." Fishman demonstrates a strong mastery of listener perception, making the overture engaging and relatable. It is considered one of the notable examples of everyday music from its time, preserving important insights into the musical culture of that era.

== Sources ==
- Yan Toporovsky: He chose life in hell (Он выбрал жизнь в аду, газета "Наш голос". 1990, № 19.)
- Serghei Pojar, music critic and journalist: ‘’Not broken by fate. To the 90th anniversary of the composer, pianist, teacher Max Fishman’’ (“Не сломленный судьбой: К 90-летию композитора и пианиста Макса Фишмана”, газета “Еврейское местечко”, № 46 (115), декабрь 2005 г.)
- Tamara Melnik, associate professor, PhD in the study of arts: Composer and Professor Max Fishman Ministerul Culturii al Republicii Moldova. Acadmia de Muzică, Teatru şi Arte Plastice. In: Anuar ştiinţific: muzică, teatru, arte plastice, 2011, nr. 1-2(12–13), pp. 85–90. ISSN 1857-2251
- Victoria Tcacenco, associate professor, PhD in the study of arts: Overture by Max Fişman in Prfofessional European Music and the Third Layer Interaction Context Ministerul Culturii al Republicii Moldova. Acadmia de Muzică, Teatru şi Arte Plastice. In: Anuar Ştiinţific: Muzică, Teatru, Arte Plastice 2012, nr. 3 pp. 238 – 244 ISSN 1857-2251
- Tamara Melnik, associate professor, PhD in the study of arts: The Concerto for Piano and Orchestra Es-dur by M. Fishman in the Romanticism Traditions Context Ministerul Culturii al Republicii Moldova. Acadmia de Muzică, Teatru şi Arte Plastice. In:Anuar Ştiinţific: Muzică, Teatru, Arte Plastice 2012, nr. 4 pp. 59 – 64 ISSN 1857-2251
- Pleșcan Irina, vice-rector, Institute of Arts, Tiraspol: The piano trio by M. Fishman as a sound document of its era Ministerul Culturii al Republicii Moldova. Acadmia de Muzică, Teatru şi Arte Plastice. Studiul Artelor şi Culturologie: istorie, teorie, practică – NR. 2 (25), 2015 pp. 66 – 76 ISSN 2345-1408
- Cuzneţova Nadejda, senior lecturer: Historical chronology of the cantatas by the composers from the RepublIc of Moldova: the 1950s" (composers – V. Zagorschi, S. Löbel, Z. Tkaci, S. Lungul, M. Fishman, G. Borş) Studiul Artelor şi Culturologie: Istorie, Teorie, Practică – NR. 2 (25), 2015 pp. 132 – 144 ISSN 2345-1408
- Ilana Elizarova: "Without the right to create. To the 100th anniversary of the composer, pianist, teacher Max Fishman" Jewish World (newspaper of Russian-speaking America) 01/09/2015
- Olga Bulychevskaya, journalist and art critic: Music enlivens life. To the 100th anniversary of the birth of composer Max Fishman Information and analytical portal AVA.MD November 4, 2015
- Ольга Беженару, Вероника Каждан Композитор, пианист и педагог Макс Фишман Альманах Еврейская старина № 1 (124) 2025 года
