= Lydia Axionova =

Soviet- Moldovan conductor (1923–2019)

- Lidia Axionov
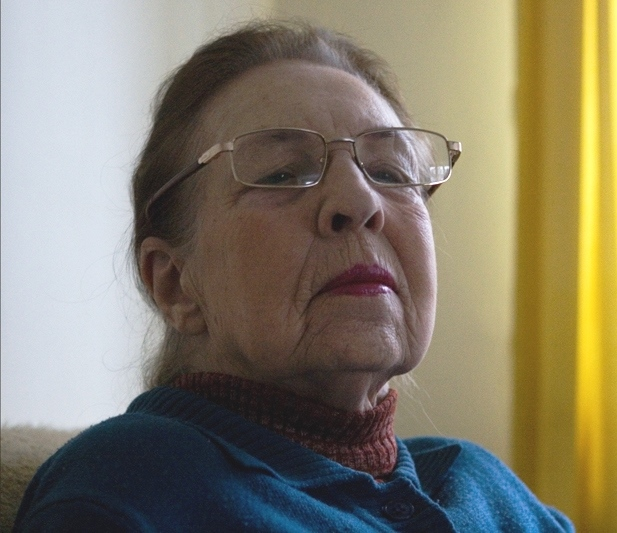
- Axionova in 2017
- Born: July 19, 1923; Engels, Saratov Oblast, Soviet Union
- Died: September 18, 2019 (aged 96); Chișinău, Moldova
- Occupations: Conductor, professor of choral conducting
- Years active: 1941–2019
- Spouse: Max Fishman
- Children: Beno Axionov; Artur Aksenov
- Awards: Honored Artist of the Moldavian SSR.: Order of Work Glory; Order of Honour (Moldova); Medal "Veteran of Labour"

Lydia Valeryanovna Axionova (Romanian: Lidia Axionov; Russian: Лидия Валерьяновна Аксенова; 19 July 1923 – 18 September 2019) was a Soviet and Moldovan conductor, music teacher, choral theorist, music writer, the first professor of choral conducting in Moldova, the first female symphony orchestra conductor in the Republic, and an Honoured Artist of the Moldavian SSR.

== Biography ==
Axionova was born into the family of lawyer Valerian Mikhailovich Axionov (Aksenov) (06.01.1894 – January 26, 1980) and teacher Klavdiya Ivanovna Aksenova (née Zhivaeva) (December 31, 1892 – June 14, 1967). In 1941, she graduated from school with medal for special distinction and during the Eastern Front (World War II) by order of her superiors, she taught German in the senior grades of the comprehensive school in the city of Krasnoarmeysk, Saratov Oblast. From 1942 to 1944, she studied at the Saratov State Medical University and worked as a nurse at the Military hospital. In 1944, she entered the Saratov Conservatory in the vocal class (class of Professor Alevtina Paskhalova. From 1945 to 1952, she studied at the Belarusian State Academy of Music in the symphony conducting class with Professor Samuil Ratner and in the choral conducting class with Professor Nikolai Maslov. As a conductor, Axionova is the heir to the best Russian conducting and choral traditions. The "pedigree" in symphonic conducting before S. L. Ratner, includes the names of Ilya Musin (conductor), Nicolai Malko, Nikolai Tcherepnin and Nikolai Rimsky-Korsakov. In the field of choral conducting, Axionova's "genealogy" again goes back to Nikolai Rimsky-Korsakov – his students Mikhail Ippolitov-Ivanov, Pavel Chesnokov and N. F. Maslov.

From 1952 to 2015, she taught at the Chișinău Conservatory (later renamed the Chișinău Institute of Arts named after Gavriil Musicescu, currently the Academy of Music, Theater and Fine Arts).

Axionova's teaching, scientific, and performing activities lasted more than 70 years; during this time, she trained more than 350 specialists. The school of choral conducting she created is known far beyond Moldova, and its training system is passed down from generation to generation. Many of her students successfully work not only in Moldova, but also in many countries worldwide – in Romania, Russia, Ukraine, Germany, Israel, Turkey, US, France, Austria, Belgium, Spain, and other countries. Among them are outstanding musicians, people's Artist of the USSR, people's Artist of Moldova, Russia, and Ukraine, honored artists, honored artists, laureates of numerous international festivals and competitions, professors, associate professors and doctors of science: Teodor Zgureanu, Sofia Rotaru, Eduard Markin, Ilona Stepan, Nikolay Cholak, Svetlana Popova, Tatiana Tverdokhleb, Larisa Vishnevaya, Vasily Kondrea, Veronica Galesku, Mikhail Magalnik, Ivan Melnik, Alexey Vinogradsky, Larisa Balaban, Luminiţa Stoyan (Guţanu), Irina Cholak, Ekaterina Yankovskaya, Natalia Konstantin (Sprinčan), Svetlana Siloch, Vyacheslav Obruchkov, Tatiana Fanyan, Harry Dubenko, Mikhail Rymarev and many others. Among the students of the conservatory, to whom Axionova taught courses of choral music and reading choral scores, was Veronica Garștea, who later became the Chief Conductor of the Capella Doina National Philharmonic Society, People's Artist of the USSR

Lydia Axionova was the first in Moldova to be awarded the academic scientific title of professor of the choral conducting department by the Higher Attestation Commission.

In 1964, in parallel with her work at the Chișinău Institute of Arts named after G. Muzicescu, Axionova created the choir of the Special Music School named after E. Koka and led it until 1979. The group performed about 200 works, including major pieces of Russian and foreign classics and avant-garde. Many scores were dedicated to the choir by Moldovan composers who had never thought of writing for children before. A film called "My Moldova" was made about the choir, its concerts were held at prestigious concert venues, and broadcast on radio and television. The choir was awarded the title "Exemplary", people began to imitate it, and new children's choirs began to be organized throughout Moldova. More than a thousand young people passionate about choral singing passed through the professor's hands, and many subsequently became prominent representatives of Moldovan art. She initiated the Song Festival in Moldova: at the 1st, 2nd and 3rd of them, she led a combined choir, the composition of which increased from 700 to 10,000 children.

Axionova's versatile activities played an important role in developing Moldovan musical art. At various times, she headed the department of choral conducting at the Academy of Music, the orchestra at the State Russian Drama Theater A. P. Chekhov (becoming the first woman in the republic to take the conductor's stand of a symphony orchestra), she led the conservatory choir and preparation for opera performances, was repeatedly appointed chairperson of state examination commissions at higher and secondary musical institutions, headed the Choral Society and was a member of the leadership of the Union of Musical Workers of Moldova.

Lydia Axionova is the author of dozens of textbooks, repertoire reference books, and training programs in the specialty of choral conducting for students of higher and secondary musical educational institutions, published in Chișinău and Moscow. She was the author of many articles and reviews in newspapers and magazines, and her warm memories of the colleagues with whom she worked over the years fill in the gaps in the history of musical art in Moldova.

Lydia Axionova died on September 18, 2019, in Chișinău. She was buried next to her husband at the Chișinău cemetery of St. Lazarus (also called "Doina").

Olga Bejenaru, Veronica Kazhdan, in an article titled The first professor of choral conducting in Moldova (on the occasion of the 100th anniversary of the birth of L.V. Axionova).

"... We, more than ever, realize the scale of her personality, which amazingly combined intelligence and devotion to art, depth and spiritual wisdom, kindness and innate sensitivity, majestic stature, and inner fragility. Her name – Lydia Valeryanovna Axionova – has already been inscribed in that golden book where there is a place only for the great. "

=== Family ===
Her husband Max Fishman composer, pianist, and teacher. Their sons: actor, and director Beno Axionov (b. 1946) and pianist, and teacher Artur Aksenov (b.1956).

=== Awards ===
- Medal "Veteran of Labour" (civilian labor award of the Soviet Union) (12.01.1983)
- Honored Artist of the Moldavian SSR.
- Order of Work Glory (is a Moldovan official order conferred for outstanding achievements in an individual's field of work, esteemed public activity during their career) (December 17, 2000)
- Order of Honour (Moldova) (is a state order of the Republic of Moldova. It is the fourth highest distinction of Moldova) October 12, 2013)

=== Books and articles ===
- Axionova, Lidia Valeryanovna. "Rehearsals with the choral ensemble": [methodical textbook] / Chișinău: Cartea Moldoveneasca, 1966. – 56 p. – with Cyrillic letters. ("Repetiţiile cu ansamblul coral": [indicații metod.] / Chișinău: Cartea Moldovenească, 1966. – 56 p. – Ed. cu caractere chirilice). ("Репетиции с хоровым коллективом": [методический сборник] / Кишинев: Cartea Moldovenească 1966 г., 56 стр. – с буквами на кириллице)
- L. Axionova "Songs of Belarus" newspaper "Soviet Moldavia" Chișinău 1970. (Л. Аксёнова "Песни Белоруссии" газета "Советская Молдавия" Кишинёв 1970 г.)
- L. V. Axionova, E.М. Bogdanovschi "Moldovan choral music" / Chișinău: Cartea Moldovenească, 1972. – 52 p. – with Cyrillic letters. ("Muzică corală moldovenească" / Chișinău: Cartea Moldovenească, 1972. – 52 p. – Ed. cu caractere chirilice). ("Молдавская хоровая музыка" / Кишинев: Cartea Moldoveneasca, 1972. – 52 стр. – с буквами на кириллице).
- Axionova L.V. "Choral class in a secondary special music school" – Moscow, 1973. ("Clasa de cor în școala muzicală medie de specialitate" — Moscova, 1973). ("Хоровой класс в средней специальной музыкальной школе" – Москва, 1973 г.)
- Axionova, Lydia Valeryanovna. "A course of lectures on foreign choral literature" / Chișinău: State Institute of Arts named after G. Musicescu, Department of Choral Conducting. – Chișinău, 1976. – 125 p. – is in the AMTAP Library. ("Курс лекций по зарубежной хоровой литературе" / Гос ин-т искусств им. Г. Музическу, Кафедра хорового дирижирования. – Кишинeв, 1976. – 125 с. – находится в библиотеке AMTAP).
- Axionova, Lydia Valeryanovna. "Soviet choral literature": method. allowance for correspondence students. Part 1 / State Institute of Arts named after G. Musicescu, Department of Choral Conducting. – Chișinău, 1977. – 125 p. – is in the AMTAP Library. ("Советская хоровая литература": метод. пособие для заочников. Часть 1 / Государственный ин-т искусств им. Г. Музическу, Кафедра хорового дирижирования. – Кишинев, 1977. – 125 с. – находится в библиотеке AMTAP)
- Axionova, Lidia Valeryanovna. "Soviet choral literature": method. allowance for correspondence students. Part 2 / State Institute of Arts named after G. Musicescu, Department of Choral Conducting. – Chișinău, 1978. – 125 р. – is in the AMTAP Library. ("Советская хоровая литература": метод. пособие для заочников. Часть 2 / Государственный ин-т искусств им. Г. Музическу, Кафедра хорового дирижирования. – Кишинев, 1978 – 125 стр. – находится в библиотеке AMTAP)
- Axionova, Lidia Valeryanovna. "The role of the Institute of Arts in the development of children's choral singing in Moldova" / Chișinău State Institute of Arts named after G. Musicescu – Chișinău, 1980. ("Роль Института искусств в развитии детского хорового пения в Молдавии" / Кишиневский гос. ин-т искусств им. Г. Музическу – Кишинeв, 1980)
- L. Axionova / "Problems of educating a young specialist in a university of culture" / Chișinău State Institute of Arts named after G. Musicescu – Chișinău, 1980. ("Проблемы воспитания молодого специалиста в вузе культуры" / Кишиневский гос. ин-т искусств им. Г. Музическу. – Кишинeв, 1980)
- Axionova, Lydia. "Life in music": [on the activities of the choirmaster and teacher G. Strezev] / newspaper "Evening Chișinău" – 1994. – July 7. ("Жизнь в музыке": [о деятельности хормейстера и педагога Г. Стрезева] / газета "Вечерний Кишинёв" – 1994. – 7 июля)
- Axionova L.V. "Gheorghe Strezev". Chișinău: Inessa, 2003, 96 р. ("Георгий Стрезев" – Кишинев: Инесса, 2003 г. 96 стр.)
- L. V. Axionova "Moldavian composers for children": Methodical essay on the specialty "choral conducting" / Chișinău: Academy of Music, Theater and Fine Arts, 2008, 30 р, ISBN 978-9975-9999-4-6. ("Молдавские композиторы детям": Методический очерк по специальности "хоровое дирижирование" / Кишинёв: Академия Музыка, театр и изобразительных искусств, 2008 г., 30 стр., ISBN 978-9975-9999-4-6)

=== Sources ===
- V. Masyukov, executive secretary of the Union of Composers of the MSSR "Children sing" newspaper "Youth of Moldova" 1965. (В. Масюков, ответственный секретарь Союза композиторов МССР "Поют Дети" газета "Молодёжь Молдавии" 1965 г.)
- Bogdanovschi, Efim, Honored Art Worker of the Moldavian SSR, "Serving Music": [about L. V. Axionova, teacher of the Department of Choral Conducting] / newspaper "Soviet Moldavia" – 1983. December 17. (Богдановский, Ефим, Заслуженный деятель искусств МССР. "Служение музыке": [о Л. В. Аксёновой, педагоге кафедры хорового дирижирования] / газета "Советская Молдавия" – 1983. 17 декабря)
- Larisa Balaban, associate professor, PhD in the study of arts, "Secrets of the Axionov School" magazine "Moldova" No.12 2009. (Лариса Балабан, доцент, кандидат искусствоведения, "Секреты Аксеновской школы" журнал "Молдова" No.12 2009)
- Strezeva A. People's Artist from the Republic of Moldova "Hundreds of lyat!" – "Many years" // "Russian Word" – Moldova, "Russian Word", 2012. – ISSN 1857-2839. (Стрезева А. "Сто лят!.." — "Многая лета" // "Русское слово". — Молдова, "Русское слово", 2012. — ISSN 1857-2839)
- Aksiniya Galkina, art critic "Theory of fidelity" newspaper "Nezavisimaya Moldova" July 18, 2008.] (Аксиния Галкина искусствовед «Теория верности» газета "Независимая Молдова" July 18, 2008) https://www.nm.md/article/teoriya-vernosti/
- Serghei Pojar, composer, and musicologist "Let's congratulate the professor in chorus" newspaper "Chișinău news" July 18, 2008. (Сергей Пожар, композитор, музыковед "Поздравим профессора хором" газета "Кишинёвские новости" July 18, 2008)
- Larisa Balaban: ‘’The mysteries of Lidia Axionova’s school’’ Magazine Moldova 09 2009
- Dmitry Kitsenko, composer, Meritorious Artist of Moldova "Outstanding teacher and conductor Lidia Valerianovna Aksenova turns 96". (Дмитрий Киценко, композитор, заслуженный деятель искусств Молдовы «Выдающемуся педагогу и дирижеру Лидии Валериановне Аксеновой – 96 лет») https://dem-2011.livejournal.com/589111.html
- Anna Strezeva, People's Artist from the Republic of Moldova "RUSSIAN CHARACTER", newspaper "RUSSIAN SLOVO" No. 7 (364), February 24, 2012. (Анна Стрезева, Народная артистка Молдовы "РУССКИЙ ХАРАКТЕР" газета "РУССКОЕ СЛОВО" No. 7 (364), 24 февраля 2012 г.)
- Mikhail Dreyzler, journalist, art critic "Musical offering to the hero of the day" | Culture | Jewish news portal of Moldova. 12/11/13. (Михаил Дрейзлер, журналист, искусствовед "Музыкальное приношение юбилярше" | Культура | Еврейский новостной портал Молдовы.12/11/13)
- Teodor Zgureanu, university professor, People's Artist from the Republic of Moldova. Emilia Moraru, associate professor, PhD in the study of arts "VIVAT ACADEMY, VIVAT PROFESORES" "Literatura si Arta" newspaper Wednesday, July 2, 2014. (Teodor Zgureanu, prof. univ., Artist al Poporului din Republica Moldova. Emilia Moraru, conf. univ., dr. în studiul artelor "VIVAT ACADEMIA, VIVAT PROFESORES" Ziarul "Literatura si Arta" Miercuri, 2 Iulie 2014)
- Balaban, Larisa, associate professor, PhD in the study of arts, "Features of studying the works of composers from the Republic of Moldova in the class of Professor L. V. Axionova" / Larisa Balaban // Patrimoniul muzical din Republica Moldova (Folclor şi creaţie componistică) în contemporaneitate: conf. st. intern., Chișinău, June 23. 2015: rez. comunicarilor. – Chișinău, 2015. – P. 63–65. (Балабан, Лариса, доцент, кандидат искусствоведения, "Особенности изучения произведений композиторов Республики Молдова в классе профессора Л. В. Аксёновой" / Лариса Балабан // Музыкальное наследие Республики Молдова (фольклорно-композиционное творчество) в современности: международная конференция, Кишинев, 23 июня. 2015: рез. коммуникации. – Кишинев, 2015. – с. 63–65)
- Victoria Mihai, journalist "In search of goodness and true. Axionovs". "Information and analytical portal AVA.MD" December 4, 2017. (Виктория Михай "В поисках добра и истины. Аксеновы". "Информационно-аналитический портал AVA.MD" 4 декабря 2017) https://ava.md/2017/12/04/v-poiskah-dobra-i-istiny-aksenovy/
- L.I. Balaban, associate professor, PhD in the study of arts, "Outstanding figures of the choral culture of the Republic of Moldova in the light of the traditions of the Russian choir school" (network electronic scientific journal Academia: musicology, performance, pedagogy. 2 (3) 2022. (Л.И. Балабан, доцент, кандидат искусствоведения, "Выдающиеся деятели хоровой культуры Республики Молдова в свете традиций русской хоровой школы" (сетевой электронный научный журнал Academia: музыкознание, исполнительство, педагогика. 2 (3) 2022)
- Olga Bejenaru, Veronica Kazhdan, art critics "The first professor of choral conducting in Moldova (on the occasion of the 100th anniversary of the birth of L.V. Axionova)". "Information and analytical portal AVA.MD" February 23, 2023. (Ольга Беженару, Вероника Каждан, искусствоведы "Первый профессор хорового дирижирования Молдовы. К 100-летию со дня рождения Л.В. Аксёновой". Информационно-аналитический портал AVA.MD" 23 февраля 2023) https://web.archive.org/web/20230620035303/https://ava.md/2023/02/23/pervyy-professor-horovogo-dirizhirovaniya/

=== Recordings ===
Master class by Lidia Axionova (2008) – YouTube (Мастер-класс Лидии Аксёновой в 2008 году) – YouTube) https://www.youtube.com/watch?v=QaoB6JZhFuI&t=6s
