= Folman =

Folman is a surname. Notable people with the surname include:

- Ari Folman (born 1962), Israeli film director, film score composer, animator, and screenwriter
- Lola Folman (1908–1979), Polish singer and composer
- Ron Folman (born 1963), Israeli quantum physicist and social activist

== See also ==
- Felman
- Folan
- Polman
