= Yeshayahu Folman =

Israeli academic and Auschwitz extermination camp survivor

- ישעיהו פולמן
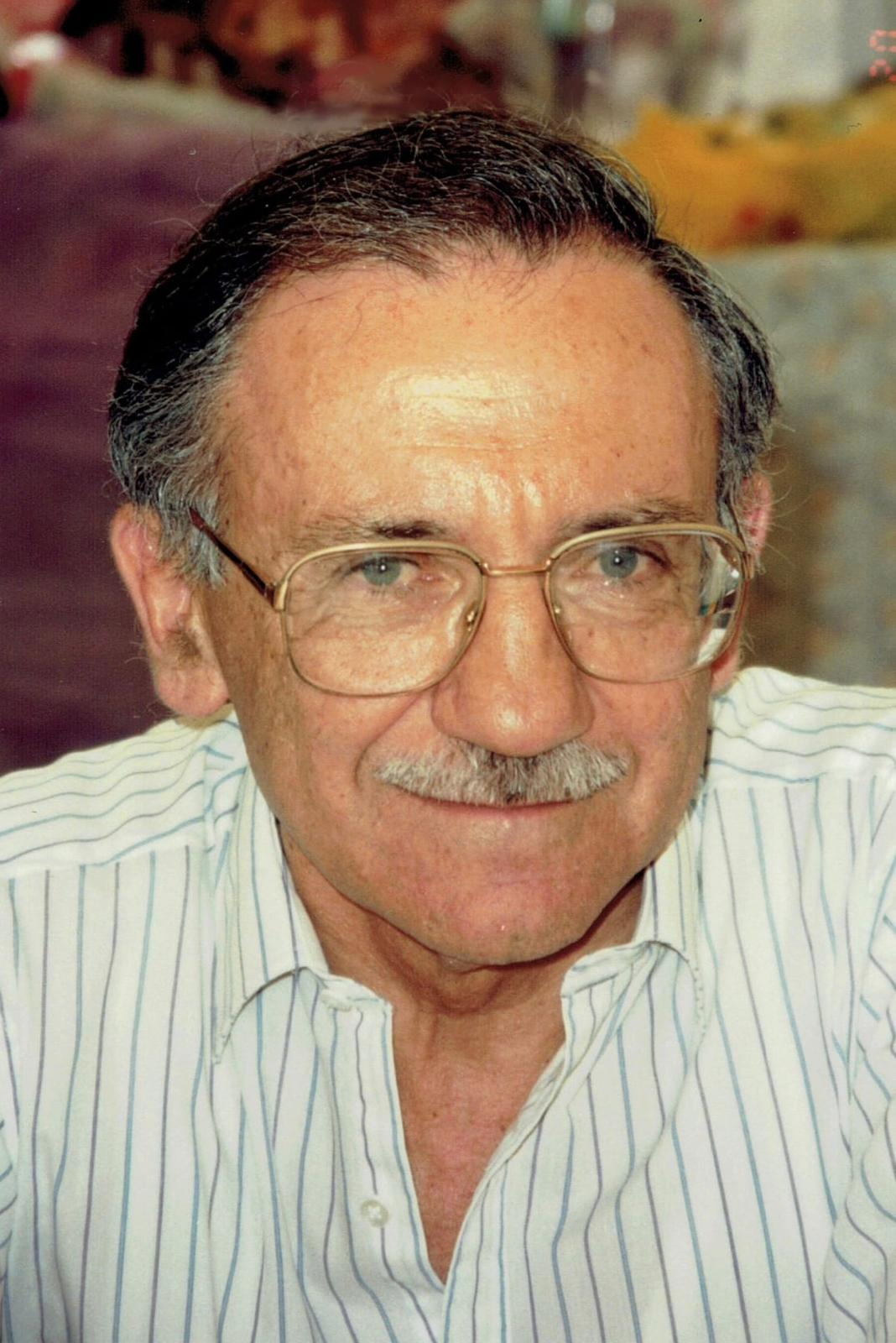
- Born: Yeshayahu Folman; 14 January 1934; Piotrków, Poland
- Died: 3 August 2022 (aged 88); Rehovot, Israel
- Spouse: Dr. Ahuva (Luba) Gordon
- Children: 3

Yeshayahu Folman (Hebrew: ישעיהו פולמן; January 14, 1934 – August 3, 2022) was a professor of biology and agriculture at the Hebrew University, the director of the Animal Institute at the Volcani Center for Scientific Research, and the Chief Scientist at the Israel Ministry of Agriculture. He was a survivor of the Auschwitz extermination camp. Folman authored the book "The Story of the Security Fence: Life Forsaken, Indeed?" ("סיפורה של גדר ההפרדה, האמנם הפקרת חיים?").

== Early life and education ==
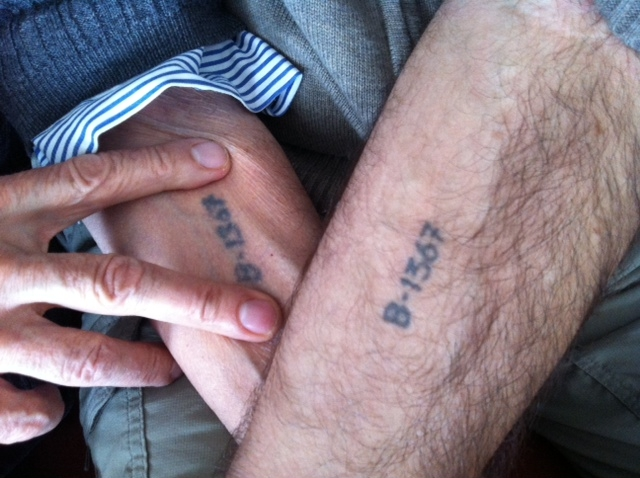
Yeshayahu's arm together with his Son's arm, who tattooed an exact copy in solidarity with his father's suffering

Folman was born in 1934, to Rachel (Rooja) Pitowski and Aharon Folman in Piotrków, Poland. In 1943, at the age of 9, he was captured and sent to a forced labor camp. He was later sent by the Nazi regime to the Auschwitz concentration and extermination camp. At Auschwitz, a number was tattooed on his arm, and he became prisoner B-1367. His son, Ron Folman, later had the number B-1367 precisely tattooed on his own arm. In January 1945, after falling ill, Yeshayahu Folman was sent on a death march.

== Professional life ==
In 1959 Folman began his professional career at the Agricultural Research Station in Rehovot, later becoming a senior researcher. In 1985, he was appointed a full professor in the Faculty of Agriculture at the Hebrew University.

In 1991 he was appointed by the Minister of Agriculture, Raphael Eitan, as the Chief Scientist at the Ministry of Agriculture.

Prof. Folman is known as the person who completely reformed the criteria by which budgets are distributed so that excellence would become the main criterion. In 1995, with the end of his tenure as Chief Scientist, he returned to the Volcani Center, where he remained until his retirement.

In 1995 Folman worked at the United Nations Center in Vienna.

In 1999,Folman retired and on August 3, 2022, he died at the age of 88.

== Publications ==
Folman published over 100 scientific articles. His main work revolved around the relationship between nutrition, the level of milk production, and fertility in high-yielding dairy cows. His research was published in prestigious journals and the methods he developed following his scientific discoveries gained worldwide attention. When he became the Chief Scientist of the Ministry of Agriculture, he expanded his expertise to all branches of the agricultural economy in the State of Israel. His extensive overview of the Israeli agricultural economy can be found, among other publications, in the book "Israel’s Jubilee" ("יובל לישראל") edited by Haim Yavin.

In 2004 he wrote the book "The Story of the Security Fence: Life Forsaken, Indeed?". He also published opinion articles in the press, primarily focusing on the pursuit of peace.
