= Daniel Binelli =

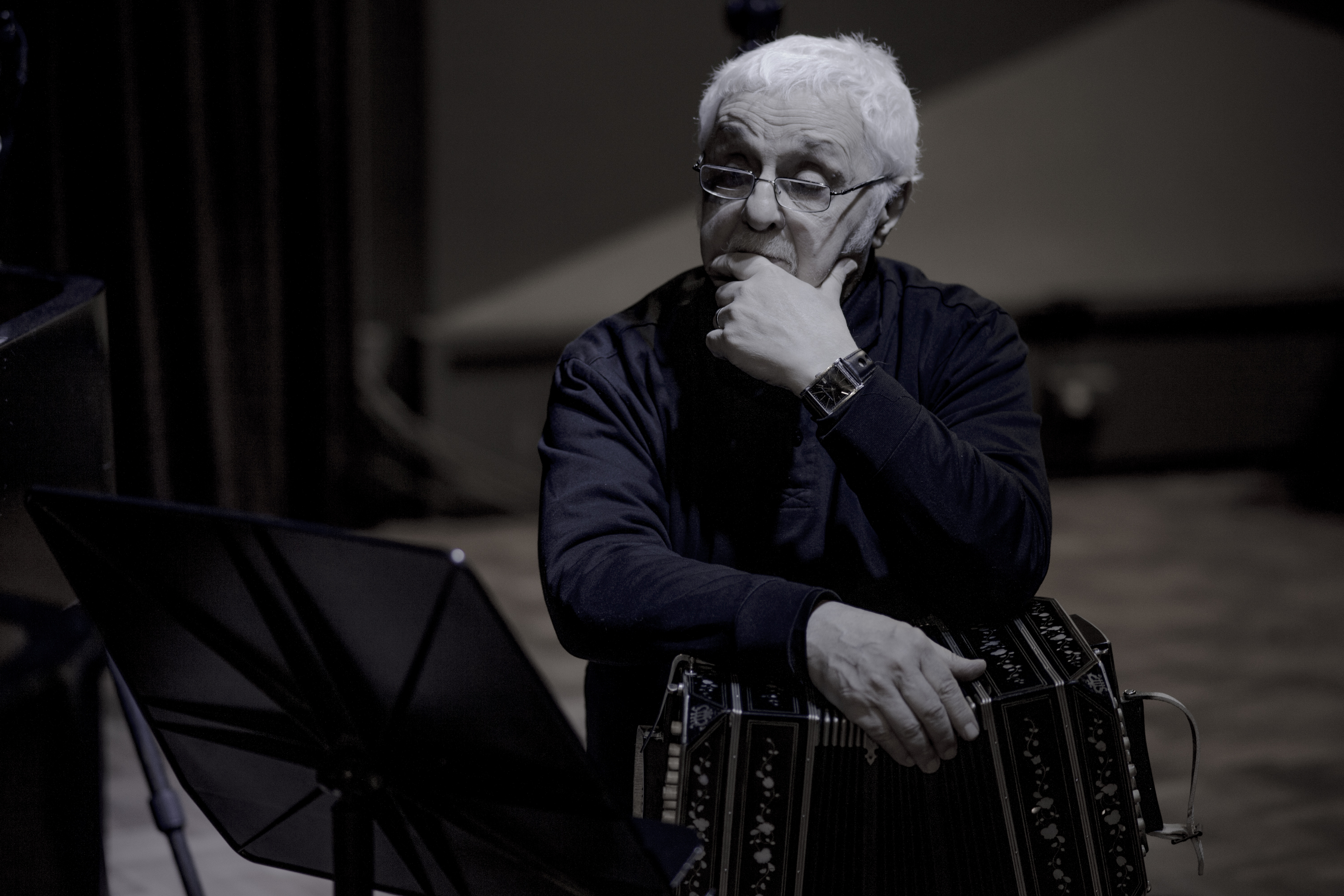
- Born: Daniel Binelli; Quilmes, Argentina
- Occupation: Musician
- Years active: 1968 to present
- Spouse: Polly Ferman
- Website: https://www.danielbinelli.com

Daniel Binelli (Quilmes, Buenos Aires, Argentina; May 20, 1946), is a musical composer, orchestra director, and Argentine bandoneonist that plays tango and classical music.

He was a member and arranger of the Osvaldo Pugliese orchestra, a member of the Astor Piazzolla Nuevo Tango Sextet, a musician and arranger of the group Tango7, based in Switzerland, and musical director of the group Tango Metrópolis and the Daniel Binelli Quintet.

Among his most notable performances is the premiere of Astor Piazzolla's Liège Concerto for bandoneon and guitar, held in Tokyo in 1998, alongside Martha Argerich, guitarist Eduardo Isaac and the National Symphony Orchestra of Argentina conducted by director Pedro Ignacio Calderón.

He recorded more than 50 albums, including Tangazo with the Montreal Symphony Orchestra, Orquestango with pianist Polly Ferman and the Uruguayan Philharmonic Orchestra, Imágenes with Polly Ferman, Daniel Binelli Tango, Daniel Binelli and the Camerata Bariloche, Daniel Binelli, Astor Piazolla and the Sexteto Tango Nuevo, Daniel Binelli – Issac (Bandoneon and guitar) and Bandoneon as soloist.

In 1997 Binelli participated in the documentary film Quereme así (Piantao).

He received the Konex Award - Diploma of Merit in 1995 as one of the most important tango instrumentalists of the '90s.

== Discography ==
- Piazzolla Hoy (con la Orquesta Estable del Teatro Colón dirigida por José Carli), EMI, 1993
- Piazzolla Clásico (con la Camerata Bariloche), MILAN SUR, 1994
- ¡Tango! (con el Septeto de Daniel Binelli), DORIAN, 1994
- Atardecer Antiguo/Bandoneón (con Hugo Romero), MELOPEA, 1996
- Piazzollando ao vivo, KUARUP, 1997
- Borges & Piazzolla, MILAN, 1997
- Milva El tango de Astor Piazzolla (Quinteto Argentino de Daniel Binelli), KING (Japón), 1998
- Argentine Masters, TESTIGO, 1998
- El Bandoneón, RANDOM, 1999
- El Tango (con Cecilia Rossetto), BLACK SUN, 1999
- Encuentros...con el Tango (con Alicia Terzian & el Grupo Encuentros), DOM, 1999
- La Música Argentina y el Tango (con Eduardo Issac), KING (Japón), 2000
- Rojotango (con Cecilia Rossetto), LA CASONA, 2000
- Tangazo (Charles Dutoit y la Orquesta Sinfónica de Montreal), DECCA, 2001
- Imágenes (con Polly Ferman), EPSA Music, 2002
- Tangos de Buenos Aires (con Linda Lee Thomas), CBC, 2002
- Tango Metrópolis (Quinteto de Daniel Binelli), 2002
- Imágenes (con Polly Ferman), ROMEO RECORDS, 2002
- Orquestango (con Polly Ferman & Filarmónica de Montevideo), SONDOR, 2003
- Tango Natural (con César Angeleri), RANDOM, 2003
- Tango in The Night (con Polly Ferman, German Guitierrez, Leanne Nicholls y La Orquesta de Cámara de la Ciudad de Hong Kong) ORCHID CLASSICS, 2021

== See also ==
- Tango
- Astor Piazzolla
- Osvaldo Pugliese
- Polly Ferman
