= Tyrmand =

Tyrmand is a surname. Notable people with the surname include:

- Eta Tyrmand (1917–2008), Belarusian composer
- Leopold Tyrmand (1920–1985), Polish novelist, writer and editor
