= Vladimir Soltan =

Belarusian composer

Vladimir Yevgenievich Soltan (Belarusian: Уладзімір Яўгенавіч Солтан, Russian: Владимир Евгеньевич Солтан; 9 January 1953 – 1 June 1997) was a Belarusian composer. He was born in Baranovichi. He graduated from the Minsk Conservatory in 1979, and as post graduate in 1981 from the composition class of Anatoly Bogatyrev. He died in Minsk.

== Works ==
- opera - Lady Jadwiga «Пани Ядвига»
- The wild hunt of king Stah(1989)
- film music for Yurka son of the commander.
- Symphonic Overture (1974),
- Variations (1976)
- Symphony: I (1979)
- Symphony No.2 "In memory of the Minsk Underground" (1983)
- "Thoughts and feelings" for string orchestra, oboe, flute and French horn (1977)
- Nocturne (1974), for strings, vibraphone and oboe
- Lyrical Cantata (to the words of Y. Kolasa, 1978) for voice, mixed choir and chamber orchestra
- Two songs on words by A. Tarkovsky 1977
- Five songs (1981)
- Cycle of songs (1986)

== Recordings ==
- Symphony No 2. Symphonic Poem. Melody and Chorale for cello & piano. Concerto for cello 1992
