= Fehrman =

Fehrman is a surname. Notable people with the surname include:

- Carl Fehrman (1915–2010), Swedish literary historian
- Trevor Fehrman (born 1981), American actor and writer

== See also ==
- Fährmann
