= Marina Osman =

Marina Osman Марина Викторовна Васильева
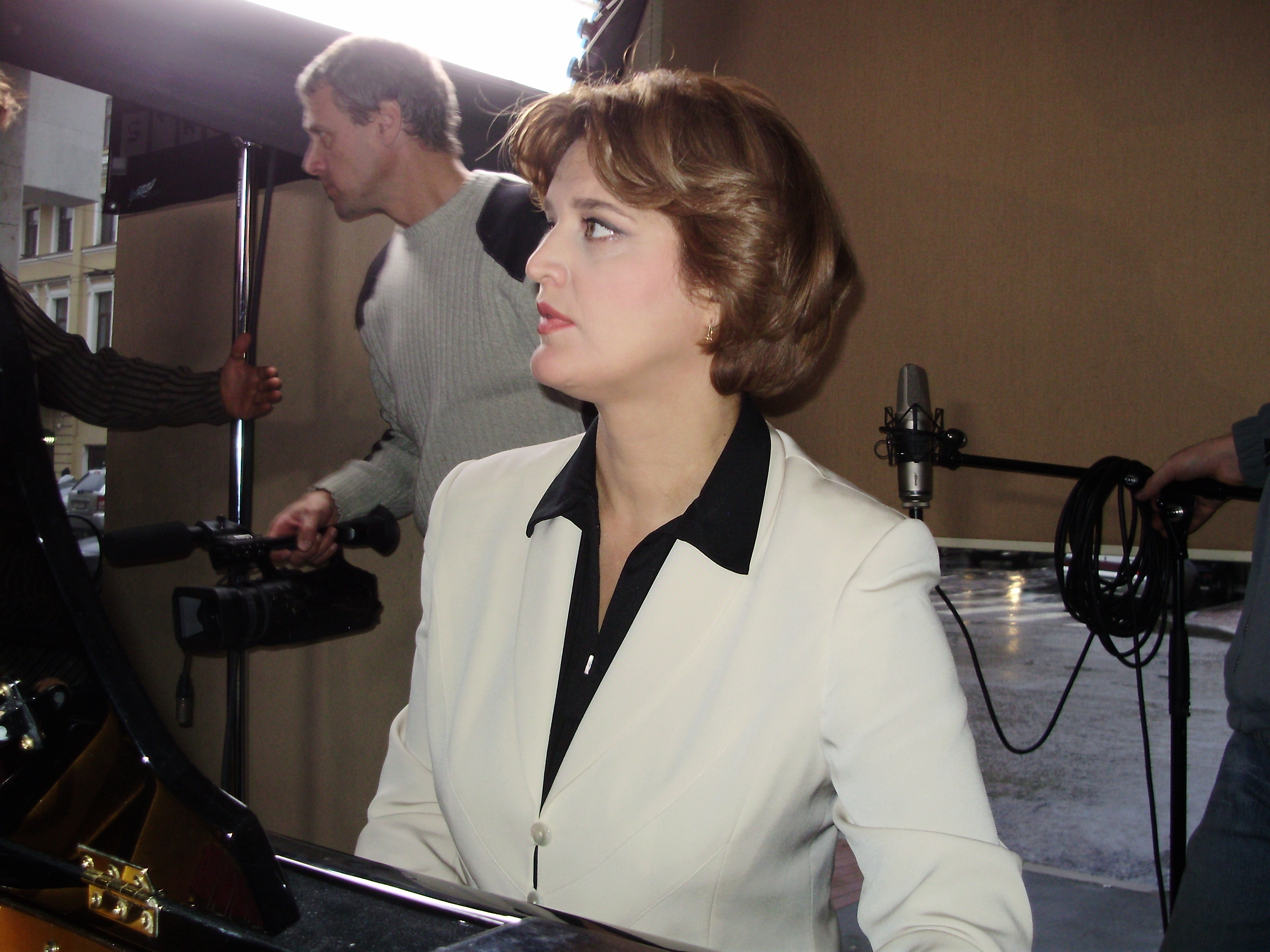
- Marina Starostenkova during shooting of film Ad Libitum

Background information
- Also known as: Marina Starostenkova
- Born: Marina Viktorovna Vasilieva; 28 August 1965 (age 60); Polotsk, Byelorussian SSR
- Genres: Classical music, jazz
- Occupations: Pianist, piano teacher
- Instrument: Piano

Marina Vasilieva Starostenkova Osman (Russian: Марина Васильева Старoстенкова Oсман; born 1965 in Polotsk, Byelorussian SSR, Soviet Union), is a Belarusian classical and jazz concert pianist.

== Biography ==
=== Early life and studies ===
Marina Vasilieva was born in 1965 in Polotsk, Belorussian Soviet Socialist Republic, in a family of musicians.

After moving to Murmansk in the Kola Peninsula, Starostenkova started her music studies in 1980 at Murmansk College of Arts (former Murmank Music School), entering a piano class. In 1984, she graduated with distinction after completing the full academic course in the speciality fortepiano and was given the qualification of teacher of a music school and concertmaster. She entered the Belarusian State Academy of Music in Minsk in the speciality fortepiano in the class of professor Leonid Petrovich Yushkevich in which she stayed until 1990.

=== Career ===
Whilst she studied in Minsk, from 1989, she became a piano teacher and concertmaster in Novopolotsk State Musical College in Novopolotsk.

She was granted the higher pedagogical and concertmaster categories in 1993. She worked from 1989 to 2010 at Novopolotsk State Musical College and prepared 40 students including her daughter, Yulia Starostenkova, to enter the Belarusian State Academy of Music, and at other musical superior institutions and colleges in Russia and Belarus. Yulia Starostenova won 2nd prize at Chopin republican contest in 2005. Some of her students entered the German universities of Hochschule für Musik Karlsruhe and Internationales Musikinstitut Darmstadt. Most of her students were laureates of the music contest for young interpreters of music for the piano, interregional piano contest (Vitebsk), regional contest in Vitebsk (1997), Grodno (2005, 2006), Minsk (2007), Mogilev (2009) and made "a huge historical and creative contribution to development of the college".

N. Kushnarova and Marina Starostenkova were laureate of the republican contest of creative works forming a duet.

She was a member of the jury of the third International Chamber ensemble competition "Nova Musica" in Daugavpils. Starostenkova took part in concerts both in Belarus and Russia, and also in jazz festivals in Germany, Poland, Lithuania and Russia in 2009.

In September of the same year, she was invited to Moscow to participate in radio recordings of Swedish violinist Michael Kazinik's radio programs at radio Orpheus a Russian classical music station, before continuing to give concerts in December 2009 in Moscow with him and Andreï Chistyakov.

This is Marina Starostenkova – an amazing pianist from the far Belarusian city of Novopolotsk. This is the House of Music. That is, all the music that was ever written, all the harmony, all the possibilities exist in her head, heart and hands.

— Michael Kazinik, Вечер импровизации. Встреча первая,

Now in England, Marina Osman frequently gives concerts at the Pushkin House in London and has given piano and theory lessons since 2011. Marina Osman participates in the music band Kara and gives concerts with the band as a pianist.

In 2019, Marina Osman has won the 2019 Folking awards in the "Best musician" category.

== Awards and diplomas ==
Starostenkova has been awarded:

- The lapel badge of the Ministry of Culture of the Republic of Belarus for the contribution to the cultural evolution of Belarus (Certificate n° 648 by the order of the ministry of Culture of the republic of Belarus n° 91 from 12 November 2008)
- The diploma of the Republic of Belarus Ministry of Culture for exquisite concertmaster skills at an international contest for string instruments in Gomel in 2006
- Diploma for exquisite concertmaster skills at the Republic's open contest of folk instruments in Grodno (2009)

== Films ==
In 2008, Starostenkova was invited to Saint Petersburg to shoot the film Ad Libitum with musicologist Michael Kazinik and violinist Andreï Chistyakov.
