= Novopolotsk State Musical College =

Public college in Novopolotsk, Belarus

- Новополоцкий государственный музыкальный колледж
- Other name: NGMU
- Established: 23 July 1968
- Director: Alexander Ivanovich Kondratyuk
- Location: Škoĺnaja vulica 7, Novopolotsk, Vitebsk Region, 211440, Belarus; 55°32′4.885″N 28°38′22.834″E
- Website: www.ngmk.by

Novopolotsk State Musical College is a Belarusian undergraduate music college established in 1968. Several of its graduates have gone on to have national and international musical careers.^{,}

In 1997, the college opened a special department for talented children, providing individual progress for each child. The department often launches fund-raising programmes to continue its financing and development.

The college has eight departments, and subjects include musicology (leading to the qualification of professor), brass and percussion, piano, orchestral string instruments and chamber ensemble, chorus conducting, folk chorus, folk instruments (bayan, accordion) and string folk instruments.

The current director is Alexander Ivanovich Kondratyuk. In its 40 years, it has produced over 2,000 students. Amongst its teachers are Galina Malykh, Marina Starostenkova and Mikhail Ivashkin.

== Notable Graduates ==
- Yulia Starostenkova, piano
- Vladislav Pligovka, accordion
- Tatjana Ivashkina, domra
- Mikhail Ivashkin,
- Arseni Sadykov, piano
