= Beno Axionov =

Soviet and Moldovan actor, director and drama instructor

- Băno Axionov
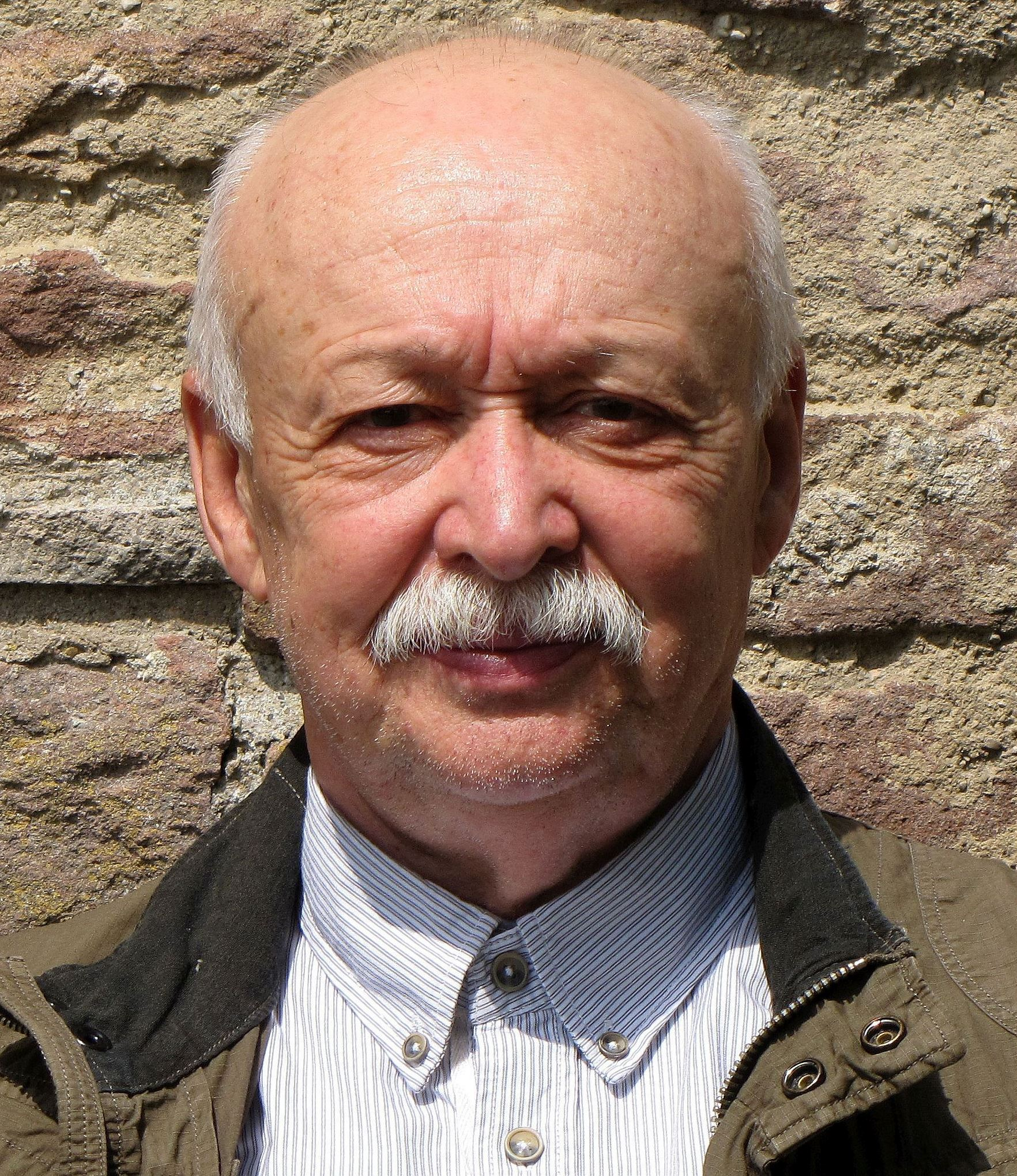
- Axionov in 2014
- Born: 2 April 1946 (age 80); Minsk, Soviet Union
- Occupations: Actor, producer, director, screenwriter, drama teacher
- Awards: Meritorious Artist of Moldova

Beno (Băno) Axionov (Belarusian: Бэна Максавіч Аксёнаў; Russian: Бэно Максович Аксёнов; Romanian: Băno Axionov; German: Bäno Axionov; born 2 April 1946) is a Russian-Moldovan actor, director, drama teacher, screenwriter. Meritorious Artist of Moldova (1991). Laureate of national and international theater festivals.10.

== Biography ==
=== Early life and education ===
Axionov was born in Minsk, to father Max Fishman and mother Lydia Axionova. At age 5 he moved to Kishinyov, now Chișinău, the capital of Moldova. He attended schools No. 3, 5, 41, 4. He began taking part in sports at the age of 14, was by track coach Evgeniy Zybchenko, who recommended he tries hurdling. He became the 1963 - 1966 national champion in the 200-meter hurdles and 400-meter hurdles.

Since 1965 Axionov studied at the Moldova State Institute of Arts and the Leningrad University of Theater, Music and Cinematography with Nadejda Aronețkaia, then continued his studies in Moscow at the Maria Knebel's Laboratory of Directing, in higher director's courses and an internship at the Mossovet Theater with Pavel Chomsky in Moscow.

=== Career ===
From 1969 to 1973 he worked as an actor and director assistant in Tiraspol. From 1973 to 2006 he has worked as an actor and director in the Chekhov Russian State Drama Theatre of Chișinău. From 1969, he director at various theatres, including the Republican Theater Luceafărul, in the Moldovan State Philharmonic, on National TV, in the theater "Actors House", in the Organ Hall, in the theater of the State University of Chisinau, in the People's Theater, in a tiny Theater near Deribasovskaya (Odessa). Many of his productions were the first in Moldova. From 1969 to 2006 simultaneously with working in the theater Axionov appeared regularly on nationally broadcast television in Moldova and was involved in several TV projects about culture, theater, and literature as an actor, and interviewer. He had great success with his show where he was the presenter of the children's TV program "Ugodayka" (Guessing game), in the role of a cheerful, cunning, funny and all-knowing clown "Ugodayka". Axionov has made appearances on a variety of television shows as the host of actual satirical television programs "Arichul" (Hedgehog) and "Arichul's Shop". From 1976 to 2000 he was a regular figure of the TV program "Theater of Miniatures", as an actor and director. Many years directors actively filmed him in commercials. From 1971 to 1985 he was a drama teacher at the Moldovan State Institute of Arts.

His works gained critical and viewers acclaim, however since 1992 Axionov became increasingly uncomfortable with the adoption and adaptation of his ideas and practices, from the Ministry of Culture of the Republic. One after another, unprofessional managers began to be appointed to the Russian State Drama Theater "A.P. Chekhov", who tried to privatize the theatre building, which Axionov was against. They began to forbid him to stage performances, threaten, and as a result, "unknown people" severely beat him. So, at what seemed to be the height of his public profile, he left Moldova and since 2007 he lives in Karlsruhe, Germany.

He has been working as an independent director and theater teacher, he has taught and conducted master classes, and given lectures on the history and culture of Moldova, Romania, Ukraine, Russia, and Belarus. From 2007, he director at various theatres, including in the Badischen Staatstheater Karlsruhe, in the "Uni-Theater" Karlsruhe, in the art association "KABAX", in the "Kellertheater" Germersheim, in the student theater Karlsruhe, in the Theater Group Mannheim, in the Evangelical theater fraternity, in the "Film Studio Germersheim", in the Centrum "De Strandjutter" Blankenberge. Axionov has written plays and staged them as director in Moldova and Germany.

From an article in the book «Băno Axionov Theater» by Vitaliе Rusu, people's artist of Moldova, laureate of the State Prize of the Republic of Moldova

«...As far as I can remember, Băno Axionov has always been uncomfortable... At the same time, in some inscrutable way, he manages to charm: with his performing color, openness, attractiveness, his human and bright creative individuality. Eternal rebel leader. The performances staged by him captivate with temperamental acting, the richness of the director's imagination and the unexpectedness of the techniques...»

=== Selected roles in the theater ===
He has more than 200 stage roles. Among his works: Alexander Ostrovsky «It's a Family Affair-We'll Settle It Ourselves» - (Rispolozhensky's role), Anton Chekhov «The Witch» - (Gykin's role), Eugène Marin Labiche «The Italian Straw Hat» - (Fadinard's role), Molière «The Imaginary Cuckold» - (Sganarelle's role), Anton Chekhov «A Marriage Proposal» - (Lomov's role), Romanian folklore «Făt-Frumos» - (the title role), Richard Brinsley Sheridan «The Duenna» - (Isaac Mendoza's role), Alexander Ostrovsky «Jokers» - (Obroshenov's role), William Saroyan «Hello Out There!» - («A Young Man's role»), Charles Perrault «Puss in Boots» - (the title role), Friedrich Schiller «Mary Stuart» - (Mortimer's role), Molière «Forced Marriage» - (Sganarelle's role), Evgeny Schwartz «Two maples» - (Baba Yaga's role), Aldo Nicolaj «Celestino Viola's career» - (the title role), Charine and Giovanni, musical «A Married Idyll» - (Zanni's role, Mother's role, Taxi Driver's role, Conductor's role, Family Friend's role, Doctor's role, Policeman's role, Sea Captain's role, Dancer's role), Tudor Mușatescu «Titanic Waltz» - (Spirache Necșulescu's role), Anton Chekhov «The Seagull» (Medvedenko's role), Molière «The School for Wives» - (Molière's role and Alain's role), Grigori Gorin «Memorial prayer» – based on the works of Sholom Aleichem - (Menahem-Mendl's role), Albert Camus «Caligula» - (Cherea's role), Alexander Ostrovsky «Bankrupt» - (Rispolozhensky's role).

From an article in the book «Băno Axionov Theater» by Vitalie Țapeș, professor, doctor of Philosophy, people's artist of Moldova:

"Băno Axionov has undoubtedly become one of the brightest and biggest stars of our theatre ... By his disposition, way of existence and self-expression he is both a skomorokh and a comedian, a clown and a tragedian. He is always different, complicated, sometimes uncomfortable and unpredictable, but always bright and very kind ... He created a lot of wonderful characters: comic, tragicomic and tragic ..."

=== Selected productions in the theater ===
He has staged over than 60 performances: «King Matt the First» by Janusz Korczak, «Luise Miller» by Friedrich Schiller, «Ladies and Gentlemen» stories by Anton Chekhov, «Pages from Egmont» by Johann Wolfgang von Goethe and Ludwig van Beethoven, «The Imaginary Cuckold» by Molière, «Hello Out There!» by William Saroyan, «The Robbers» by Friedrich Schiller, «Forced Marriage» by Molière, «The Human Voice» by Jean Cocteau, «Book of Songs» by Heinrich Heine, «Just a heart...» by Marina Tsvetaeva, musical «The Mystery of Mother Elderberry» by Hans Christian Andersen, «Life and Songs» by Rainer Maria Rilke, «Puss in Boots» by Charles Perrault. «Nothing in me will forget about this» by Itzhak Katzenelson, Elie Wiesel, Hannah Szenes, «Stop the Plane - I'll Get Off» by Efraim Sevela, «The Suicide» by Nikolai Erdman, «Love and hatred» by Victor Hugo, «You can't command your heart Die Mitschuldigen» by Johann Wolfgang von Goethe «The Tale of Tsar Saltan» by Alexander Pushkin, «Diary of a Madman» by Nikolai Gogol, «Trouble from a tender heart» by Vladimir Sollogub, «Another Man's Wife and a Husband Under the Bed» by Fyodor Dostoevsky

From an article in the book «Băno Axionov Theater» by Mihai Munteanu, professor, people's artist of the USSR

Băno Axionov is certainly the greatest representative of Russian dramatic art in our country ... The performances, he directed, captivate, charm and make the spectators delve into and see the performance from the inside, feel the significant phenomena of modern life. They agitate both thoughts and feelings, at the same time leaving wonderful sensations of touching the beautiful

=== Selected filmography ===
Beno Axionov participated as an actor in 20 movies:

- 1964: Robin Hood (Tsentrnauchfilm) – Bill.
- 1976: Mark Twain vs... (Moldova-Film) – Crook, saloon regular.
- 1979: And the day will come... (Moldova-Film, 2nd episode) – Journalist.
- 1979: Hello, I have arrived (Moldova-Film) – Engineer.
- 1979: Emissary of the Foreign Center (Moldova-Film) – Agent.
- 1980: Big, Little War (Moldova-Film) – Makhnovist.
- 1993: Train to California (The Favorite, Eolis-film) – Grigenaru.
- 1995: The Lower Depths based on the play by Maxim Gorky (Moldova 1, 6 episodes) – The Tatar.
- 1999: The Return of the Titanic (Cinema space, 2 episodes) – Pavlik.
- 2000: Anthology of Jokes (Moldova Studio) – Electrician.
- 2019: Who Is Next?, according to Anton Chekhov's story "Surgery" (Germersheim Film Studio) – Grandfather.

=== Recognition ===
- In 1984 Băno Axionov was awarded a badge of honor «Excellent Worker of Culture».
- In 1991, he was awarded with the title Honored Artist of the Republic of Moldova.
- In 2006, the book "Theater Beno Axionov" was published in Moldova.

=== Personal life ===
Axionov's first wife was actress, director and teacher Liudmila Hachi. They had a son, Vladislav Aksenov (born July 12, 1976), who is a Doctor of Historical Sciences (2021), a leading researcher at the Institute of Russian History of the Russian Academy of Sciences, and an associate professor who has taught at several Moscow universities (MIREA – Russian Technological University, Moscow State Pedagogical University, Russian Presidential Academy of National Economy and Public Administration, Financial University under the Government of the Russian Federation). His second wife teacher, Doctor habilitatus in Sociology, Doctor of Philosophy, Principal Research Scientist. (Institute of Philosophy, Sociology and Law. Department of Sociology. Academy of Sciences of Republic of Moldova) Svetlana Dmitrenco.

Beno Axionov's younger brother is pianist and teacher Artur Aksenov (b.1956).

== Sources ==
- Михаил Голер: «Энергия чувств» Независимая Молдова 12.28.1978
- Nina Rozhkovskaya, Vadim Rozhkovsky: Theater and Spectator. Biblioteca Naţională a Republicii Moldova, BNRM Literatura artistică Chişinău 1981 Clasificare:792C2 (Нина Рожковская, Вадим Рожковский: Театр и зритель.
- Светлана Соловьёва: «Формула души» Независимая Молдова 05.11.1990
- Михаил Дрейзлер: «Ломая рамки амплуа» Независимая Молдова 03.02.1996
- Михаил Дрейзлер: «Мы идём смотреть Аксёнова!» Независимая Молдова 04.30.1996
- Валентина Склярова: «Человек по имени Бэно» Независимая Молдова 12.21.1996
- Алексей Аглаюн: «Театр Бэно Аксёнова Молдавские ведомости 07.18.1998
- Larisa Shorina: The World Through the Eyes of Theater: history of the State Russian Drama Theater named after A.P. Chekhov. Chișinău F.E.P. "Tipografia Centrală". 2001. ISBN 9975-9634-3-9.
- Mihai Bendas: «Exponent al valorilor perene» Patria 02.27.2001
- Валентина Склярова: Biblioteca Națională a Republicii Moldova Один за всех, против всех: (об актёре Бэно Аксёнове) Молдавские ведомости, - Кишинев : ÎM "Edit Tipar Grup" SRL . - 8 c.. - 2004, 13 марта, С. 6
- Валентина Склярова: «Один – за всех, противу всех...» Молдавские ведомости» 03.20.2004
- Виталий Цапеш: «Парадоксы профессии» Независимая Молдова 10.13.2004
- Jakob Berditsch: Very unusual Chekhov. (Якоб Бердич: «Очень непривычный Чехов») Literaturverein «Edita Gelsen e. V.» S. 9–11, Edita» No.2 2009 ISSN=1617-9013
- Наталья Зорина: «Творческий человек всюду «прорастёт сквозь асфальт» Истоки №5 2011
- Ольга Беженару, Вероника Каждан: «О времени и о судьбе талантливого режиссёра» / «С верой, надеждой и любовью» Teatru №10 2012
- Vladimir Smirnov:Games on the Volcano AVA.MD" February 28, 2014
- Veronica Kazhdan: Overcoming darkness and chaos (Meritorious Artist of Moldova Beno Axionov) Magazine Others Shores No. 3 (39) 2015 pp. 80–87. ISSN 1994-3768
- AVA:Европейская интеграция начинается с культуры. 25.12.2015
- Анатолий Левицкий: «Театральный мир Бэно Аксенова» ПроАртИнфо 03.23.2016
- Victoria Mihai: In search of good and true. Axionovs. Information and analytical portal AVA.MD December 4, 2017.
- Anatoly Levitsky: Film by Beno Axionov (Moldova) Who is next?. Magazine Klauzura 06/17/2019.
- Karina Koval: In a polite surround. Magazine "Others Shores" No. 2 (50) 2019 ISSN 1994-3768.
- Maria Stankevich: Fair games. Past and present of the actor and director Beno Axionov. Magazine Chayka. May 10, 2021.
- Veronica Kazhdan: Beno Axionov: "Who are we friends against"??? or "not remembering their kinship". Information and analytical portal AVA.MD. June 4, 2022.
- Veronika Kazhdan: Inspirationally Overcoming Obstacles: On the 80th Anniversary of the Honored Artist of Moldova Beno Axionov / "Notes on Jewish History" Magazine, No. 1(266) January 2026
- Ion Constantin, Marina Okhrimovskaya: "Freedom as a Profession. The Theatre of Bano Axionov". Switzerland for Everyone magazine, March 18, 2026.]
- Ion Constantin: "Unconquered Master: for the 80th Anniversary of Actor and Director Bano Axionov (Moldova)". Hyperlink from the article "Freedom as a Profession. The Theatre of Bano Axionov", Switzerland for Everyone magazine, March 18, 2026.]
- Oleg Dashevsky: «Băno Axionov: Theater as a Space of Inner Freedom» AVA.md 2026-03-25
- Lib.ru/Modern Literature: Beno Axionov: Plays
