= Angelina Tkatcheva =

Belarusian virtuoso cymbalist

- Ангелина Ткачёва
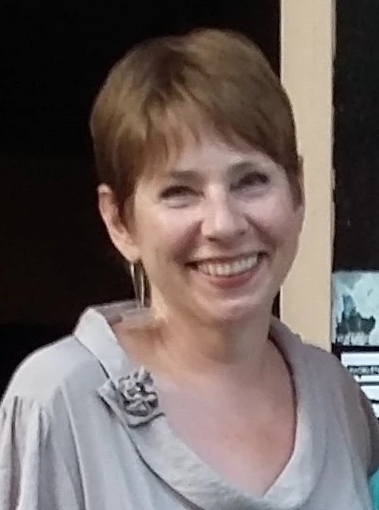
- Born: Minsk
- Education: Belarusian State Academy of Music
- Years active: 1983–present
- Spouse: Aristos Stathopoulos

Angelina Tkatcheva (Belarusian: Ангелина Ткачёва) is a Belarusian virtuoso cymbalist. She is regarded as one of the greatest Belarusian cymbal players of all time.

== Biography ==
She was born in Minsk, Belarus, where she began her musical studies at a very young age. At the age of 10, she received her first prize in the Belarusian competition for young musicians, performing works on cimbel.

After a few years, she continued her studies at the Belarusian State Academy of Music, where she completed her studies in 1983, receiving a diploma. In the same year, she took part in a solo competition of the Soviet Union held in Moscow, in which she received an award. After that, she pursued a career as a soloist, giving concerts and recitals in various cities of the USSR, while at the same time continuing to attend classes at the academy, as part of her postgraduate studies.

Her repertoire includes works by classical, romantic, but also contemporary composers. In 1989 she settled permanently in Greece, which was the occasion to begin a new artistic career, starting collaborations with the Athens Concert Hall, the Greek National Opera, the Athens State Orchestra, the Thessaloniki State Symphony Orchestra, the Orchestra of Colors and the ERT Music Ensembles, while generally collaborating with the Greek Composers' Union. She has also performed at the Odeon of Herodes Atticus and the Pallas Theater, but has also taken part in many music festivals and events.

She has taught at the Athens Conservatoire, the Hellenic Conservatory and the Municipal Conservatories of Patras and Petroupoli. Some of her students are Areti Ketime, Christina Kouki, Penny Georgopoulou and Antonis Fragakis.

== Discography ==
Name	Year published	Album artist	References
ROM	1989	Nikos Kypourgos	
An Imoun Andras	1997	Maria Katinari	
At The Café Aman	1998	Niki Tramba, Ross Daly, Labyrinth	
Proves apoheretismou	1999	Maria Voumvaki	
I Domna Samiou sto Megaro Mousikis	1999	Domna Samiou	
Septemvrios	2001	Nikos Platyrachos	
Tis Kira-Thalassas	2002	Domna Samiou	
Allotes Otan Ekoursevan	2006	George Hatzimichelakis	
Ode	2007	Tassis Christoyannis	
Tragoudia tou Aigaiou	2008	Orchestra of Colors, Savina Yannatou, Vasilis Gisdakis	
24 = 24 Songs	2008	Manos Hadjidakis	
To Hrisafi t' Ouranou	2015	Michalis Loukovikas, Aris Alexandrou	
Modus	2016	George Hatzimichelakis	
Music from Greece: Domna Samiou	2018	Domna Samiou	
Lydian stone	2019	George Hatzimichelakis	
