= The Grey Legend =

The Grey Legend (Седая легенда) is a 1978 Russian-language opera by Dmitry Smolsky based on the Belarusian novel by Uladzimir Karatkievich.

== Recordings ==
- Aria: Hoary Legend "Ti pripomni jak lotaz kalisti u lugah mi zbirali" (Remember how we once plucked marigolds in the meadows) [3:15] Oksana Volkova, Kaunas City Symphony Orchestra, cond. Constantin Orbelian. Delos.
