= Ferman (name) =

Ferman is a German surname and a Turkish given name. The surname is a variation of Fehrmann, meaning "ferryman". The given name is derived from the Turkish word for "edict", borrowed from the Persian Farmaan or Fermaan (Persian: فرمان farmân).

Notable people with the name include:

Surname:

- Daan Ferman (1909–1969), Dutch rower
- Edward L. Ferman (born 1937), American writer and publisher
- Grunia Movschovitch Ferman (1916–2004), Polish resistance fighter, nurse, businesswoman, and Holocaust remembrance activist
- James Ferman (1930–2002), American film and theatre director
- Joseph W. Ferman (1906–1974), Lithuanian-American science fiction publisher
- Polly Ferman (born 1944), Uruguayan pianist, classical musician, music director and producer
- Risa Vetri Ferman (born 1965), American lawyer

Given name:

- Ferman Akgül (born 1979), Turkish songwriter
- Fermán Cienfuegos (born 1947), Salvadoran communist
- Farman Salmanov (1931–2007), Soviet geologist
