= Lyudmila Karpawna Shleh =

Belarusian composer (born 1948)

Lyudmila Karpawna Shleh (born 21 September 1948) is a Belarusian composer. She was born in Baranovichi and studied with Mikalay Il'ich Aladaw and Dmitry Smolsky at the Conservatory of Belarus, graduating in 1972. She joined the Belarusian Composers’ Union in 1974 and continued her education with Sergey Slonimsky while teaching at the Leningrad Conservatory. After completing her studies in 1980, she has worked as a full-time composer.

== Works ==
Karpawna's compositions are influenced by the folk music of Belarus and by liturgical music. Selected works include:

- Tarakanischche (The Cockroach) (after K. Chukovsky), 1972
- Lubok, choral suite, 1974
- Trava-murava, cantata, 1979
- Requiem ‘Pamyatayse’ (Remember) choral (after A. Adamovich)
- Kolesnik: Ya z vognennay vyoski (I am from the Fiery Village), speaker, chorus, solo vv, orchestra, 1982
- Igrïshchï (Games), vocal-symphony picture, 2 solo vv, chorus, orchestra, 1983
- Skarbonka minulaga (Sadness for the Past) (cantata, T. Bondar), 1987
- Blagoslovi, dusha moya (Praise the Lord, my Soul), 1991
- Skaz pra Igara (A Tale about Igor) (oratorio, Ya. Kupala: Slovu o polku Igoreve), speaker, organ, chorus, organ, 1991
- 12 pesnopeniy o belorusskikh svyatïkh (12 Chants about Belarusian Saints), 1994
- Nestserka, symphonic poem, 1971
- Yarmarochnïye zarisovki (Fairground Sketches), orchestral suite, 1979
- Yuraw dzen (Yury’s Day), fairy-concerto for orchestra
