= Saint Lazarus cemetery =

Cemetery in Chișinău, Moldova

Coordinates: 47.0689°N 28.8233°E

Saint Lazarus cemetery (Romanian: Cimitirul „Sfântul Lazăr”) is a large cemetery in Chișinău in Moldova. It is 2,000,000 square metres in area, and has over 300,000 graves.

== Prominent personalities buried at the Saint Lazarus Cemetery ==
- Ungureanu Petru – director at the "Moldova-film" cinema studio.
- Ciuș Arcadie – cinematographer at the "Moldova-film" studio.
- Max Fishman – composer, pianist, and music teacher.
- Vitaly Levinzon – Meritorious Artist of the MSSR, (Russian Drama Theater "A. P. Chekhov" in Chișinău).
- Loghinov Valeriu – composer, music editor, educator.
- Nicolae Chiosa – Meritorious Artist of the MSSR, composer, music editor, and music teacher.
- Aleksandr Sokovnin – pianist, university professor, Meritorious Artist of Art of the MSSR.
- Nelli Kameneva – People's Artist of the Moldavian SSR (Russian Drama Theater "A. P. Chekhov" in Chișinău).
- Mihail Milikov – Meritorious Artist of the MSSR, (Russian Drama Theater "A. P. Chekhov" in Chișinău).
- Serghei Savcenko – footballer of the Soviet Union national team.
- Serghei Pojar – musicologist, music critic, journalist, culturologist, composer, educator.
- Gheorghe Tegleațov – football player and coach of Ukrainian-Moldovan and Soviet football.
- Victor Bucătaru – director.
- Boris Cebotari – football player.
- Lydia Axionova – choir master, university professor, Meritorious Artist of the MSSR.
- Mihai Timofti – was a Moldovan theatre and film director, actor, multi-instrumentalist musician, professor, screenwriter, writer and composer. Held an honorary title of "Master of Arts".
