= Zinaida Mozheiko =

Belurisan ethnomusicologist and cinematographer

Zinaida Yakovlevna Mozheiko (Belarusian: Зінаіда Якаўлеўна Мажэйка; 6 December 1933 – 8 March 2014) was a Belarusian ethnomusicologist and cinematographer. Considered the founder of Belarusian ethnomusicology, she mainly focused her research on the folklore of Belarusian songs.

== Biography ==
Mozheiko was born on 6 December 1933 in Orsha, Belarus. She attended Belarusian State University, and graduated from their Department of Journalism—part of their Philological Faculty—in 1952. She began working at a music school in Minsk in 1954, which she continued until 1958. She graduated from the Minsk Music College in 1956, and later worked there as a teacher between 1958 and 1962.

In 1961, she graduated from the Belarusian Academy of Music in Minsk, where she studied as a part of their department of history and theory.

Beginning in 1962, Mozheiko worked as a researcher for 50 years at the Institute of Art History, Ethnography and Folklore at the National Academy of Sciences of Belarus. She first worked there until 1963, then attended the institute for her post-graduate studies until 1966. From 1966 to 2011, she continued to work at the institute, becoming a senior researcher for the academy in 1971.

She recorded folksongs, and released two collections of folk music in 1986 and 1990. She used field recordings to create multiple documentaries about folk music, and released her work under the film studio "Belarusfilm" (Беларусьфільм).

Mozheiko died in Minsk on 8 March 2014, at the age of 81.

== Writing ==
=== Monographs ===
- Song culture of the Belarusian Palessia (Belarusian: Песенная культура беларускага Палесся) (1971)
- Songs of the Belarusian Paazerya (Belarusian: Песні беларускага Паазер'я) (1981)
- Songs of the Belarusian Palessia (Belarusian: Песні беларускага Палесся) (1985)
- Calendar-song culture of Belarus: experience of systematic and typological research (Belarusian: Каляндарна-песенная культура Беларусі: вопыт сістэмна-тыпалагічнага даследвання) (1985)

=== Books ===
- Belarusian Ethnomusicology: Essays on History (XIX-XX centuries) (Belarusian: Беларуская этнамузыкалогія: Нарысы гісторыі (ХІХ-ХХ ст.ст.)) (1997) - contributor and editor

== Films ==
- Poleskie Christmas (Belarusian: Палескія калядкі) (1972)
- Voice of the Ages (Belarusian: Голоса веков) (1979)
- Memory of the Centuries (Belarusian: Память столетий) (1982)
- Polesskie Svadby (Belarusian: Полесские свадьбы) (1986)
- Carry the Cloud, God Пранясі, божа, хмару) (1990)
- Crooked Evenings Крывыя вечары) (1993)
- Movement of the Earth Рух зямлі) (1999)

== Awards and honors ==
- 1987 - Honored Artist of the Byelorussian SSR
- 1994 - State Prize of the Republic of Belarus
