= Fellman =

Fellman is a surname and may refer to:

- David Fellman (1907–2003), American legal scholar
- Isaac R. Fellman, American archivist and writer
- Michael Fellman (1943–2012), American and Canadian historian, educator
- Nina Fellman (born 1964), Finnish and Ålandic journalist, and politician
- Richard Fellman (born 1935), American politician from Nebraska
- Sandi Fellman (born 1952), American photographer
