= Fährmann =

Fährmann (German pronunciation: [ˈfɛːɐ̯man]) or Faehrmann (meaning "ferryman") is a German surname. Notable people with the surname include:

- Cate Faehrmann, Australian politician
- Christian Fährmann (born 1975), German footballer
- Hans Fährmann (1860–1940), German composer and organist
- Ralf Fährmann (born 1988), German footballer

== See also ==
- Fehrman
