= Belarusian State Academy of Music =

Public university in Minsk, Belarus

Coordinates: 53°54′10″N 27°33′28″E

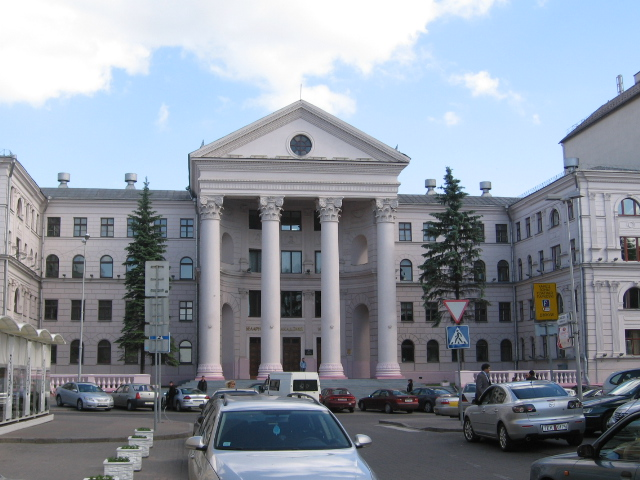
Minsk Conservatory

The Belarusian State Academy of Music (Беларуская дзяржаўная акадэмія музыкі) is the primary music and higher education institution and research center of musicology, folklore, aesthetics, music pedagogy in Belarus, based in Minsk.

Minsk had earlier had a conservatory, Minsk Conservatory. It was founded in 1932 and up to 1992 was known as the Belarusian State Conservatory. In 2000 the Belarusian Academy of Music was granted status as the leading institution of the national system of education in the field of musical art, alongside the Belarusian State Academy of Arts.

== Rectors ==
- M. Kazakov (1932-1933)
- J. Pris (1933-1934)
- Konstantin Bogushevich (1934-1936)
- Oscar Gantman (1937-1938)
- Mikhail Berger (1938-1941)
- Nikolai Aladov (1944-1948)
- Anatoly Bogatyrev (1948-1962)
- Vladimir Olovnikov (1962-1982)
- Igor Luchenok (1982-1985)
- Mikhail Kozinets (1985-2005)
- Alexander Rashchupkin (2005-2010)
- Ekaterina Dulova (2010-2022)
- Elena Kurakina (2022-present)

== Notable alumni ==
- Mieczysław Weinberg - taught and studied composition 1939-41
- Anatoly Bogatyrev - composer, founder of the modern Belarusian school of composition, a professor of the Belarusian State Music Academy, People's Artist of Belarus
- Eta Tyrmand, composer and music teacher
- Max Fishman - pianist, composer and music teacher
- Angelina Tkatcheva - virtuoso cimbalom player
- Igor Luchenok - composer, People's Artist of the USSR
- Zinaida Mozheiko - ethnomusicologist, field researcher of Belarusian folk music
- Dmitry Smolski - composer, guitarist and composer, father of Victor Smolski
- Maria Kalesnikava - Music teacher, political activist
- Vyacheslav Kuznetsov - Belarusian composer
- Yadviga Poplavskaya - singer, member of the group "Verasy"
- Michael Kazinik - violinist
- Marina Starostenkova - pianist, concertmaster and music teacher

== Notable teachers ==
- Anatoly Bogatyrev - the founder of the modern Belarusian school of composition, composer, educator, social activist, Distinguished Artist of the Byelorussian SSR (1940), winner of the State Prize (1941), Honored Artist of the Byelorussian SSR (1944)
- Eta Tyrmand, composer and music teacher
- Vladimir Perlin - cellist, Professor, Honored Artist of the Republuc of Belarus
- Leonid Petrovich Yushkevich - Professor, pianist, piano teacher
