= Vladimir Ivanovich Zakharov =

Vladimir Ivanovich Zakharov (born 18 October 1961 in Grodno) is a Belarusian guitarist, composer and music teacher. In 1981 he graduated from the Grodno School of Music and in 1991 from the Belarusian State Conservatory. In 1992 he received a Diploma at the VII International Guitar Competition in Kraków and in 1993 won the VII International Guitar Competition in Gdańsk. He has participated in numerous festivals in Russia, Ukraine, Belarus, Poland and Spain. His guitar works are included in the current curriculum for Belarusian music schools. He is also the author of numerous transcriptions and arrangements of guitar, piano, choral and vocal pieces. He was awarded the Medal of the Ministry of Culture of the Republic of Belarus for his contribution to Belarusian culture (1999), prize of the Grodno City Executive Committee "For his creative achievements and personal contribution to the cultural development of the city" (2001). Currently he teaches guitar at the Grodno State College of Music, a branch of the Belarusian State Academy of Music, and at the Hrodna State University.
