= Lola Folman =

Polish Jewish singer and composer

- Born: 1912
- Died: 1979 (aged 66–67)
- Occupations: Singer, composer
- Spouse: Yitskhok Perlov

Lola Folman (1912–1979) was a Polish Jewish singer and composer popular in Poland in the 1930s.

Folman was a folk singer. She was often accompanied by pianist-improviser Max Fishman, was soloist with the Moshe Shneur Choir in Warsaw and later a composer and performer in kleynkunst and revi-teater. Folman married lyricist Yitskhok Perlov, who wrote the words to her famous Dos Baytshl Kreln.

Folman was also an actress and singer with the very successful traveling Melokhishe Yidishe Miniatur-Teater, created in Bialistock in 1939 by Shimon Dzigan and Israel Shumacher, directed by Moishe Broderzon, with music director Shuel Berezovski and actors Vladislav Godik (Willy Godnick), Yule Bregman, Shmuel Goldshteyn, Khile Shiper, Mina Bern, Yehude Berg, Hele Luksenburg, Shimon Osovitski, Mark Moravski, Mordkhe Rotsheyn, Felix Fibikh, Ber Shvartshtein, and Moyshe Nudelman. The troupe played in Odessa, until it was evacuated to Kharkov and later Asia. After playing for a short time in Ashkhabad, the troupe disbanded.

"Then Lola Folman, a woman of about thirty, slightly plump, dressed in short trousers fashioned, apparently, from an old floral dress and an open, sleeveless shirt - the finest of feminine fashion on the ship - climbed to the top of the companionway ladder. It was hard to guess, from her appearance, why she had gone up there, but when she opened her mouth and began to sing in a lovely clear strong voice, folk-songs from a world no longer extant, a shudder ran through the audience. ... Lola Folman sang a new song, Exodus, which excited all of us and was cheered to the echo. The words were written by her husband Yitzhak Perlov."

Folman gave performances in the Bergen-Belsen displaced persons camp in 1948. She emigrated to New York and was buried in the Jewish cemetery in Queens, NY in 1979.

== See also ==
- Mikhal Veychert: Zikhroynes, Volume II, 1961
- Manger, Turkov, Perenson: Yidisher Teater in Eyrope p. 124
