= Eta Tyrmand =

Belarusian composer

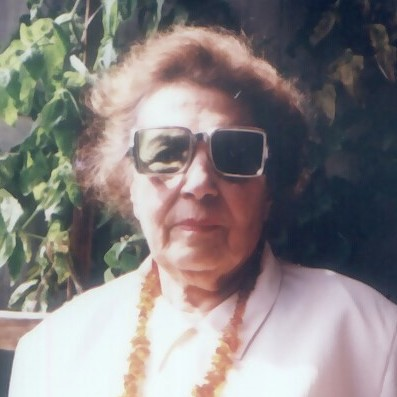
Eta Moiseyevna Tyrmand in 2000

Eta Moiseyevna Tyrmand (Belarusian: Эта Майсееўна Ты́рманд, romanized: Eta Majsiejeŭna Tyrmand; Russian: Эта Моисеевна Тырманд; February 23, 1917 – April 29, 2008) was a Belarusian composer.

== Life and career ==
Eta Tyrmand was born in Warsaw. She graduated from the Warsaw Conservatory in choral performance in 1938, and from the Belarusian State Conservatory in classical piano and composition in 1952. She located in Minsk in 1939, and during World War II lived in Frunze. She taught for nearly 40 years at the Belarusian State Conservatory where she trained several generations of highly accomplished musicians.

== Works ==
As a composer, Tyrmand worked mainly in chamber and choral music. She composed piano sonatas, works for violin and viola, instrumental miniatures, choral pieces and song cycles with text by Maksim Bahdanovič (1891-1917), Federico García Lorca (1898-1936) and others. Selected works include:

- Five Preludes (1948)
- Variations (1950)
- Variations on a Belarusian Folk Theme (1951)
- Piano Concerto No. 1 (1952)
- “Scenes from the Lives of Children” Suite (1953)
- Sonatina (1954)
- Piano Concerto No. 2 (1956)
- Pioneer Suite No. 1 (1962)
- Toccata (1962)
- Suite No. 2 (1963)
- Etudes-Tableaux in two books (1971–72)
- “Four Moods” Suite No. 3 (1973)
- Suite No. 4 (1975)
