= Faehlmann =

Faehlmann is an Estonian surname of German origin that may refer to

- Andreas Faehlmann (1898–1943), Estonian, aviation engineer and yachtsman
- Friedrich Robert Faehlmann (1798–1850), Estonian philologist and physician
- Georg Faehlmann (1895–1975), Estonian, Imperial Russian Navy officer, master mariner and yachtsman, brother of Andreas
