= Ron Folman =

Israeli physicist and activist (born 1963)

- רון פולמן
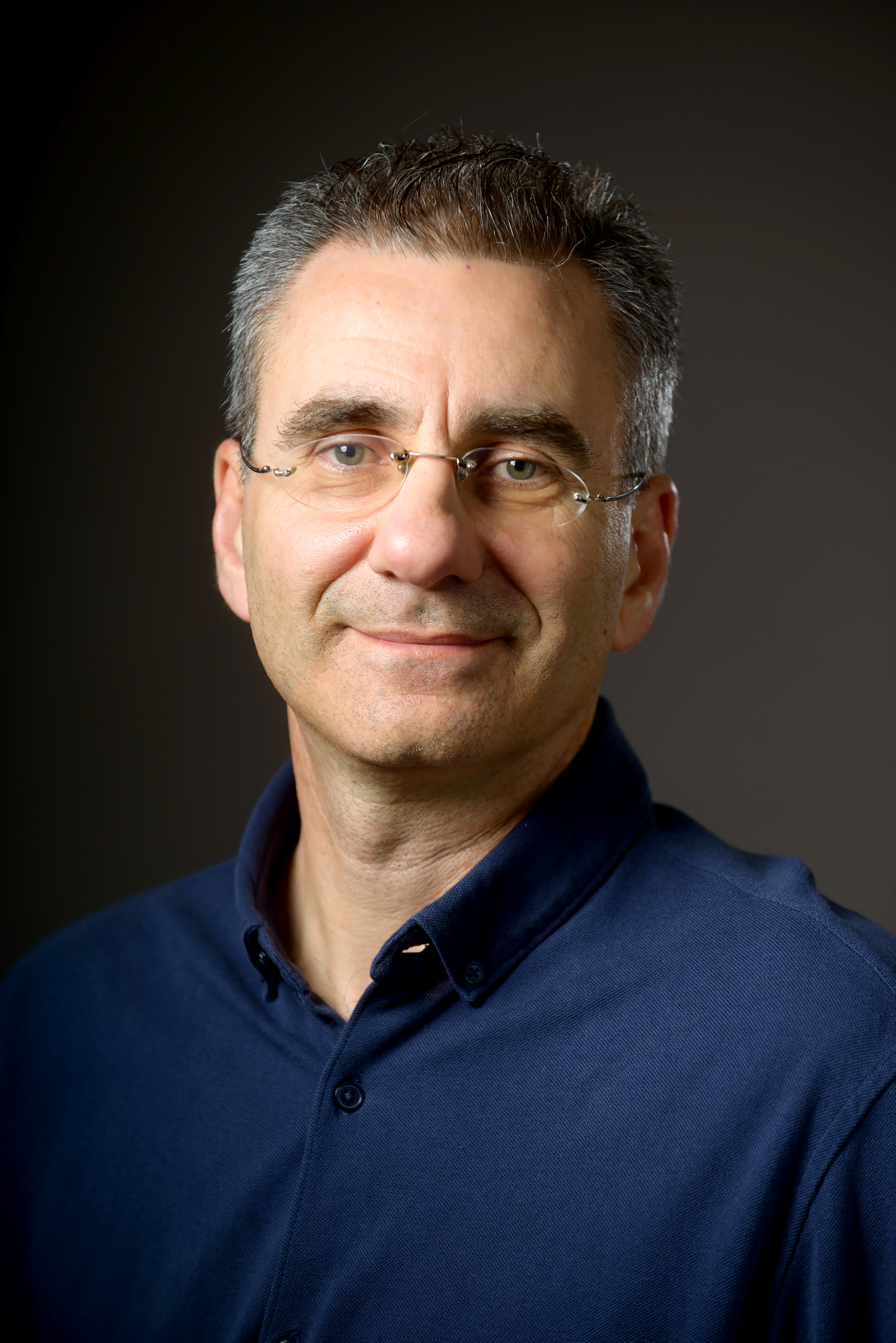
- Born: Ron Folman; 16 February 1963 (age 63); Tel Aviv, Israel
- Children: 5

Ron Folman (Hebrew: רון פולמן; born 16 February 1963), is an Israeli quantum physicist and social activist. He works at the Ben-Gurion University of the Negev (BGU) where he heads the Atom Chip group. He is the author of the book The Human Test.

== Biography ==
Folman, born in Tel Aviv, is the son of Russian born Ahuva (Luba) Gordon and Polish born Yeshayahu Folman. Folman's mother, who barely escaped with her family from the burning city of Minsk as the Nazi army advanced, tried to make it to the land of Israel on the famous Exodus refugee ship, only to be returned by the British to Germany.

In 1998, Folman received his PhD degree from the Weizmann Institute of Science (work conducted at CERN). Between 2000 and 2003, he worked as a researcher at the University of Heidelberg (Marie Curie fellow), Germany, and before that in 1999-2000 as a postdoctoral fellow in Innsbruck. He is an advocate of Human Rights, Animal Rights, Social justice, Peace and Environmental sustainability.

Folman's father is a survivor of Auschwitz where he was numbered B-1367. Folman tattooed an exact replica on his arm.

== Activism ==
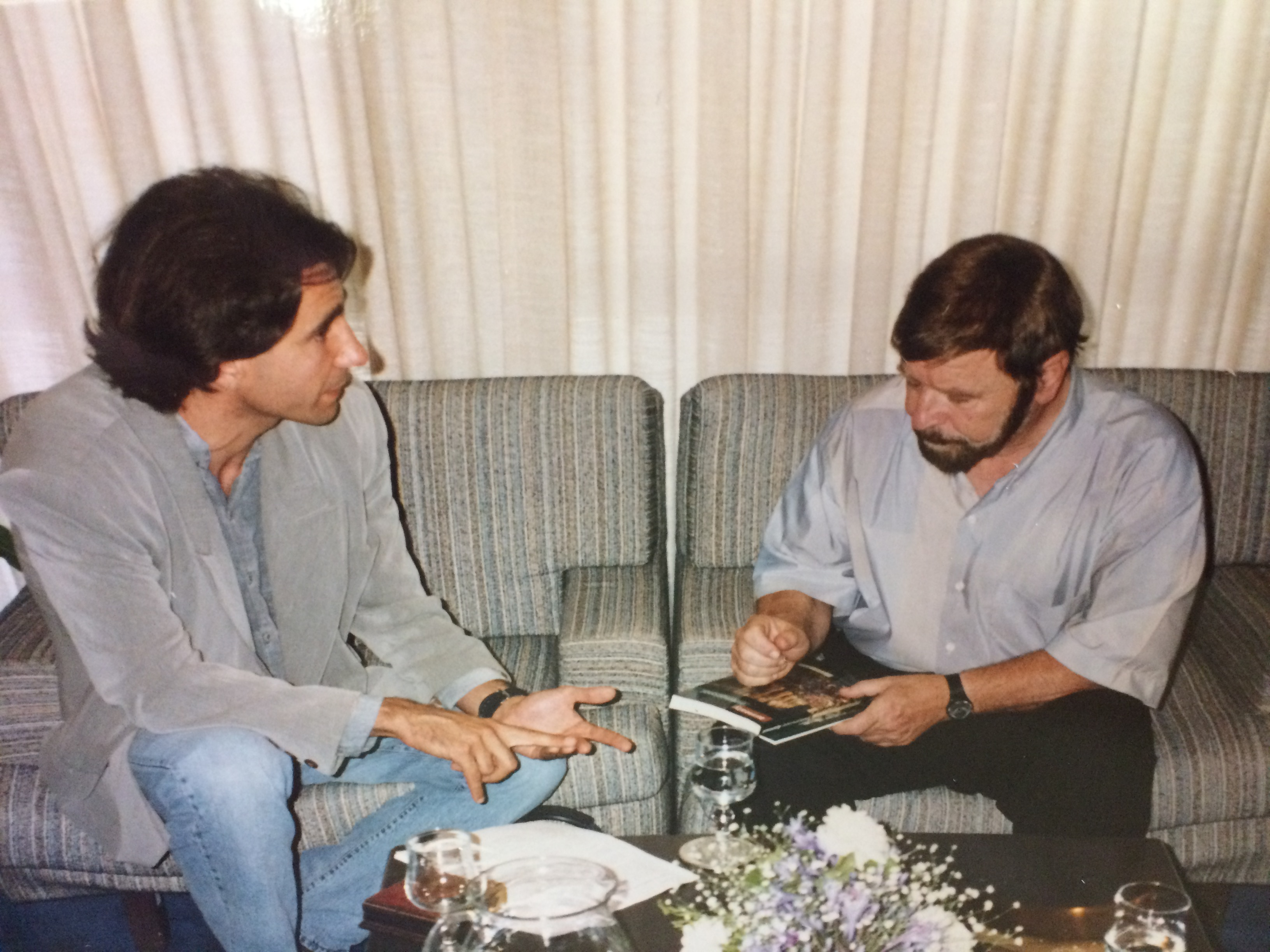
Ron Folman, Chairperson of Amnesty International, Israel Section, is presenting the Amnesty International annual report on Human Rights, to Shevah Weiss, Speaker of the Knesset (Israeli Parliament), Jerusalem, June 1994

- Human Rights: Folman has been a member of Amnesty International (AI) and in the 90s he was the chairperson of the Israeli Section of the organization.
- Environmental Sustainability: Folman has been an active member of Greenpeace
- Social Justice: Folman was a member of the board of the university center for the promotion of education and careers among the Bedouins of the Negev desert.

== Science ==
Folman is a professor of quantum physics at Ben-Gurion University of the Negev (BGU) where he heads the Atom Chip group. He was the founder and first director of the BGU center for quantum science and technology since 2010, and the founder and first director of the center for nano-fabrication since 2003. Folman is one of the inventors of the Atom Chip. and is credited as realizing the first complete Stern-Gerlach interferometer. Folman is active in probing the interface between the general theory of relativity (gravity) and quantum mechanics. Folman is also involved in the search for new physics such as searches for Dark Matter. In 2011, he received the Willis Lamb award and in 2013, he was a Miller visiting professor at Berkeley.

In 2021, Folman received the Falling Walls award for physics, and in 2023 was one of 11 worldwide to receive an award for an experiment that could transform our understanding of the universe.
