= Polly Ferman =

Classical piano and tango musician from Uruguay

- Born: October 21, 1944 (age 82); Montevideo, Uruguay.
- Occupations: Pianist; music director; educator
- Years active: 1947–present
- Website: pollyferman.net

Polly Ferman (born October 21, 1944, Montevideo, Uruguay) is an Uruguayan pianist, classical musician, music director and producer.

She has performed as a solo pianist since 1947 and recorded more than 15 albums. Ferman is known for her repertoire of Latin American and classical music including artists Piazzola, Villa-Lobos, Albéniz, Binelli, Chabrier, Gottschalk, Joplin, and Nazareth. Ferman has toured globally, performing at international venues including New York's Lincoln Center and Carnegie Hall, the Buenos Aires Teatro Colon, Tokyo's Takemitsu Hall, Beijing's National Centre for the Performing Arts, Lebanon's Pierre Aboukhater Theater, and Shanghai's Oriental Art Center. Ferman has performed with prestigious orchestras including the Tokyo Philharmonic, San Francisco Symphony, Argentine National Symphonies, Hong Kong Philharmonic Orchestra, São Paulo State Symphony Orchestra, and others.

The non-profit Pan American Musical Art Research (PAMAR) was founded and directed by Ferman in 1984 to promote culture and music of Latin American countries. She also created and founded the annual Latin American Cultural Week (LACW) in New York City which celebrates Latin American artists.

Ferman created and directed the all-female tango show, GlamourTango. The show celebrates women's role in shaping tango and features an all-female cast.

In 2023 she was featured in the New York State Capital Hispanic Heritage Month Exhibit.

She lives in Valencia, Spain with her husband Daniel Binelli.

== Discography ==
- Piano Music by Ernesto Nazareth, PAMAR/Sadaic, 1987
- Waltzes of the Americas (Valses de los Américas), SADAIC-AADI-CAPIF, 1990
- Habaneras, Milongas, Tangos, PAMAR/Sadaic, 1994
- Ernesto Lecuona - Danzas Cubanas, SABAM/TALENT, 1995
- Argentine Piano Music, Polly Ferman, Polly Ferman/PAMAR, 1997
- Música para piano de Ariel Ramírez, PAMAR/SADAIC, 2000
- Imágenes (with Daniel Binelli), EPSA Music, 2001
- Orquestango I (with Daniel Binelli & the Montevideo Philharmonic), SONDOR, 2003
- Orquestango II (with Daniel Binelli & the Montevideo Philharmonic), SONDOR, 2004
- Polly Ferman's GlamourTango (Tango in Feminine Form), Sedaic, 2004
- New Tango Vision, Raices, 2006
- Tango Fado Project, Sorel Classics, 2015
- Tango in The Night (with Daniel Binelli, German Guitierrez, Leanne Nicholls and Hong Kong Chamber Orchestra), ORCHID CLASSICS, 2021

== See also ==
- Classical music
- Tango music
