= Eugen Coca =

Moldovan violinist and composer (1893–1954)

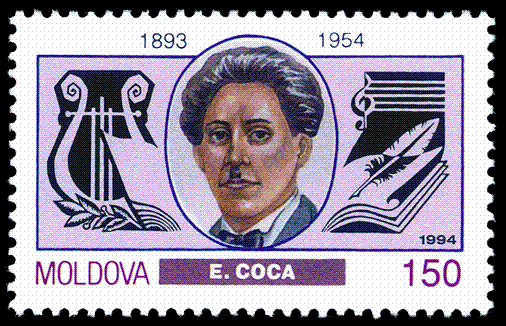

Eugen Coca (15 April 1893 – 9 January 1954) was a Moldovan violinist and composer.

His works ranged from adaptations of folk songs and scores for film and theatre to compositions of symphonic, instrumental, chamber and choral music. He produced two symphonies and two symphonic poems, the most well known of which was the opera "Firebird" (Pasarea Măiastră), based on a popular legend.

There was a ten-year music school that took its name, which was later divided into two musical high schools: "Ciprian Porumbescu" high school and "Serghei Rahmaninov" high school.

== Biography ==
Coca, violinist, conductor and composer, was born on 3 April 1893 (old style) in Cureșnița, Soroca District. From the early childhood, he was taught to play violin with his father, Costache Coca, a well-known musician (lăutar) from Soroca.

He became a violinist in the orchestra of the Drama Theater and in the folk music orchestra led by A. Poleacov (Chișinău, 1905–1908), while studying the violin with T. Grama and I. Finkel.

He was then a violinist in the Symphonic Orchestra of Eupatoria (1912–1913), in the orchestra of the Sibiriakov Opera Theater in Kostroma (1913–1914) and S. Zimin in Moscow (1914–1915).

From 1915 to 1917, he studied the violin under the guidance of professors Tall in Moscow and Malishevski in Odessa. He was a violist in the George Enescu Orchestra in Iași (1919–1925). He took the lessons of violin from I. Finkel (1924–1926) and of composition form Gheorghi Iaţentkovski (1932) at Unirea Conservatoire in Chișinău.

Coca was a professor of harmony, theory and composition and conductor at the Music School in Cetatea Albă; a violinist at the Bucharest Radio Orchestra (1934–1940); a conductor of the Symphony Orchestra of the Philharmonic in Chișinău (1944) and of the Radio Orchestra in Chișinău (1944).

Member of the Romanian Composers Society (1935); member of the Union of the Composers of the Republic of Moldova, the branch of the Union of the Composers of the USSR (1940). He was awarded with the second honorable mention for the symphonic painting (1936) and with the first honorable mention for the Romanian Capricious (1937) and with the Award for the "George Enescu" composition. He had pupils like B. Podgurschi (violinist). He collaborated with: I. Dailis, N. Cerenesa, T. Iaţkovski, J. Bobescu, G. Enescu, L. Feldman, V. Jianu, Gh. Manole, C. Ţurcan, A. Theodorescu, N. Propişcean, V. Boz, M. Duda, P. Bacinin, etc.
