= Igor Luchenok =

Belarusian composer (1938–2018)

- Игорь Лученок
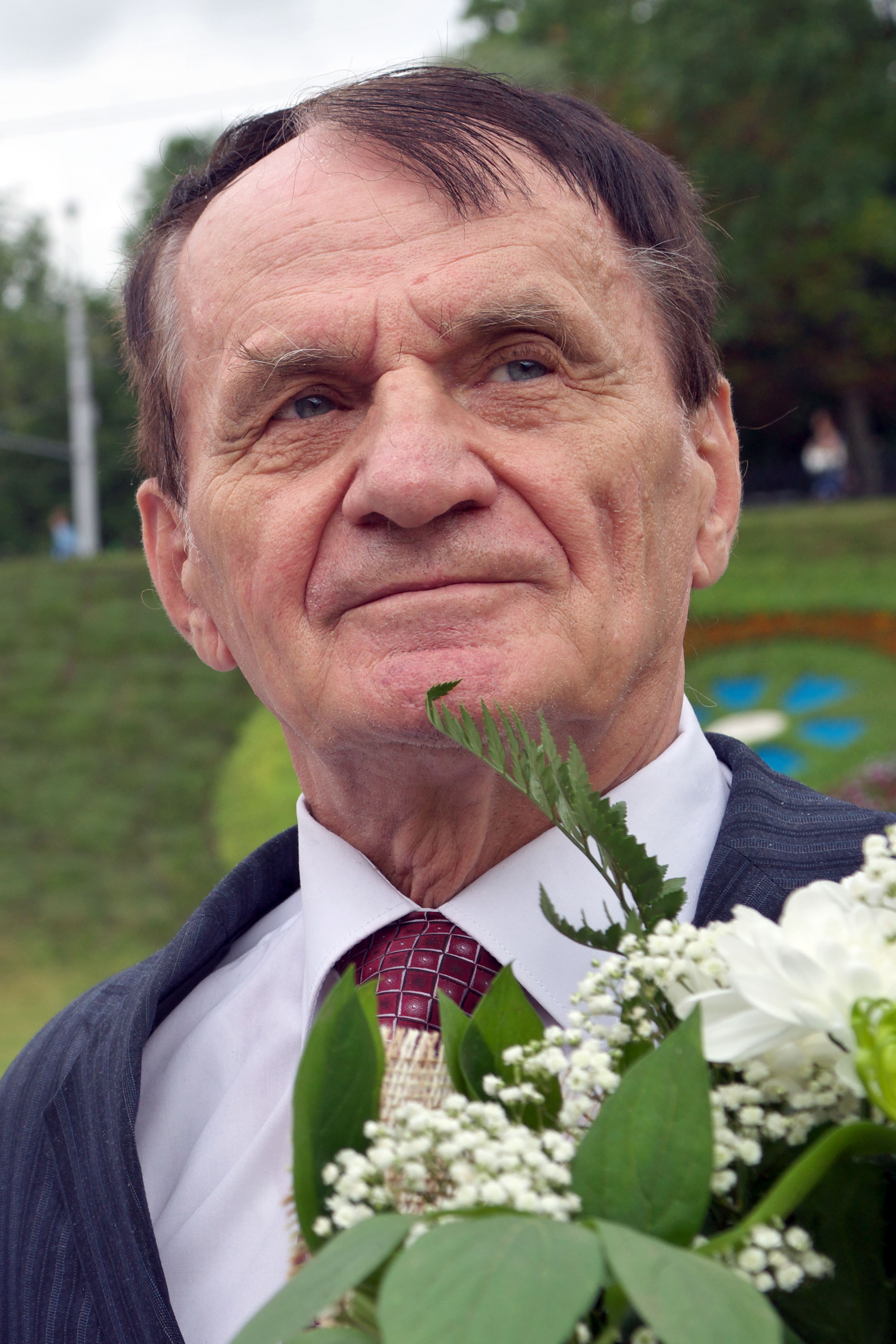
- Luchenok in 2010
- Born: August 6, 1938; Minsk, Belarus
- Died: November 12, 2018 (aged 80); Minsk, Belarus
- Occupation: Composer

Igor Mikhailovich Luchenok (Belarusian: Iгар Міхайлавіч Лучанок, Ihar Michajlavič Lučanok, Russian: Игорь Михайлович Лученок; 6 August 1938 — 12 November 2018) was a Belarusian composer, People's Artist of the Byelorussian SSR (and People's Artist of the USSR), and chairman of the Belarusian Union of Composers.

== Biography ==
Luchenok worked in various genres — vocal-symphonic, chamber-instrumental, chamber-vocal, but most fruitfully — in song. From his works formed the repertoire of Pesniary, Syabry, Verasy, Joseph Kobzon, Sofia Rotaru, Valentina Tolkunova, Maria Pakhomenko, Lev Leshchenko, Victor Vuyachich, Eduard Khil and many others.
