= Dmitry Smolsky =

Belarusian composer

Dmitry Smolski
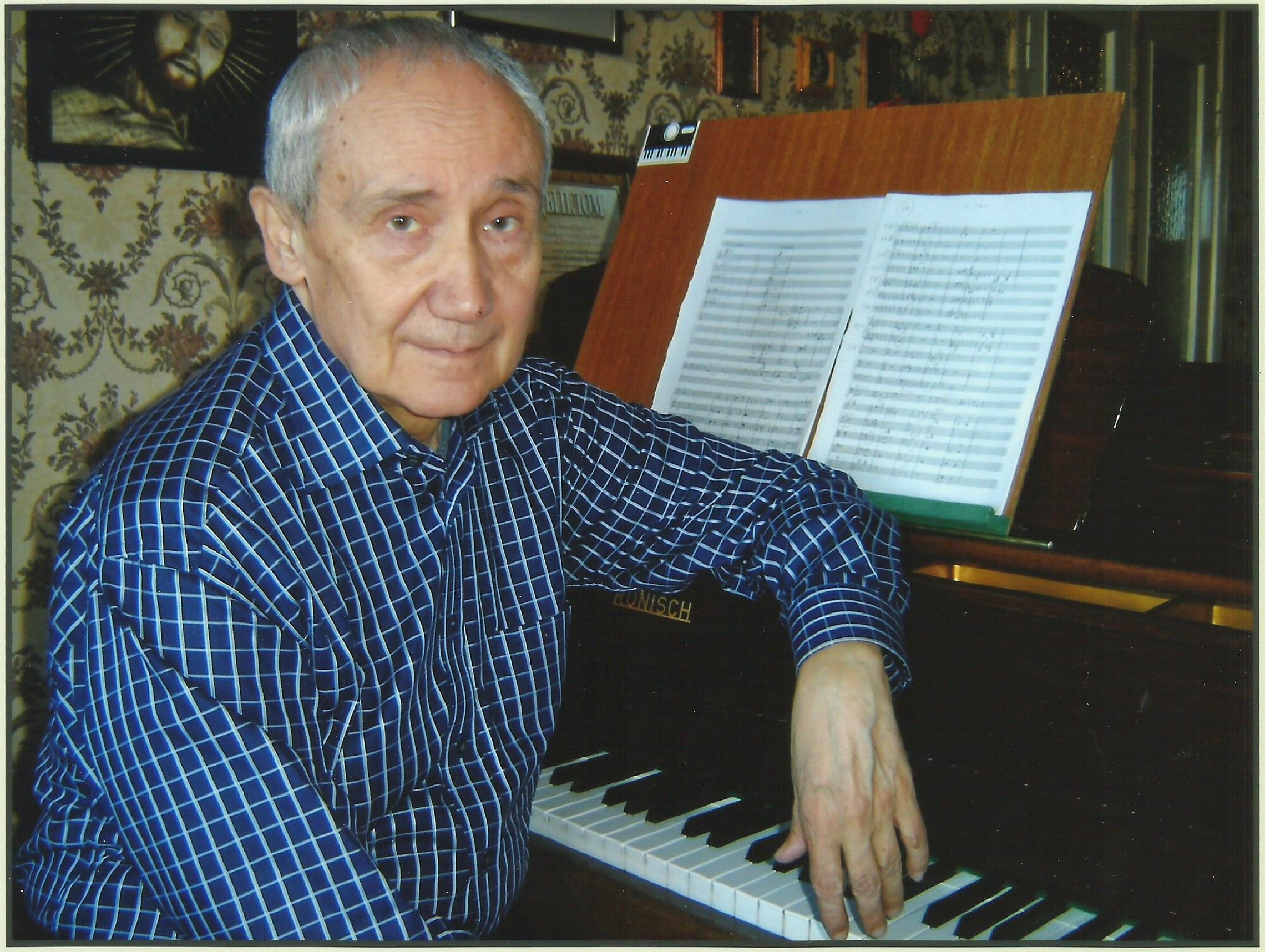
- Smolsky in 2016

Background information
- Born: July 25, 1937; Minsk, Soviet Union
- Died: September 29, 2017 (aged 80)
- Genres: Stage works, symphonic works, orchestral works, instrumental concerts, instrumental chamber music, vocal music, pop songs, choral works, music for theater performances, music for films
- Occupations: Composer, Professor, Honored Artist of Belorussian SSR (1975), laureate of the State Prize of BSSR (1980), National Artist of the Republic of Belarus (1987), laureate of the Order of Francysk Skaryna (2013)
- Years active: 1949–2017

Dmitry Smolski (July 25, 1937 – September 29, 2017) was a Belarusian composer, Honored Artist of Belorussian SSR (1975), laureate of the State Prize of BSSR (1980), National Artist of the Republic of Belarus (1987), laureate of the Order of Francysk Skaryna (2013), and professor. Dmitry Smolsky was the father of Victor Smolski, best known as the guitarist of the German band Rage.

== Early life ==
Dmitry Smolski was born on July 25, 1937, in Minsk in the family of a famous Belarusian musicologist Bronislaw Smolski. A musical environment surrounded him from early childhood contributed to an early demonstration of his musical talent (the first musical publication of the young composer refers to the age of 12). At the age of seven, Dmitry began regular music lessons (violin), first in the Moscow Central Music School and then at the Music School of Belarusian State Conservatory, where he also started to learn composition under the leadership of a famous Belarusian composer Evgeniy Tikotski. In 1955, Smolski entered the Moscow Conservatory to the class of prof. Yuri Shaporin, but a year later he had to return to Minsk for health reasons. D. Smolski graduated from the Belarusian State Conservatory, where he studied in the composition class of prof. A. Bogatyrev (1960), followed by post-graduate studies in Moscow Conservatory under the guidance of prof. Nikolay Peyko (1967).

== Career ==
From 1962 till 2014 D. Smolski taught composition at the Belarusian State Academy of Music.

The main facts of the biography of Dmitry Smolski were illustrated in the Belarusian film "10 Revelations of Dmitry Smolski" (author T. Dubkova).

== Creative path ==
The creative path of Dmitry Smolski began in the late 1950s. He is one of the composers' who created trends in the Belarusian music of the late 1960s – early 1970s and demonstrated a new attitude to the art of composing. Mastery in modern composing techniques (D. Smolski had a lively interest in European avant-garde of the 1960s) became the basis of a form of perfection in all his works. The author's nature of composing allows listeners and connoisseurs to talk about "Smolski’s tone".

Dmitry Smolski was not afraid to enter into a confrontation with the generally accepted semi-official style prevailing in the Belarusian art at that time. He created the original symphony "Oktofoniya" (1967) and chamber oratorio "Song of Hiroshima" on the poems by Japanese poets (1965). Both artworks were written in the serial technique. In those years Smolski often used elements of avant-garde style in his chamber music. His works included elements of humor (Concertino for violin, Variations for wind instruments and percussion). In the later works, this gentle humor turned into sarcasm with elements of tragic farce (Variations with the Belarusian mentality, 15th Symphony, parts of other symphonies, etc.).

The main theme of Smolski’s works has always been philosophical understanding of human life and destiny in a totalitarian society, the depth of psychological state of the person in dramatic situations. Each of his 15 symphonies reflects dramatic, tragic or sarcastic aspects of the complex individual experiences in the interaction with aggression or indifference of the world.

Dmitry Smolski not only created his majestic symphonies but also enriched Belarusian musical history with his operas "Hoary Legend" (based on the novel by V. Karatkevich) and "Francis Skaryna"; monumental oratorios "My Motherland" (based on poems of Belarusian poets) and "Poet" (based on the work and life of famous Belarusian poet Yanka Kupala); instrumental concerts (for piano, violin, cello, cymbals); chamber instrumental and vocal compositions. Smolski’s music was played in many countries (Germany, France, Italy, Russia, South Korea, USA, etc.). The CD with the recordings of his symphonies released by the British "Olympia" was the best on the CD Contest in the USA in 1992.

Dmitry Smolski was also a teacher. He worked in the Belarusian State Conservatory (now the Belarusian State Academy of Music) more than a half of the century. During that time he has taught several generations of famous composers, winners of national awards, and associated professors.

Dmitry Smolsky died on September 29, 2017.

== Awards and ranks ==
- Belarusian Lenin Komsomol Prize (1972)
- Honored Artist of Belarus (1975)
- State Prize of the Republic of Belarus (1980)
- Professor (1986)
- National Artist of the Republic of Belarus (1987)
- Special Prize of the President of the Republic of Belarus (2003)
- Cup "Pride of the Nation" (2012)
- Order of Francysk Skaryna (2013)

== Works ==
Stage works:

Operas: "Hoary Legend" («Седая легенда» 1978); "Francis Skaryna" («Франциск Скорина» 1988); concert opera "Apalon-zakanadautsa" based on Vardotsky’s opera («Апалон-заканадаўца» 1991).

Symphonic works:

Symphony №1 (1962), Oktofoniya (1967), Symphony №2 (1982), №3 with solo piano (1985), №4 with solo violin (1986), №5 for chamber orchestra (1987), №6 (1989), №7 (1990), №8 based on poems by Joseph Brodsky (1992); №9 with solo electric guitar (1994); №10 "Ten revelations" with solo viola (1996); №11 (2003); №12 (2005); №13 (2007); №14 (2010); №15 (2014).

Orchestral works:

Festive Overture (1963), music for stringed instruments, 2 pipes, accordion and orchestra (1965), poem "Belarus" (1968), Symphonic Picture (1974); Aria for chamber orchestra (1978), "Symon Musician" for violin, violin ensemble and chamber orchestra (1982).

Instrumental concerts:

For piano and orchestra №1 (1960), №2 (1975), Concertino for violin (1972), for cello (1973); for cymbals and folk orchestra №1 (1961), №2 (1974), №3 (1983), Concerto for piano №2 (1996).

For dance orchestra:

"Basso-ostinato" based on the Belarusian folk song "Chamu zh mnie nia piec’?"

Instrumental chamber music:

For piano: Sonata №1 (1956), №2 (1959), Waltz (1964), Suite "Game of Light" (1964), three preludes and fugues (1982). For flute and piano: variations on the basso ostinato (1963), Sonata (1965). For horn and piano: Scherzo, impromptu (1980). For violin and piano: “Elegy and Toccata in memory of Dmitri Shostakovich" (1975), "Chant", “Dance” (1977). Variations for wind instruments and percussion (1971), Elegy and Rondo for viola and piano (1973), three pieces for cymbals and piano (1973), Rondo for cello and piano (1979), two pieces for solo cymbals (1981), String quartet (1983), "To the Question of Understanding" for flute and bassoon (1989).

Vocal music:

Vocal cycles: "Girls’ lyrical” based on lyrics by A. Astreyko (1959), "Spanish triptych" on the poems by Federico García Lorca (1971), vocal cycle on the poems by Fyodor Tyutchev (1976), "Five lyrical intermezzos" on the poems by G. Heyne (1978), Triptych for voice, violin and piano on the poems by E. Pashkevich, "Three monologues" on the poems by Y. Polonski (1978), the vocal cycle on lyrics by A. Voznesensky (1979), the vocal cycle on the poems by Marina Tsvetaeva (1980), the vocal cycle on the poems by Anna Akhmatova (1980), the vocal cycle on the poems by Boris Pasternak (1983).

Pop Songs: More than thirty.

Choral works:

"The Partisan Triptych" on the poems by M. Tank (1971). "Pietrus" (1979), "My Motherland” on the poems by N. Gіlevіch (1979).

Music for theater performances:

"Konstantin Zaslonov" (1967), "The Tablet Under The Tongue" (1972), "The Thief" (1973).

Music for films: "Rechitskaya lyrical" (1966), "Peter Kupriyanov and others", "The Legend about Minsk" (1967), "There was a war" (1972), "Feedback" (1973), "Wolf Pack" (1975).
