= Gavriil Musicescu =

Romanian composer, conductor and musicologist

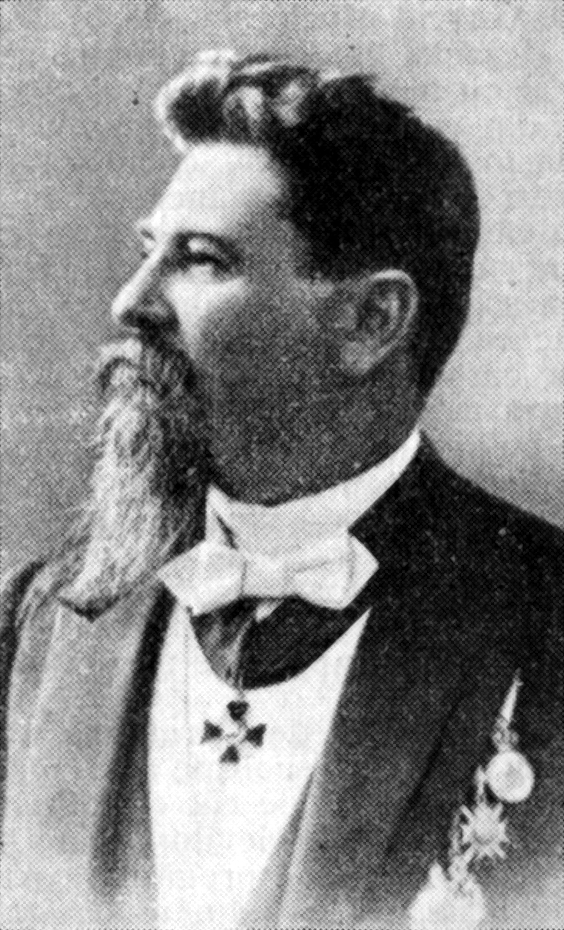
- Born: March 20, 1847; Izmail, Bessarabia Governorate
- Died: December 21, 1903 (aged 56); Iași, Romania
- Education: Saint Petersburg Conservatory; Iași Music School

Gavriil Musicescu (20 March 1847 – 21 December 1903) was a Romanian composer, conductor and musicologist, father of the pianist and musical pedagogue Florica Musicescu.

Born in Budjak region, southern Bessarabia, he studied music and composition in Saint Petersburg and Iași. He is the author of numerous compositions of choral music. Musicescu settled in Romania and, from 1872 until his death in 1903, taught at the Iași Conservatory.

== Gallery ==
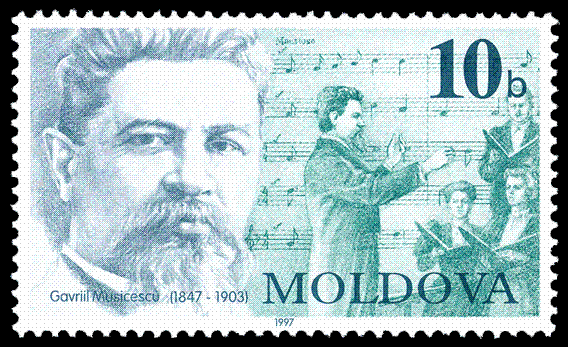
