= Anatoly Bogatyrev =

Soviet-Belarusian composer

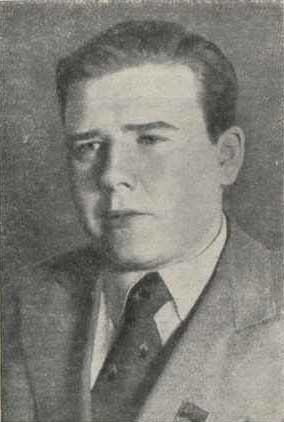
Anatol Bahatyroŭ. Анатоль Багатыроў (1940)

Anatoly Vasilyevich Bogatyrev (Belarusian: Анатоль Васільевіч Багатыроў, Russian: Анатолий Васильевич Богатырё́в; 13 August [O.S. 31 July] 1913 – 19 September 2003) was a Soviet and Belarusian composer and music teacher, seen as one of the leaders of the national school of Belarusian music.

== Biography ==
Bogatyrev was born in Vitebsk Russian Empire, the son of a language teacher. He studied at the Vitebsk Music School, the Minsk School of Music, and the Conservatory of Belarus where he was taught composition by Vasily Zolotarev, a pupil of Rimsky-Korsakov. He came to prominence while still in his twenties, being appointed chairman of the board of the Belarusian Union of Composers in 1938, and receiving the Stalin Prize in 1941. In 1948 he began teaching composition at the National Conservatory, Minsk, where he later became a deputy director. He joined the CPSU in 1954, and was made a People's Artist of the Byelorussian Soviet Socialist Republic in 1968. Bogatyrev died on 19 September 2003 in Minsk.

== Music ==
Bogatyrev's music is tonal with marked nationalist tendencies. His study of Belarusian folklore strongly influenced his music, not just in his folksong arrangements, but also in his choice sometimes to adopt modes and the rhythms of Belarusian folk music. He has been described as "one of the founders and leading representatives of the Belarusian school…Whether vocal or instrumental, his works are arresting for the richness of their melodies and for their polyphonic textures."

== Selected works ==
=== Stage ===
- In the Forests of Polesie, opera (28 August 1939, Minsk). After Yakub Kolas' "The Swamp".
- Incidental music to Romashov's The Undimmed Stars (1941).
- Nadezhda Durova, opera (22 December 1956, Minsk).
- Incidental music to Lermontov's Masquerade.

=== Vocal and choral ===
- Poem on the Tale of a Bear, for solo voices, chorus, and orchestra (1937). After Pushkin's "Tale of the Female Bear".
- The People of Leningrad, cantata (1941).
- To the Belarusian Partisans, cantata (1943).
- Belarus, cantata (1949).
- Belarusian Songs, cantata (1967). Words: traditional and by Nil Hilevich.

=== Orchestral ===
- Symphony no. 1 (1946).
- Symphony no. 2 (1947).
- Concerto for Cello (1962).
- Concerto for Double Bass (1964).

=== Chamber music ===
- Trio for violin, cello and piano (1935).
- String Quartet (1941).
- Variations and Suite on Byron's Manfred, for piano.
- Cello Sonata (published 1971).
