= Hongya =

Hongya may refer to:

- Hongya Cave, tourist shopping centre, Chongqing, China
- Hongya County, county in Sichuan, China
- Hongya Village, or Taktser, Tibetan village in Amdo, Tibet, now known as Qinghai, China
