= Zhao Fusan =

Chinese scholar of Christianity

- Born: 1926; Shanghai, China
- Died: 2015 (aged 88–89); Connecticut, U.S.
- Other name: 赵复三 (Chinese-language name)

Academic work
- School or tradition: Chinese Academy of the Social Sciences
- Main interests: Christianity
- Notable works: The History of Christianity in China

Zhao Fusan (赵复三) (1926–2015) was a Chinese scholar of Christianity. From the 1950s to the 1980s, he was involved in the Three-Self Patriotic Movement (TSPM), but lived in exile after 1989. Together with Zhao Puchu and Zhao Zichen (better known in English as T. C. Chao), they are known as "Three Zhaos" in the academic field of religious studies in mainland China. He died in Connecticut, U.S. on 15 July 2015.

== Life ==
Born in Shanghai in 1926, he received his BA from St. John's University in 1946.

Zhao worked for YMCA in Beijing starting in 1947 and was one of the 40 initiators of Three-Self Declaration in 1950. He then became an Anglican priest of Holy Catholic Church of China, the vice president of Beijing Three-Self Patriotic Movement and the deputy secretary-general of the Beijing Municipal Committee of the Political Consultative Conference. He worked at Institute of World Religions, the Chinese Academy of Social Sciences and eventually became vice president of the academy and TSPM in 1980. He was elected as a Standing Committee member of the Seventh National People's Congress in 1988.

During the late 1980s, Zhao was a vice-president of the Chinese Academy of Social Sciences, from which he was removed after his response to the Tiananmen Massacre. Since leaving China after the Tiananmen Square Massacre of 1989, Zhao resided in Europe and the US and was a visiting scholar at Oklahoma City University (1990–1999). He married Chen Xiaoqiang during the exile and died in Connecticut, U.S. on 15 July 2015.

Among his publications are the Chinese edition of A Short History of Chinese Philosophy published in 2004, translated and updated for the original version of Feng Youlan published in 1948, and The History of Christianity in China (1979, published in Chinese), published under the pseudonym of Yang Zhen.

== Family ==
- Ex-wife: Qu Xixian

== See also ==
- List of Chinese writers
- List of historians
