= Yu Suxian =

Yu Suxian 于苏贤 (Yú Sūxián)
- Born: July 15, 1931; Harbin, Heilongjiang, China
- Died: November 9, 2020 (aged 89) Beijing, China
- Genres: Classical, Polyphonic
- Occupations: Composer, music theorist, educator
- Years active: 1953–2020

Yu Suxian (Chinese: 于苏贤 / pinyin: Yú Sūxián; also romanised as Yu Su-Xian; July 15, 1931 – November 9, 2020) was a Chinese composer, music theorist, and educator, widely recognized for her research and teaching in counterpoint and polyphonic music, and her introduction of the methodology of Schenkerian analysis to China. She was a professor at the Central Conservatory of Music and a pioneering figure in the study of polyphonic music in China.

== Early life and education ==
Yu Suxian was born in Harbin, Heilongjiang, China, in 1931. After the outbreak of the Second Sino-Japanese War in 1937, her family moved back to her ancestral home in Guocheng Town, Haiyang, Shandong Province. In 1948, she joined the Shandong Provincial Federation of Literary and Art Circles’ People's Art Troupe.

In 1950, Yu enrolled in the Department of Arts at East China University (later merged into East China Arts College) and graduated in 1953, remaining at the university as a teacher. In 1955, she entered the composition program at the Central Conservatory of Music, studying under instructors including Liu Liewu, Duan Pingtai, Xu Yongsan, Chen Peixun, Sheng Lihong, Wang Zhenya, and Su Xia. She graduated in 1960 and continued teaching at the conservatory, focusing on counterpoint, music theory, composition theory, and music education. She later served as the head of the Polyphony Teaching and Research Office of the Composition Department.

== Career and Contributions ==
Yu Suxian was a pioneering scholar in the study of counterpoint and polyphonic music in China. She dedicated her career to both theoretical research and practical composition, bridging Western compositional techniques with Chinese musical traditions. Her work is considered foundational for modern polyphonic studies in Chinese music education.

=== Research and Theory ===
Yu's research focused on the analysis, teaching, and systematization of polyphonic music, particularly in both Western and Chinese traditions.

==== Schenkerian Analysis ====
She was among the first Chinese scholars to introduce the methodology of Schenkerian analysis to China and adapt Schenkerian analysis to Chinese music, publishing the very first Chinese-language Schenkerian article in 1987, and a book on Introduction to Schenkerian Analytical Concepts in 1993.

==== Counterpoint and Polyphony ====
Yu's main field of expertise lies in counterpoint, especially the integration of Bach-style western contrapuntal techniques with Chinese-style pentatonic sounding music. Her textbook Polyphonic Music Course (2001) became a standard reference in Chinese conservatories, offering instruction on contrapuntal techniques and musical structure. In Polyphonic Music of the 20th Century (2001), she analyzed contemporary developments in atonal, serial, and non-traditional polyphony, introducing concepts such as non-sequential atonal polyphonic structures. Her 2006 work, Traditional Chinese Polyphonic Music, systematically explored polyphonic elements in Chinese folk and classical music.

=== Teaching and Influence ===
As a professor at the Central Conservatory of Music, Yu trained multiple generations of composers, theorists, and educators. She served as head of the Polyphony Teaching and Research Office, developing curricula emphasizing both technical training and creative application. Yu's teaching philosophy combined strict methodological discipline with encouragement for stylistic experimentation, integrating traditional Chinese musical aesthetics with Western counterpoint principles.

=== Composition ===
Yu Suxian was also an accomplished composer. Her compositions often blend Western polyphonic techniques with Chinese melodic and rhythmic elements, creating works that are both structurally sophisticated and culturally expressive. Notable compositions include:

- Song of Youth – a symphonic poem reflecting modern Chinese themes
- Sword Dance – a dance drama combining traditional narrative with orchestral polyphony
- Earth Overture – an orchestral work awarded at national symphonic competitions
- 24 Piano Fugues and Their Compositional Analysis (2013) – a complete cycle of fugues in all major and minor keys, integrating classical contrapuntal methods with Chinese motifs.

Through her compositions and research, Yu Suxian strengthened the integration of Chinese music with international polyphonic practices, leaving a lasting impact on music scholarship and education.

== Death ==
Yu Suxian passed away on November 9, 2020, in Beijing at the age of 89.
