= Tsering Dolma =

Tibetan politician (1919–1964)

- ཚེ་རིང་སྒྲོལ་མ
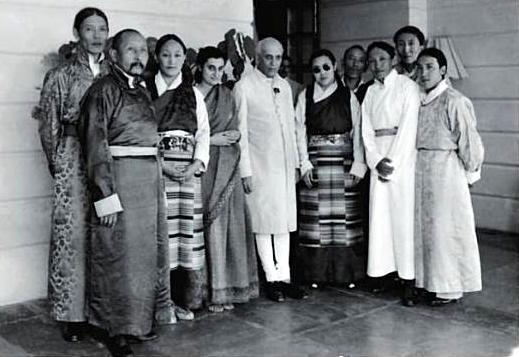
- Tsering Dolma, right of center, as part of the Tibetan delegation that met Indian Prime Minister Nehru in New Delhi in 1950

Member of the National People's Assembly
- In office 1954 – March 1959

Personal details
- Born: c. 1919; Taktser, Amdo, Tibet
- Died: November 21, 1964 (aged 44–45); United Kingdom
- Spouse: Taklha Puntsok Tashi (1937-her death)

Tsering Dolma (Tibetan: ཚེ་རིང་སྒྲོལ་མ, 1919 – 21 November 1964) was the founder of the non-profit refugee organisation Tibetan Children's Villages and was the older sister of the 14th Dalai Lama, Tenzing Gyatso.

== Biography ==
Tsering Dolma was the eldest daughter of a farming and horse trading family living in the hamlet of Taktser. She was the eldest sister of the 14th Dalai Lama, and acted as a midwife to her mother during his birth in 1935 when she was 16 years old.

She married Taklha Puntsok Tashi, a Tibetan politician in 1937 and they moved to Lhasa in 1940. She was part of the 1950 Tibetan delegation to India who met with Jawaharlal Nehru, and she also formed part of a 1954 delegation to Beijing to meet with Mao Zedong and the National People's Congress.

She fled Tibet to India in response to the 1959 Tibetan uprising alongside her brother and other prominent Tibetans with the support of the Central Intelligence Agency's Special Activities Center.

In exile, she established Tibetan Children's Villages who assisted in the building and running of refugee camps for children in Dharamshala. There, she also worked with international volunteers from Service Civil International.

Tsering Dolma died in England in 1964.
