= Ethnician =

- Origin: France
- Genres: Drum and Bass; Dub; World Music; Big beat
- Years active: 1998–present
- Labels: Sony Music
- Members: Miguel Saboga (vocals, drums & percussion, keyboards); Garbis Baharian (sound & treatments); Yvo Abadi (drums & percussion)
- Past members: Igor Nitinksky; Herve Bouffartigues (keyboards)

Ethnician is the band formed by Yvo Abadi (Percussion/Drums), Miguel Saboga (vocals and Percussion), Igor Nikitinsky, Garbis Baharian (Samplers) of Dirty District. their music falls into the category of World Music, Dub and Drum and Bass but also goes into Metal, Reggae and Dance styles also. Discovered by the Printemps de Bourges Festival Network, Revelation of the Pop-Komm 98 according to the German press, the band choose to record their first album in an abandoned movie theater located in the African district of Paris. the name Ethnician was chosen basically because each is from a different ethnic background: Miguel was born in Portugal, Igor was born in Russia, Garbis is from Armenia and Yvo is from Egypt. Recently the band has apparently split and Miguel and Yvo are currently in another Ethnician type band, the heavy percussion-based BOX OHM Station

== Discography ==
- Self Titled (1999)
1. USS (Universal Sound System)
2. Moussaï
3. Growing Seeds
4. Dynamite #3
5. Medicine Man
6. Think Positiv
7. A Test
8. Dub#2
9. Complaint
10. Welcome To Fantasy Island
11. Dynamite
12. Ate Pode Aleijar

they also appear on Tibet Libre (with a calloboration with a monk named Lama Urgyen Dorje, who provides chants for the song) an album based on the International Tibet Independence Movement campaign, Remixes Stereo Stress with come with us (you better!) and French Dub Connection with extended version of USS.

== Websites ==
- http://www.myspace.com/ethnician
- http://www.myspace.com/ethnician2
