= Tanghe County =

Tanghe County 唐河县 Tangho
- County
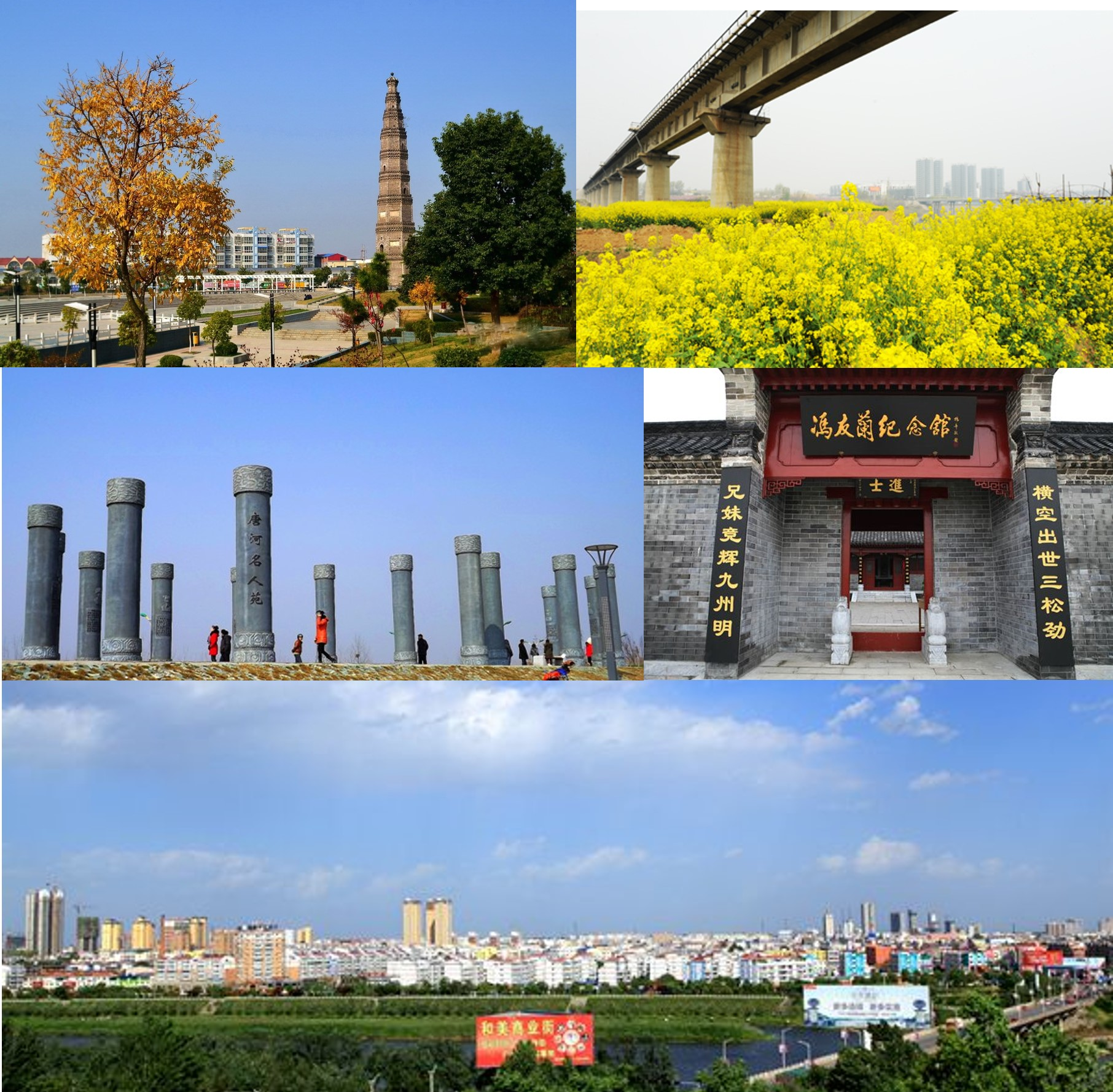
- From top to bottom, left to right: Wenfeng Pagoda (文峰塔), Nanjing–Xi'an railway viaduct, Park of famous persons from Tanghe, Feng Youlan Memorial Hall, view of the county seat

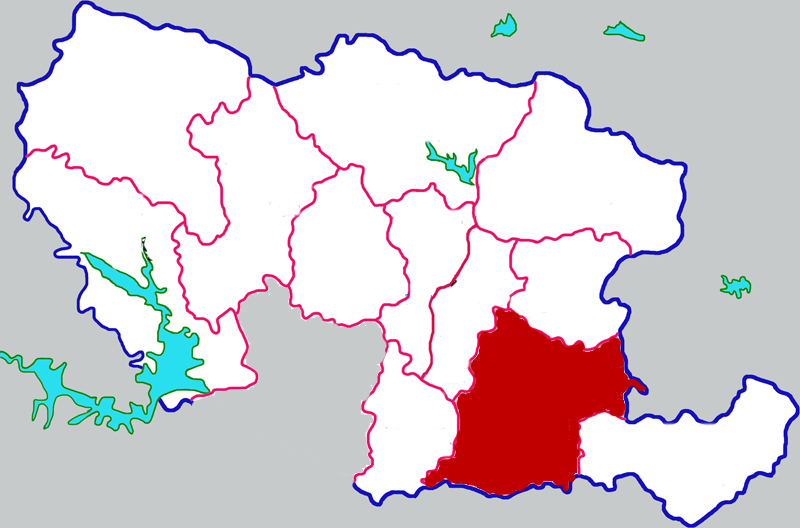
- Tanghe in Nanyang. Note the map does not include the sub-prefecture-level city of Dengzhou.

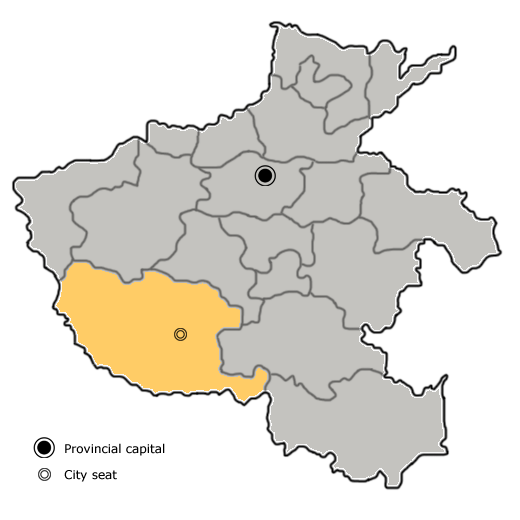
- Nanyang in Henan
- Coordinates: 32°40′57″N 112°48′30″E
- Country: People's Republic of China
- Province: Henan
- Prefecture-level city: Nanyang

Area
  - Total: 2,497 km^{2} (964 sq mi)

Population (2019)
  - Total: 1,200,700
  - Density: 480.9/km^{2} (1,245/sq mi)
- Time zone: UTC+8 (China Standard)
- Postal code: 473400

Tanghe County
- Traditional Chinese: 唐河縣
- Simplified Chinese: 唐河县
- Hanyu Pinyin: Tánghé xiàn
Transcriptions
Standard Mandarin
- Hanyu Pinyin: Tánghé xiàn
- Wade–Giles: T'ang-ho hsien

Tanghe County is administered by the prefecture-level city of Nanyang, in the southwest of Henan province, People's Republic of China, bordering Hubei province to the south. Its ancient name was Tangzhou (唐州).

The county consists of 3 subdistrict offices, 12 towns, 7 townships, and 525 administrative villages (or community), with the population being approximately 1,430,000 and total area being 2,512 square kilometres (970 sq mi). Tanghe has more than 350,000 citizens in those 3 subdistrict offices (include Binhe, Wenfeng and Xingtang), and the county government is located in the Binhe subdistrict office. The urban area expands very quickly, especially westwards, under the background of estate boom across China. The local economy is mainly based on agriculture, including wheat, cotton, pears. The investment and support from the Tanghers who work out of Tanghe is very important to the local economy.

== History ==
=== Pre-Tang dynasty ===
- In the Xia dynasty and Shang dynasty, Belonging to Yuzhou from the book “Yugong” (《禹贡》).
- In the Zhou dynasty, is the land of Shen (申), Xie (谢), Tang (唐) and Liao (蓼) Kingdoms.
- In the Qin dynasty, the Huyang (湖阳) County was set, and belonged to the Nanyang Commandery (南阳郡).
- In the Western Han dynasty, the Eastern Han dynasty and Three Kingdoms, was Huyang County (town), and belongs to the Nanyang region.
- In the Jin dynasty (266–420), was the land of Jiyang (棘阳) county, and belongs to Yiyang (义阳) region.
- In the Northern and Southern Dynasties, the Northern Wei Kingdom set Zhongli (钟离), Xiangcheng (襄城), Chenyang (陈阳), Shima (石马) Morogata, respectively belongs to south Xiangzhou (南襄州), west Huai'an (西淮安) region and Xiangcheng (襄城) region. The urban district in Tanghe now was the county government at that time, then was the state government and the county government later, respectively.
- In the Sui dynasty, there are two Counties named Shangma (上马) and Huyang (湖阳) in the territory, and belongs to the Chongling (舂陵) Region.

=== Tang dynasty and later ===
In the first year of Zhenguan (672 A.D.) of Tang Emperor Taizong, the Shangma County was incorporated to the Huyang County, and the Huzhou (湖州) state was abolished and be changed to Tangzhou (唐州) (the State government in Zaoyang now). In the 9th year of Tang Emperor Taizong, the State government was moved to Biyang (比阳) (the Biyang now). In the 13th year of Kaiyuan (725 A.D.) of Tang Emperor Xuanzong, re-established the Shangma County divided from Huyang County, and all belong to the Tangzhou State. In the 1st year of Tianbao (742 A. D.) of Tang Emperor Xuanzong, the Shangma County was renamed Biyang (泌阳) County (the County government is near the urban district of Tanghe County now), and belongs to Tangzhou State. In the 3rd year of Tianyou (906 A.D.) of Tang Emperor Aidi, the state government was moved from Biyang (比阳) to Biyang (泌阳) (now the urban district of Tanghe County), and Tangzhou State was renamed to Bizhou (泌州) State.

In the Five Dynasties and Ten Kingdoms, it was named the Biyang (泌阳) County, then belonging to Bizhou State, Tangzhou State and Bizhou State in the Later Liang Kingdom, Later Tang Kingdom and Later Jin Kingdom, respectively. It then belonged to Tangzhou State in the Later Han and Later Zhou Kingdom.

In the Song dynasty and Jin dynasty (1115–1234), was Biyang (泌阳) County and Huyang County, all belongs to Tangzhou State.

==== South Song dynasty ====
In the 11th year of Shaoxing (1141 A.D.) of Song Emperor Gaozong, it belonged to Jin Kingdom, and returned to South Song in the 31st year of Shaoxing. In the 2nd year of Longxing (1164 A. D.) of South Song Emperor Xiaozong, belonged to Jin Kingdom. In the alternately of South Song and Jin, the attribute had no changed. In the 6th year of Jiading of South Song Emperor Ningzong, also the 1st year of Zhining of Jin Emperor Weishao (1213 A.D.), the Huyang County was abolished and incorporated to Biyang (泌阳) County (now Tanghe) as Huyang Town, and belongs to Tangzhou State. In the 1st year of Duanping (1234 A.D.) of South Song Emperor Lizong, the Jin Kingdom was eliminated by the union of Mongol Kingdom and Song Kingdom, the Biyang (泌阳) County (now Tanghe) returned to South Song and belongs to Tangzhou State.

==== Yuan dynasty ====
During the Yuan dynasty in the 2nd year of Zhiyuan (1265 A.D.) of Yuan Emperor Shizu Kublai Khan, the Huyang County was re-established separate from the Biyang County (now Tanghe) and belongs to Tangzhou State. At this time, the Tangzhou State administered Biyang (泌阳) (now tanghe), Huyang, Biyang (比阳) (now Biyang) and Tongbai this four Counties. In the 3rd year of Zhiyuan (1266 A.D.), the Huyang, Biyang (比阳) and Tongbai Counties were abolished and set Huyang, Biyang (比阳) and Tongbai Town, respectively, and incorporated to Tangzhou State. Then the Biyang (泌阳) (now tanghe) was incorporated to Tangzhou State too. At this time, the Tangzhou State had no County to administrate at all, and belongs to the Jiangbei Road of Henan. In the 8th year (1271 A.D.), belongs to Nanyang Fu (南阳府).

==== Ming dynasty ====
In the 2nd year of Hongwu (1369 A.D.) during the Ming dynasty, the Tangzhou State was abolished and set Tang County (govern the urban district of now Tanghe), belongs to Nanyang Fu. In the 14th year (1381 A.D.), the Biyang (比阳) Town was separated from Tang County and set Biyang (泌阳) County (govern the now Biyang County). In the 12th year of Chenghua (1476 A.D.), the Tongbai Town was separated and set Tongbai County (govern the now Tongbai County).

==== Qing dynasty ====
During the Qing dynasty, the governance was inherited and followed the system of the Ming dynasty.

==== Republic of China ====
In 1912, Tanghe was Tang County, belonging to Nanyang Fu. In 1913, renamed the Biyuan (沘源) County, belongs to Yunan (South Henan) Road. In 1914, changed and belongs to Ruyang Road. In 1923, renamed Tanghe County, belong to Ruyang Road. In 1927, the Ruyang Road was abolished, the County belongs to Henan Province. In 1932, changed and belongs to the Sixth District Chief Inspector of Henan Province.

In November 1948, the county was captured by the PLA. On December 28, the Tanghe County (also named Tangbei County, government located in the now urban district), Tangnan County (dominate the south of Sanjiahe River, government located in the now Qiyi Town) were established. In the August of next year, the Tangxi County (government located in the now Zhangdian Town). In 1947–1948, the Tanghe (or Tangbei), Tangnan and Tangxi Counties in the territory, and all belongs to the First Patriotic Democratic Chief Inspector of Tongbai Region. In winter 1948, the Tanghe (Tangbei) County was changed and belongs to the Second Patriotic Democratic Chief Inspector of Tongbai Region. In March 1949, the Tanghe (Tangbei), Tangnan and Tangxi County merge into Tanghe County, the county government located in now Tanghe County, belongs to Nanyang Region.

==== People's Republic of China ====
Post-1949, the area remained Tanghe County, still belonging to Nanyang Region.

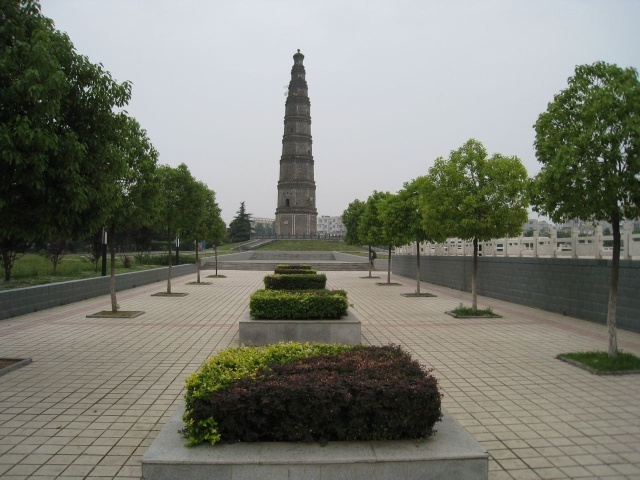
Wenfeng pataga

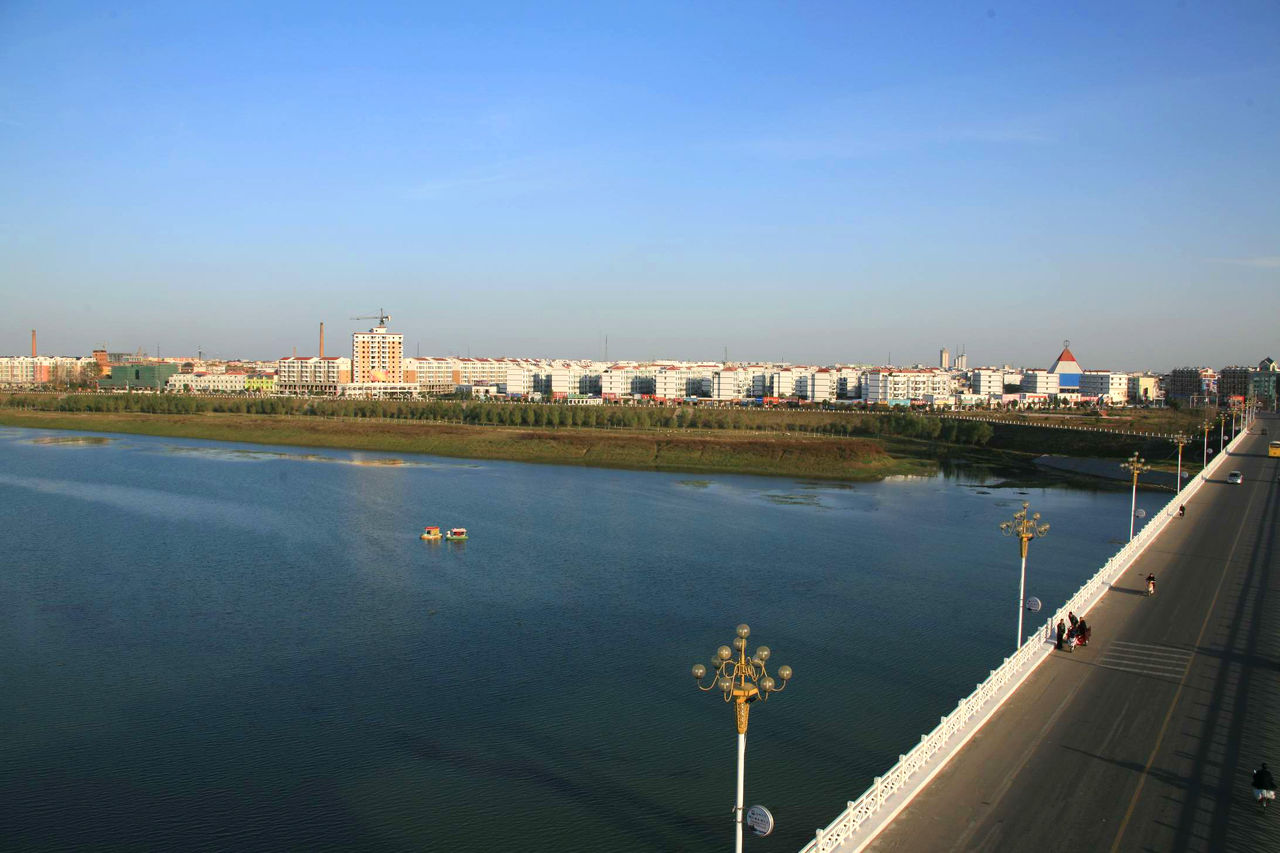
A look eastwards from Fengshan park

== Administrative divisions ==
As of 2012, this county is divided to 2 subdistricts, 12 towns and 7 townships.

Subdistricts

- Binhe Subdistrict (滨河街道)
- Wenfeng Subdistrict | 文峰街道)

Towns

- Yuantan (源潭镇)
- Zhangdian (张店镇)
- Guotan (郭滩镇)
- Huyang (湖阳镇)
- Heilong (黑龙镇)
- Dahetun (大河屯镇)
- Longtan (龙潭镇)
- Tongzhaipu (桐寨铺镇)
- Cangtai (苍台镇)
- Shangtun (上屯镇)
- Bidian (毕店镇)
- Shaobaisi (少拜寺镇)

Townships

- Chengjiao Township (城郊乡)
- Tonghe Township (桐河乡)
- Zangang Township (昝岗乡)
- Qiyi Township (祁仪乡)
- Mazhenfu Township (马振抚乡)
- Gucheng Township (古城乡)
- Dongwangji Township (东王集乡)

== Climate ==
Climate data for Tanghe, elevation 97 m (318 ft), (1991–2020 normals, extremes 1981–present)
Month	Jan	Feb	Mar	Apr	May	Jun	Jul	Aug	Sep	Oct	Nov	Dec	Year
Record high °C (°F)	20.6 (69.1)	23.2 (73.8)	31.6 (88.9)	34.5 (94.1)	38.4 (101.1)	39.9 (103.8)	41.7 (107.1)	38.4 (101.1)	39.3 (102.7)	32.3 (90.1)	27.8 (82.0)	21.1 (70.0)	41.7 (107.1)
Mean daily maximum °C (°F)	6.9 (44.4)	10.5 (50.9)	15.6 (60.1)	22.2 (72.0)	27.6 (81.7)	31.3 (88.3)	32.1 (89.8)	31.2 (88.2)	27.4 (81.3)	22.4 (72.3)	15.3 (59.5)	9.1 (48.4)	21.0 (69.7)
Daily mean °C (°F)	1.8 (35.2)	4.9 (40.8)	10.0 (50.0)	16.2 (61.2)	21.7 (71.1)	26.0 (78.8)	27.6 (81.7)	26.4 (79.5)	22.1 (71.8)	16.7 (62.1)	9.9 (49.8)	3.9 (39.0)	15.6 (60.1)
Mean daily minimum °C (°F)	−2.3 (27.9)	0.2 (32.4)	4.9 (40.8)	10.7 (51.3)	16.3 (61.3)	21.2 (70.2)	23.8 (74.8)	22.6 (72.7)	17.8 (64.0)	12.1 (53.8)	5.4 (41.7)	−0.3 (31.5)	11.0 (51.9)
Record low °C (°F)	−16.0 (3.2)	−15.2 (4.6)	−10.7 (12.7)	−0.9 (30.4)	4.4 (39.9)	12.2 (54.0)	17.4 (63.3)	13.0 (55.4)	8.7 (47.7)	0.6 (33.1)	−5.4 (22.3)	−19.0 (−2.2)	−19.0 (−2.2)
Average precipitation mm (inches)	16.3 (0.64)	18.4 (0.72)	37.1 (1.46)	55.7 (2.19)	91.0 (3.58)	118.4 (4.66)	165.5 (6.52)	134.3 (5.29)	77.2 (3.04)	58.4 (2.30)	37.0 (1.46)	14.3 (0.56)	823.6 (32.42)
Average precipitation days (≥ 0.1 mm)	5.2	6.3	7.6	8.1	10.0	9.4	11.9	11.3	9.7	8.5	7.0	5.1	100.1
Average snowy days	4.7	3.4	1.3	0	0	0	0	0	0	0	0.9	2.4	12.7
Average relative humidity (%)	70	69	69	69	67	69	79	80	75	71	72	70	72
Mean monthly sunshine hours	116.7	118.9	153.4	181.0	187.5	181.3	191.1	183.4	150.8	148.3	133.4	127.4	1,873.2
Percentage possible sunshine	37	38	41	46	44	43	44	45	41	43	43	41	42
Source: China Meteorological Administration

== Transport ==
- Tanghe Railway Station Nanjing–Xi'an Railway goes through the southern suburb of Tanghe.
- G40 Shanghai–Xi'an Expressway goes through the northern suburb of the town.
- China National Highway [G312], [G328] and [G234] go through the county.
- Henan Provincial Road [S233], [S332], [S334] and [S530] go through the towns.
- Nanyang Jiangying Airport is about 40 km away from Tanghe city.
- Tanghe River Shipping has been included in the national twelfth Five-Year Development Plan.

=== Public transportation ===
Connections between Tanghe city and all its towns are provided by buses.

== Notable residents ==
- Feng Youlan (1895.12.04 — 1990.11.26), Philosopher. Graduate from Peking University in 1918. A History of Chinese Philosophy (1934, in two volumes), A Short History of Chinese Philosophy(1948), A New History of Chinese Philosophy, Six Books in Zhen and Yuan as his representatives.
- Feng Jinglan (1898.3.9 — 1976.9.29), geologist. Graduate from Colorado School of Mines in 1921. A professor of Beijing Institute of Geology (The original name of the China University of Geosciences).
- Feng Yuanjun (1900 — 1974), female, a famous writer.
- Li Ji (1922.8.16 — 1980), poet.
- Zhang Xingjiang (1907 — 1936), revolutionary martyrs.
- Zhang Fengyi (1956.9.1 — ), a famous actor.
