= Tibetan Americans =

Part of the Tibetan Diaspora

Total population
- 26,700 (Central Tibetan Administration estimate, 2020)

Regions with significant populations
- California (mainly Northern California), Colorado, Minnesota, Vermont, New Jersey, New York, Virginia, Maryland, Washington, D.C., Boston, Austin, Wisconsin, Chicago, Indiana, Oregon, Southern California, Los Angeles, Louisiana (New Orleans)

Languages
- Tibetan, English

Religion
- Tibetan Buddhism

Related ethnic groups
- Tibetans, Chinese Americans, Burmese Americans, Bhutanese Americans, Nepalese Americans and other Asian Americans particularly Americans of East Asian and South Asian descent

Tibetan Americans are Americans of Tibetan ancestry. As of 2020, more than 26,700 Americans are estimated to have Tibetan ancestry. The majority of Tibetan Americans reside in Queens, New York.

== History ==
Ethnic Tibetans began to immigrate to the United States in the late 1950s. Section 134 of the Immigration Act of 1990 gave a boost to the Tibetan immigration to the US, by providing 1,000 immigrant visas to Tibetans living in India and Nepal. Chain migration followed, and by 1998 the Tibetan American population had grown to around 5,500, according to a census conducted by Central Tibetan Administration (CTA). The 2000 US census counted 5,147 US residents who reported Tibetan ancestry.

=== Immigration timeline ===
- 1948: Telopa Rinpoche is hired by Johns Hopkins University to teach Tibetan Buddhism.
- 1952: 14th Dalai Lama's elder brother, Taktser Rinpoche and his friend Dhondup Gyaltsen immigrate to the United States.
- 1955: Geshe Ngawang Wangyal arrives in the US He serves as religious leader and spiritual teacher of a Kalmyk Mongolian community in New Jersey and teaches at Columbia University.
- 1957–1971: Tibetan guerrilla fighters are trained by the CIA and launch numerous incursions into Tibet.
- 1958: The first Tibetan Buddhist monastery in North America, Labsum Shedrup Ling, is established in New Jersey under the spiritual guidance of Geshe Wangyal.
- 1960: The Rockefeller Foundation establishes eight centers for Tibetan studies in the US, which invite 17 Tibetan lamas.
- 1964: Six Tibetans, four from India and two from the US, enroll in a year-long special intensive program at Cornell University to study public administration and economics.
- 1967–1969: Six Tibetans immigrate to the US to work as lumberjacks for the Great Northern Paper Company in Portage Lake, Maine. The following year, 21 others joined them.
- 1971: The CIA cancels its covert operations supporting Tibetan guerrillas following President Richard Nixon's trip to China and a new era of improved US–Sino relations.
- 1986: There are 256 Tibetans living in the US according to a population survey conducted by the Office of Tibet, New York.
- 1988: Tibet Fund begins administering yearly Fulbright Program scholarship grants to bring Tibetans students and professionals to the US for higher education.
- 1989: The Tibetan United States Resettlement Project (TUSRP) is established to support the resettlement of 1,000 Tibetans. Edward Bednar is appointed director.
- April 1989: ICT president Tenzin Tethong, the Dalai Lama's Representative Rinchen Dharlo and Edward Bednar meet with pro-Tibet organizations, resettlement agencies, congressional staff, immigration law advisors, etc. to begin 18 months of advocacy for TUSRP.
- 1991: As part of Fulbright scholarships administered by Tibet Fund, Berea College in Berea, Kentucky enrolls the first batch of two students with two succeeding each following year to study in 4 year undergraduate programs. The program still continues with over 20 graduates, who have mostly resettled in America.
- 1992: The first group of the 1,000 Tibetans arrives in the US under the TUSRP and settles in six cluster sites throughout the US.
- 1993: In little more than a year since the first group of Tibetans arrived in 1992, 21 cluster sites open in 18 different states across the United States.
- 1993–2002: Through family reunification, more Tibetans arrive to join the original 1,000. By 2002 there are approximately 8,650 Tibetans and 30 Tibetan community associations in the United States.

== Demography ==
An estimate of c. 7,000 was made in 2001, and in 2008 the CTA's Office of Tibet in New York informally estimated the Tibetan population in the US at around 9,000. In 2020, The Central Tibetan Administration estimated the number of Tibetans living in the United States to be over 26,700. The migration of the Tibetans to the United States took on the pattern of 22 "cluster groups", located primarily in the Northeast, the Great Lakes region and the Intermountain West. Other communities include Austin, Texas and Charlottesville, Virginia. Tibetan Americans who are born in Tibet or elsewhere in Tibet are officially recognized as Chinese nationals not by choice due to China's occupation of Tibet.

=== Northeast ===
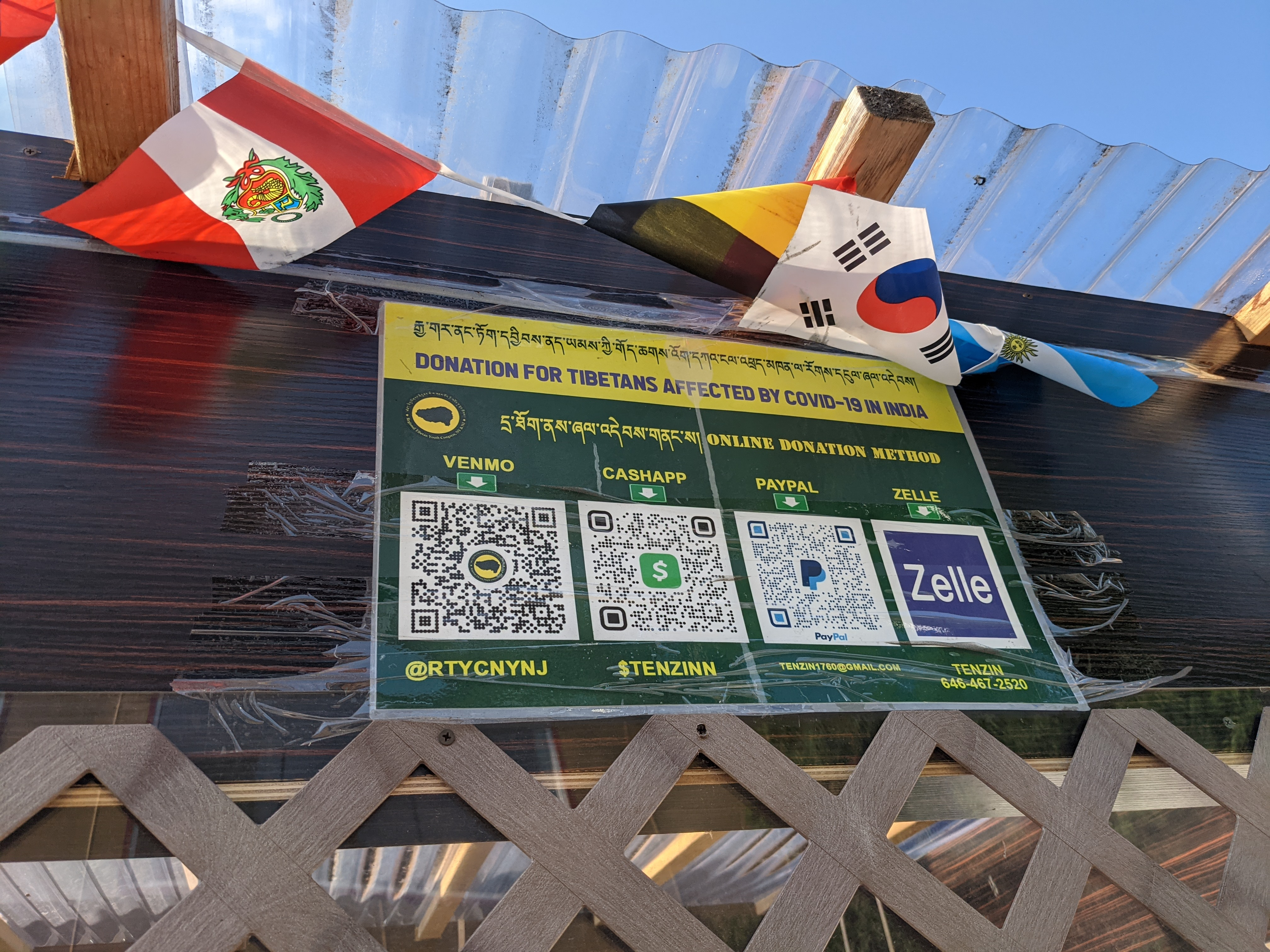
Advert in New York's "Little Tibet" neighborhood, urging Tibetan Americans to contribute to COVID-19 relief efforts for members of the diaspora struggling through India's 2021 COVID-19 outbreak.

Communities of Tibetan Americans in the Northeast exist in Boston and Amherst, Massachusetts, Ithaca, New York, and New York City, and in the states of Connecticut, Vermont, and New Jersey. In New York and New Jersey, they live primarily in Queens and New Brunswick.

Ithaca, New York, is also the location of the Namgyal Monastery Institute of Buddhist Studies, founded in 1992, considered by many to be the North American seat of the Dalai Lama's personal monastery, and which includes the Du Khor Choe Ling Monastery and the Dalai Lama Library and Learning Center.

The town of Northfield, Vermont has been home for many years to the seat of the current Trijang Rinpoche, who has been estranged from the Dalai Lama due to the Dorje Shugden controversy, which has become a cultural heritage center for thousands of followers.

=== Mid-Atlantic ===
In the Mid-Atlantic region, the largest communities can be found in Northern Virginia, Washington, D.C., Montgomery County, Maryland, Philadelphia, Pennsylvania, and Charlottesville, Virginia.

=== Great Lakes region ===
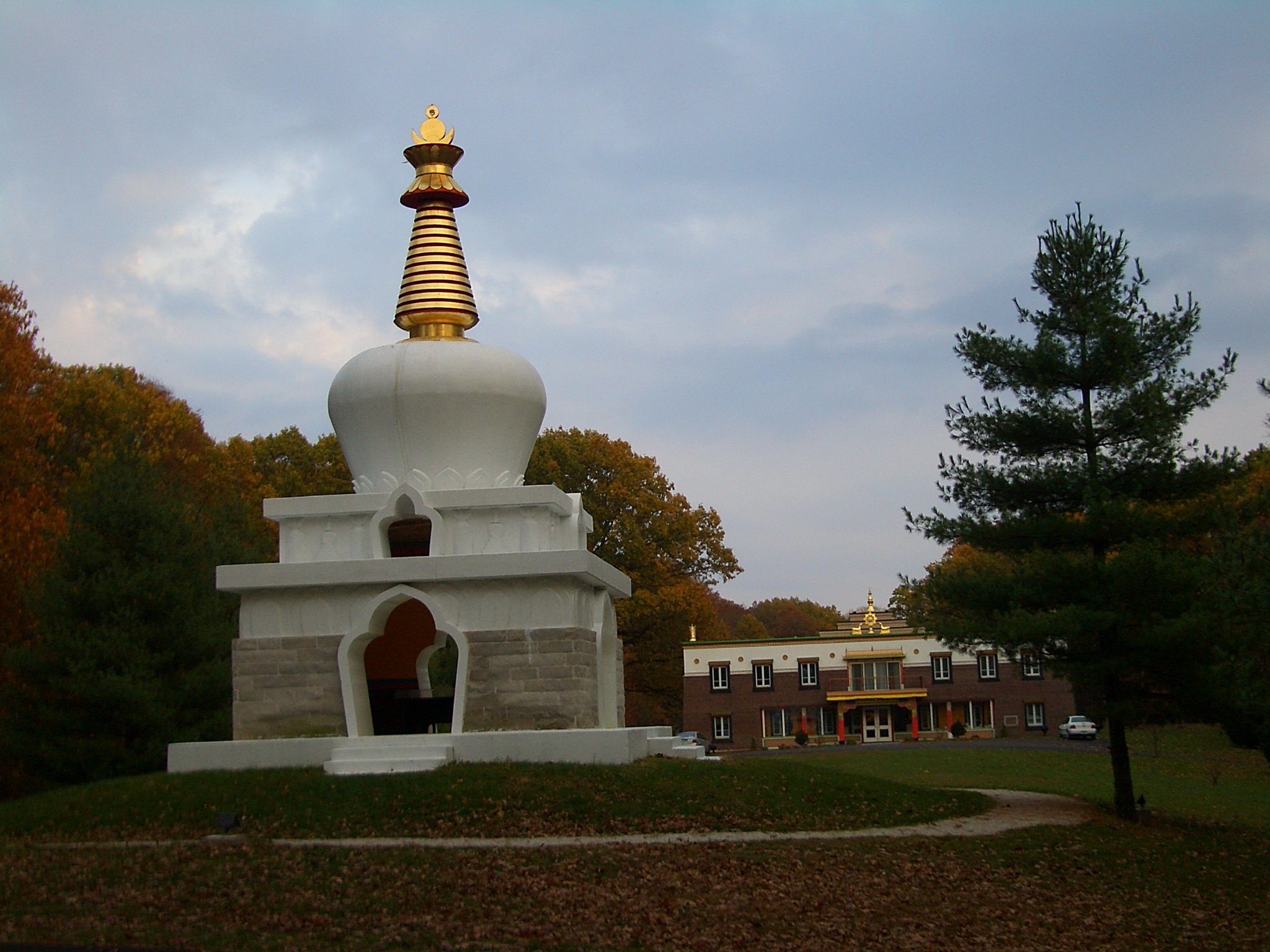
On the grounds of Tibetan Mongolian Buddhist Cultural Center, Bloomington, Indiana

Communities of Tibetan Americans in the Great Lakes region exist in Chicago and in the states of Minnesota, Ohio, Indiana, Wisconsin, and Michigan. There is a Tibetan Mongol Buddhist Cultural Center in Bloomington, Indiana near the campus of Indiana University. The late brother of the Dalai Lama, Thubten Jigme Norbu was a professor at the university.

Minnesota has the second largest concentration of Tibetan Americans in the United States.

=== Western United States ===
Communities of Tibetan Americans in the western U.S. exist in Seattle, Washington, Portland, Oregon, Berkeley, California, several locations in Southern California, and in the cities and states of Colorado Springs, Colorado, Boise, Idaho, Montana, Albuquerque, New Mexico, Washington, and Salt Lake City, Utah.

Every year, Seattle holds an annual Tibet Festival in August.

==== Colorado ====
Although quite small in number overall, Colorado has one of the highest concentrations of Tibetans in North America, focused on Boulder, Colorado Springs, Douglas County and Crestone. The state has Naropa University whose values statement states, "We are Buddhist-inspired, ecumenical, and nonsectarian welcoming faculty, staff, and students of all faiths as well as those who don’t ascribe to any religion." There is a Buddhist commune west of Castle Rock and several cities have Tibetan outreach organizations. Colorado Springs alone has three Tibetan stores and a restaurant.

Much of the reason behind this rather peculiar demographic is that Tibetan guerrillas were secretly trained by the Central Intelligence Agency (CIA) at Camp Hale outside of Leadville. Camp Hale was used as a training camp for expatriate Tibetans to be inserted to aid the existing resistance in Tibet after the region was retaken by the Chinese People's Liberation Army, between 1959 and 1965.

From 1958 to 1960, Anthony Poshepny trained various special missions teams, including Tibetan Khambas and Hui Muslims, for operations in China against the Communist government. Poshepny sometimes claimed that he personally escorted the 14th Dalai Lama out of Tibet, but sources in the Tibetan exile deny this.

The site was chosen because of the similarities of the Rocky Mountains in the area with the Himalayan Plateau. The CIA parachuted four groups of Camp Hale trainees inside Tibet between 1959 and 1960 to contact the remaining resistance groups, but the missions resulted in the death or capture of many team members.

== Notable people ==
- Lodi Gyari, diplomat, former special envoy of the Dalai Lama
- Chögyam Trungpa, Buddhist meditation master
- Ngawang Wangyal, Buddhist priest and scholar
- Tarthang Tulku, introduced the Nyingma tradition of Tibetan Buddhism into the United States
- Thupten Jigme Norbu, Tibetan lama, writer, civil rights activist and professor of Tibetan studies
- Trijang Rinpoche, Gelug Lama and a direct disciple of Pabongkhapa Déchen Nyingpo
- Kesang Marstrand, folk singer, songwriter, and guitarist
- Lobsang Nyandak, former representative of the 14th Dalai Lama to the Americas and president of the Tibet Fund
- Aftab Pureval, Mayor of Cincinnati
- Tenzing Rigdol, artist
- Tenzing Norgay Trainor, American actor, grandson of Tenzing Norgay.

== See also ==
- Tibetan Canadians
- Students for a Free Tibet
- American Himalayan Foundation
- Tibet Fund
