= Taktser Rinpoche =

Tibetan lama lineage

Taktser Rinpoche (Tibetan: སྟག་འཚེར་རིན་པོ་ཆེ་, ZWPY: Dagcêr Rinboqê; Chinese: 当彩活佛) was born in 1922 in "the small village of Taktser, meaning 'roaring tiger,' located in the Amdo region of eastern Tibet." He became a lama of the Gelugpa school of Tibetan Buddhism and was named Thubten Jigme Norbu, the oldest brother of Tenzin Gyatso—the 14th Dalai Lama of Tibet. Soon after birth, he was recognized by the 13th Dalai Lama as the reincarnation of the previous Taktser Rinpoche, who was "one of the thirty or so reincarnated lamas who were a part of Kumbum's tradition." On September 5, 2008, Norbu, 86, died at his Indiana, US, home after illness for many years.

== Taktser Lama ==
Thubten Jigme Norbu's predecessor as the Taktser Rinpoche, known as Taktser Lama, was Norbu's and his brother the 14th Dalai Lama's paternal grandmother's elder brother, in other words their great uncle. One of the 30 or so reincarnated lamas who were part of Kumbum Monastery's tradition, he had been recognised as the Taktser Lama some time in the 1860s, taken from his family and raised and educated at Kumbum. Kumbum is a monastery of the Gelugpa tradition.

"During the turmoil of the Manchu decline", Taktser Lama left Kumbum to live in Mongolia for several decades at the end of the 19th century. Mongolians being fervent devotees of the Gelugpa school, he "developed quite a devoted following there." Thanks to his Mongolian disciples' generous offerings, at the start of the twentieth century he returned to Kumbum Monastery a wealthy lama; he was said to have owned 10,000 camels.

Taktser Lama then utilised his newly accumulated wealth to benefit his family in Taktser village, including the parents of his eventual successor Thubten Jigme Norbu. He bought back 45 acres of land they had lost when Manchu troops, in quelling a late-nineteenth century rebellion had destroyed the entire village of Taktser and driven the family away to live in caves in poverty. They were also enabled to build a new, large home where Thubten Jigme Norbu as well as the future 14th Dalai Lama were eventually born.

At this time, Taktser Lama came to know the 13th Dalai Lama, who twice stayed long periods at Kumbum, firstly to avoid the Younghusband Expedition to Lhasa in 1904 and again in 1909 when returning to Lhasa after a trip to Beijing. By his support of the Dalai Lama's reform at Kumbum Monastery and his strict re-enforcement of monastic discipline, which had degenerated, Taktser Lama won the Dalai Lama's respect but became unpopular with his fellow monks; when the Dalai Lama left for Lhasa Taktser Lama also left for some years. He returned to Kumbum and Taktser by the time of Thubten Jigme Norbu's parents' wedding in 1917, and died there a year or two later.

== The search for the reincarnation ==
The deceased lama's monastic staff were responsible to search for the next incarnation. Guided by omens and hints the lama might have given before his death, they sought suitable boys recently born in the area. A shortlist was made and sent to the Dalai Lama in Lhasa, a journey of several months, for divination as to the right candidate. The Dalai Lama's response was that the reincarnation was not on the list since he had not yet been born. When Norbu's mother Diki Tsering gave birth to a girl on 1920 her own mother, hoping it would be a boy and a successful candidate to be chosen as the lama, became so distressed and disappointed that she fell ill and died.

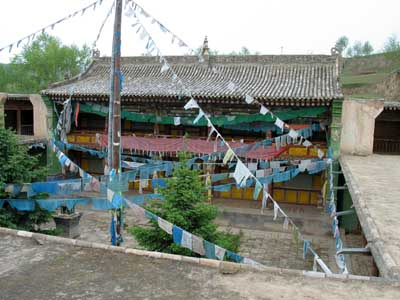
Birthplace home of eldest brother Thubten Jigme Norbu, Tenzin Gyatso- the 14th Dalai Lama of Tibet, 2nd eldest brother Gyalo Thondup, eldest sister Tsering Dolma

The search resumed but after another year of compilation, whittling down the names and travelling to Lhasa to seek a decision from the Dalai Lama, the second shortlist met with the same answer. Now it was the aging search leader's turn to become sick with distress and disappointment on the way back to Kumbum from Lhasa, and he also died. A new manager was appointed to take his place and meanwhile, in 1922, Diki Tsering gave birth to a son. This time his name was added to the next shortlist, the third, and at last the response from the 13th Dalai Lama was positive - Diki Tsering had given birth to the incarnation of Taktser Lama and Thubten Jigme Norbu became Taktser Rinpoche.

In the late 1930s, the original family name of Taktser changed for the other family members. Gyalo Thondup wrote, "My family was officially anointed into the aristocracy with my brother's ascension to the Dalai Lama's throne. Our original family name of Taktser was changed to Taklha,"

== Bibliography ==
- Thondup, Gyalo; Thurston, Anne F. The Noodle Maker of Kalimpong (2015) Rider, London. ISBN 9781846043826
- Norbu, Thubten Jigme Tibet is My Country: Autobiography of Thubten Jigme Norbu, Brother of the Dalai Lama as told to Heinrich Harrer (1986) Wisdom Publications, London. ISBN 0861710452
