= Xiaoxia Subdistrict, Qinghai =

Xiaoxia Subdistrict 小峡街道
- Subdistrict
- Location in Qinghai
- Coordinates: 36°31′53″N 101°58′12″E
- Country: China
- Province: Qinghai
- Prefecture-level city: Haidong
- District: Ping'an District

Area
  - Total: 62.22 km^{2} (24.02 sq mi)

Population (2010)
  - Total: 10,623
  - Density: 170.7/km^{2} (442.2/sq mi)
- Time zone: UTC+8 (China Standard)
- Local dialing code: 972

Xiaoxia Subdistrict (Chinese: 小峡街道; pinyin: Xiǎoxiá Jiēdào) is a subdistrict in Ping'an District, Haidong, Qinghai, China. Xiaoxia Subdistrict was upgraded from a town in March 2022 to reflect increasing urbanization within it. In 2010, Xiaoxia Subdistrict had a total population of 10,623: 5,497 males and 5,126 females: 2,101 aged under 14, 7,840 aged between 15 and 65 and 682 aged over 65.

== Administrative divisions ==
Xiaoxia Subdistrict administers the following residential community (Chinese: 社区; pinyin: shèqū) and 12 administrative villages (Chinese: 行政村; pinyin: xíngzhèng cūn):

- Xiaoxia Community (Chinese: 小峡社区)
- Xiadian Village (Chinese: 下店村)
- Xishangzhuang Village (Chinese: 西上庄村)
- Hongtuzhuang Village (Chinese: 红土庄村)
- Wangjiazhuang Village (Chinese: 王家庄村)
- Salipu Village (Chinese: 卅里铺村)
- Shangdian Village (Chinese: 上店村)
- Baicaowan Village (Chinese: 百草湾村)
- Shanghongzhuang Village (Chinese: 上红庄村)
- Xiahongzhuang Village (Chinese: 下红庄村)
- Liuwan Village (Chinese: 柳湾村)
- Shijiaying Village (Chinese: 石家营村)
- Guchengya Village (Chinese: 古城崖村)
