= Sanhe, Qinghai =

Sanhe 三合镇
- Town
- Location in Qinghai
- Coordinates: 36°25′42″N 101°56′52″E
- Country: China
- Province: Qinghai
- Prefecture-level city: Haidong
- District: Ping'an
- Village-level divisions: 1 residential community 18 villages
- Elevation: 2,387 m (7,831 ft)
- Time zone: UTC+8 (China Standard)
- Area code: 0972

Sanhe (Chinese: 三合; pinyin: Sānhé) is a town in Ping'an District, Haidong, Qinghai, China, located 16 kilometres (9.9 mi) southwest of downtown Haidong and 14 kilometres (9.9 kilometers) southwest of Xining Caojiabao Airport. As of 2018, it has one residential community and 18 villages under its administration.
