= Thubten Jigme Norbu =

Tibetan activist (1922–2008)

- Norbu with his brother, the 14th Dalai Lama, in 1996

Personal life
- Born: August 16, 1922 Taktser, Tibet
- Died: September 5, 2008 (aged 86) Bloomington, Indiana, U.S.

Religious life
- Religion: Tibetan Buddhism

Thubten Jigme Norbu on the cover of his 1961 book Tibet is My Country: Autobiography of Thubten Jigme Norbu, Brother of the Dalai Lama as told to Heinrich Harrer (translation from German by Edward Fitzgerald)

The 6th Taktser Rinpoche Thubten Jigme Norbu (Tibetan: ཐུབ་བསྟན་འཇིགས་མེད་ནོར་བུ་, Wylie: Thub-stan 'Jigs-med Nor-bu) (August 16, 1922 – September 5, 2008), was a Tibetan lama, writer, civil rights activist and professor of Tibetan studies and was the eldest brother of the 14th Dalai Lama, Tenzin Gyatso. He was one of the first high-profile Tibetans to go into exile and was the first to settle in the United States.

== Early life ==
Thubten Jigme Norbu was born in 1922 in the small, mountain village of Taktser in the Amdo County of Eastern Tibet.

== Independence walks ==
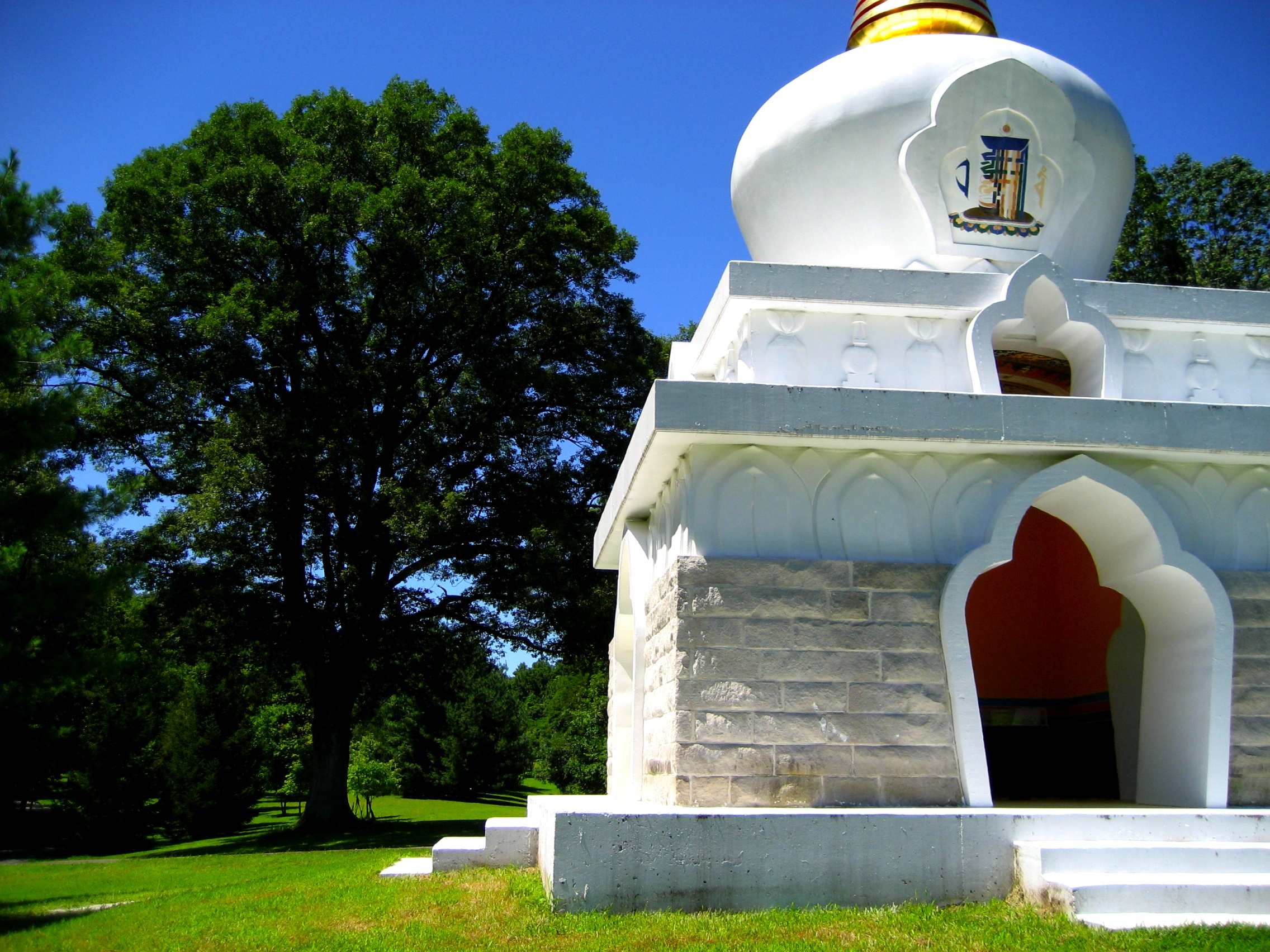
Stupa on the grounds of Tibetan Mongolian Buddhist Cultural Center, Bloomington, Indiana. The Dalai Lama performed the initiation here in 1999, "to promote world peace."

In 1995, Norbu cofounded the International Tibet Independence Movement (ITIM). He led three walks for Tibet's independence, starting in 1995 with a week-long walk 80 miles (130 kilometers) from Bloomington, Indiana to Indianapolis, Indiana. In 1996 he led a 300-mile (480-kilometer), 45-day walk from the PRC embassy in Washington, DC to the Headquarters of the United Nations in New York City. The following year, joined by Dadon with her three-year-old son, he led a 600-mile (970-kilometer) walk from Toronto to New York City, beginning on March 10 (Tibetan Uprising Day) and ending June 14 (Flag Day).

== Life in the US ==
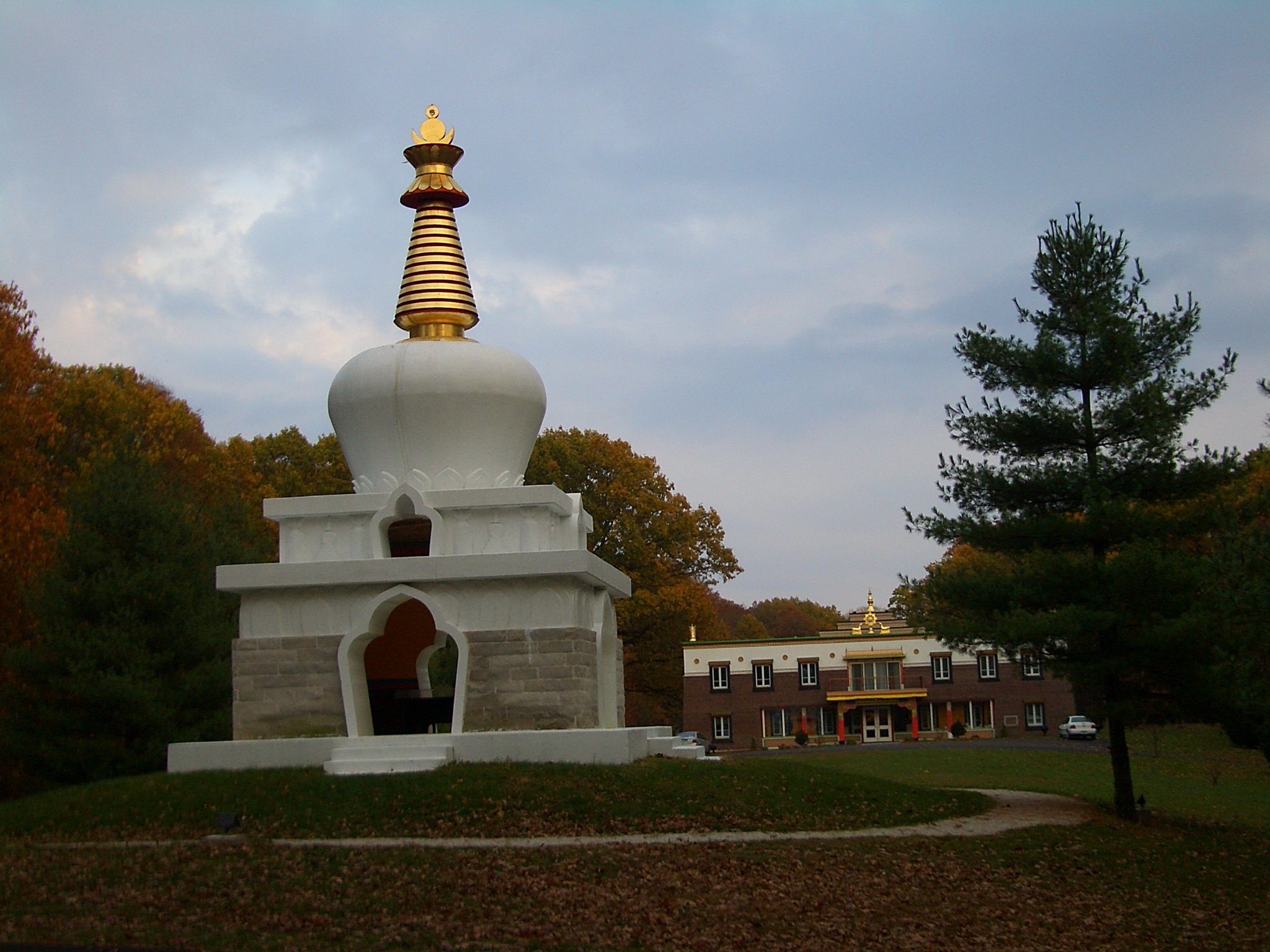
On the grounds of Tibetan Mongolian Buddhist Cultural Center, Bloomington, Indiana

Norbu lived at the Tibetan-Mongolian Buddhist Cultural Center with his wife Kunyang. They have three sons, Lhundrup, Kunga and Jigme Norbu, all born in New York. Norbu moved to Bloomington in 1965 to teach college students as a professor of Tibetan Studies at Indiana University Bloomington where he taught until retirement from IUB in 1987. In late 2002, Norbu suffered a series of strokes and became an invalid.

Norbu died at the age of 86 on September 5, 2008, at his home in Indiana in the United States having been ill for several years. His body was cremated in a traditional Buddhist ceremony.

Norbu's wife Kunyang briefly ran a Tibetan restaurant in Bloomington.

His youngest son, Jigme, died at the age of 45 on February 14, 2011, while carrying on his father's work. He was hit by a car in Florida during a walk to promote Tibetan independence and raise awareness of Tibet.

== Writings ==
- Tibet Is My Country is his autobiography dictated to Heinrich Harrer in 1959, and updated with a new essay in 1987 (ISBN 0861710452) and 2006 (ISBN 1425488587)
- Tibet: Its History, Religion and People, co-written with Colin Turnbull in 1968 (ISBN 0671205595)
- Tibet: The Issue Is Independence – Tibetans-in-Exile Address the Key Tibetan Issue the World Avoids is an essay collection from 1994 by Tibetans in the diaspora (mainly Tibetan Americans) and features an introduction by Norbu (ISBN 0938077759)
- Norbu and Robert B. Ekvall provided the first English translation of the Tibetan play originally authored by the fifth Panchen Lama Lobsang Yeshe Younger Brother Don Yod in 1969.
