= Shagou Township, Haidong =

Shagou Township 沙沟乡
- Township
- Location in Qinghai
- Coordinates: 36°23′40″N 102°2′33″E
- Country: China
- Province: Qinghai
- Prefecture-level city: Haidong
- District: Ping'an

Area
  - Total: 85.14 km^{2} (32.87 sq mi)

Population (2010)
  - Total: 7,496
  - Density: 88.04/km^{2} (228.0/sq mi)
- Time zone: UTC+8 (China Standard)
- Local dialing code: 972

Shagou Township (simplified Chinese: 沙沟乡; traditional Chinese: 沙溝鄉; pinyin: Shāgōu Xiāng) is a township in Ping'an District, Haidong, Qinghai, China. In 2010, Shagou Township had a total population of 7,496: 3,780 males and 3,716 females: 1,728 aged under 14, 5,181 aged between 15 and 65 and 587 aged over 65.

== Administrative divisions ==
Shagou Township administers the following 10 administrative villages:

- Shagou Village (Chinese: 沙沟村)
- Dazhaizi Village (Chinese: 大寨子村)
- Shu'erwan Village (Chinese: 树尔湾村)
- Shigouyan Village (Chinese: 石沟沿村)
- Lucaogou Village (Chinese: 芦草沟村)
- Houjiazhuang Village (Chinese: 侯家庄村)
- Zhongzhuang Village (Chinese: 中庄村)
- Sang'ang Village (Chinese: 桑昂村)
- Yazha Village (Chinese: 牙扎村)
- Sifangding Village (Chinese: 四方顶村)
