= Ping'an, Haidong =

Ping'an 平安区
- District
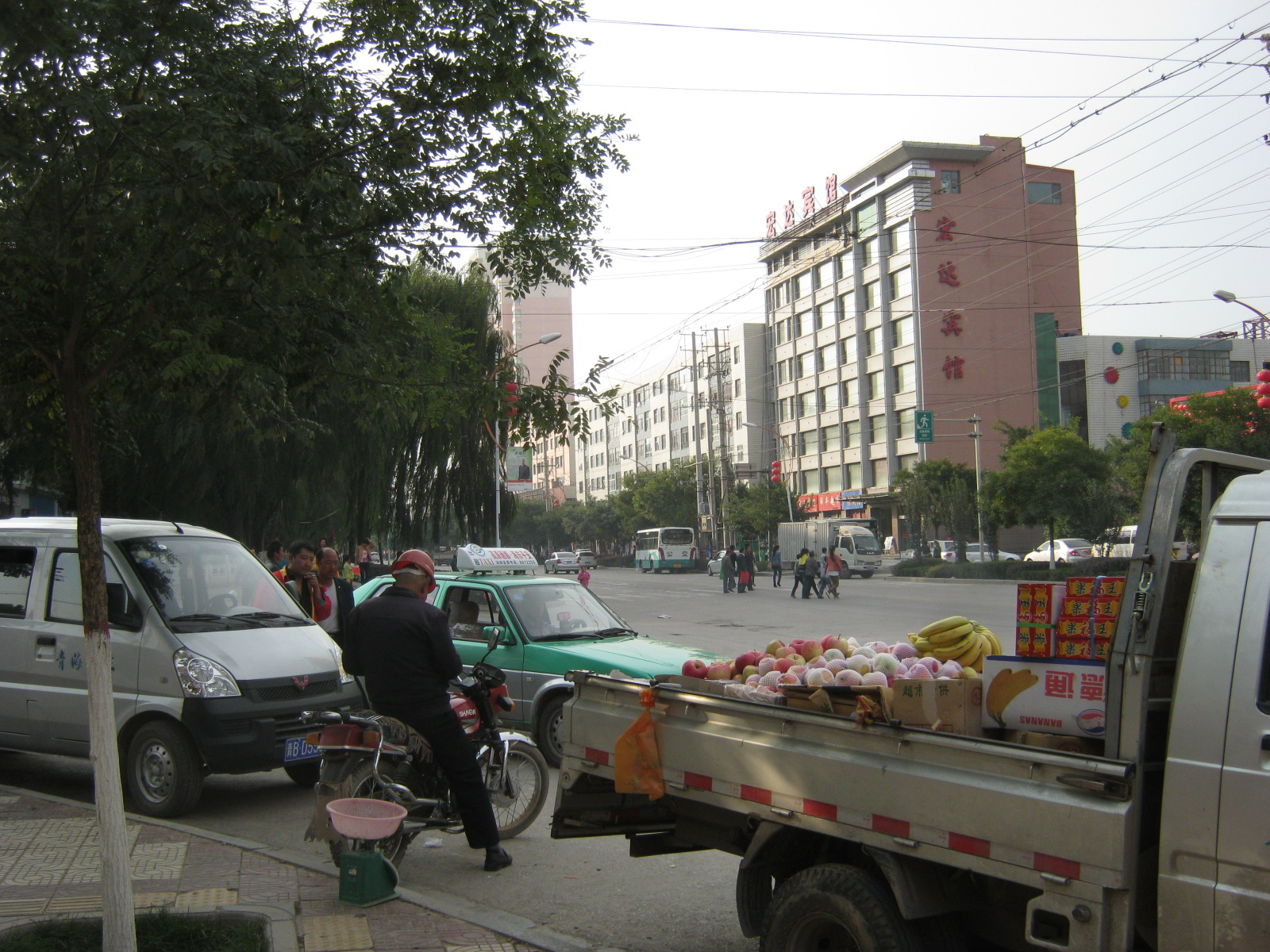

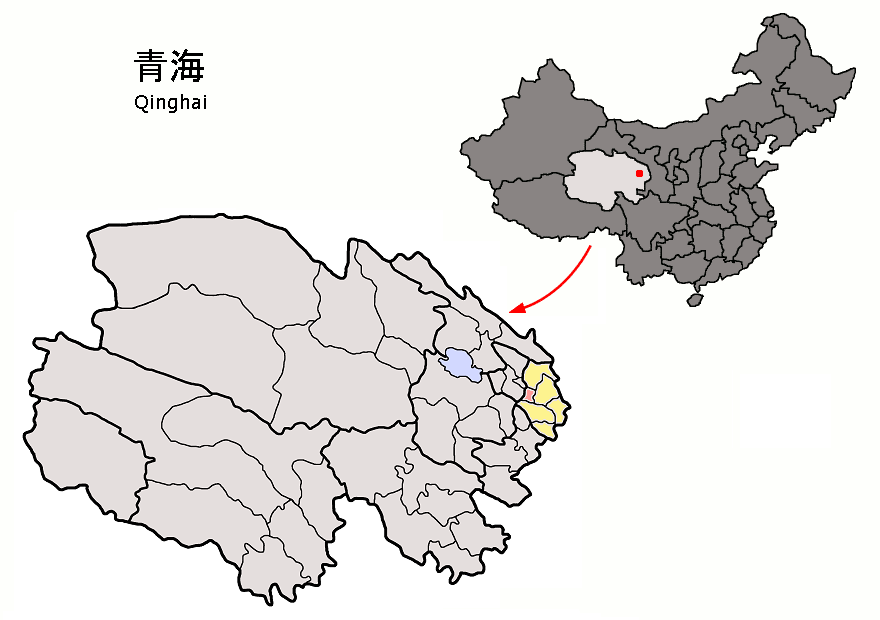
- Ping'an (pink) within Haidong City (yellow) and Qinghai
- Coordinates (Ping'an District government): 36°30′02″N 102°06′32″E
- Country: China
- Province: Qinghai
- Prefecture-level city: Haidong
- Seat: Ping'an Subdistrict

Area
  - Total: 742.89 km^{2} (286.83 sq mi)

Population (2020)
  - Total: 117,883
  - Density: 158.68/km^{2} (410.98/sq mi)
- Time zone: UTC+8 (China Standard)

Ping'an, Haidong

Chinese name
- Simplified Chinese: 平安区
- Traditional Chinese: 平安區
Transcriptions
Standard Mandarin
- Hanyu Pinyin: Píng'ān Qū

Tibetan name
- Tibetan: གཞོང་ཐང་ཁུལ།
Transcriptions
- Wylie: gzhong thang khul

Ping'an District (simplified Chinese: 平安区; traditional Chinese: 平安區; pinyin: Píng'ān Qū) formerly known as Ping'anyi (simplified Chinese: 平安驿; traditional Chinese: 平安驛; pinyin: Píng'ānyì), is an administrative district and the seat of the city of Haidong, in the east of Qinghai Province, China, located about 35 km (22 mi) east from Xining. Its postal code is 810600, and its population is 127,480, 29.4% of whom belong to ethnic minorities. The area is known for its Selenium resources.

During the Han dynasty it was known as Anyi County, and as Zhongge during the Tang dynasty, then as Pingrong and Ping'an during the Ming and Qing dynasty respectively. In 2015, Ping'an County became Ping'an District.

== Administrative divisions ==
Ping'an District is divided into two subdistricts, one town, five townships, and one other township-level division.

The district's two subdistricts are Ping'an Subdistrict (Chinese: 平安街道; pinyin: Píng'ān Jiēdào) and Xiaoxia Subdistrict (Chinese: 小峡街道; pinyin: Xiǎoxiá Jiēdào).

The district's sole town is Sanhe (Chinese: 三合镇; pinyin: Sānhé Zhèn).

The district's five township-level divisions are Hongshuiquan Township (Chinese: 洪水泉乡; pinyin: Hóngshuǐquán Xiāng), Shihuiyao Township (Chinese: 石灰窑乡; pinyin: Shíhuīyáo Xiāng), Gucheng Township (Chinese: 古城乡; pinyin: Gǔchéng Xiāng), Shagou Township (Chinese: 沙沟乡; pinyin: Shāgōu Xiāng), and Bazanggou Township (Chinese: 巴藏沟乡; pinyin: Bāzànggōu Xiāng).

== Climate ==
Climate data for Ping'an District, elevation 2,125 m (6,972 ft), (1991–2020 normals, extremes 1981–2010)
Month	Jan	Feb	Mar	Apr	May	Jun	Jul	Aug	Sep	Oct	Nov	Dec	Year
Record high °C (°F)	14.5 (58.1)	22.4 (72.3)	27.6 (81.7)	30.1 (86.2)	30.5 (86.9)	32.2 (90.0)	37.6 (99.7)	35.1 (95.2)	29.3 (84.7)	24.7 (76.5)	20.5 (68.9)	13.8 (56.8)	37.6 (99.7)
Mean daily maximum °C (°F)	2.4 (36.3)	6.3 (43.3)	11.6 (52.9)	17.6 (63.7)	21.2 (70.2)	24.4 (75.9)	26.2 (79.2)	25.2 (77.4)	20.3 (68.5)	15.2 (59.4)	9.4 (48.9)	3.9 (39.0)	15.3 (59.6)
Daily mean °C (°F)	−6.1 (21.0)	−2.1 (28.2)	3.6 (38.5)	9.6 (49.3)	13.6 (56.5)	17.1 (62.8)	19.0 (66.2)	18.1 (64.6)	13.6 (56.5)	7.7 (45.9)	1.1 (34.0)	−4.7 (23.5)	7.5 (45.6)
Mean daily minimum °C (°F)	−12.1 (10.2)	−8.4 (16.9)	−2.5 (27.5)	3.1 (37.6)	7.3 (45.1)	11.1 (52.0)	13.3 (55.9)	12.9 (55.2)	9.0 (48.2)	2.6 (36.7)	−4.6 (23.7)	−10.6 (12.9)	1.8 (35.2)
Record low °C (°F)	−21.9 (−7.4)	−18.9 (−2.0)	−14.6 (5.7)	−7.9 (17.8)	−1.2 (29.8)	3.9 (39.0)	6.5 (43.7)	5.9 (42.6)	0.1 (32.2)	−7.5 (18.5)	−15.6 (3.9)	−21.1 (−6.0)	−21.9 (−7.4)
Average precipitation mm (inches)	1.1 (0.04)	1.3 (0.05)	5.2 (0.20)	15.1 (0.59)	42.9 (1.69)	52.4 (2.06)	72.8 (2.87)	68.3 (2.69)	53.6 (2.11)	20.6 (0.81)	2.9 (0.11)	0.7 (0.03)	336.9 (13.25)
Average precipitation days (≥ 0.1 mm)	2.1	2.3	3.8	5.5	10.2	13.1	13.5	12.4	12.4	7.2	2.5	1.6	86.6
Average snowy days	4.0	4.6	5.4	2.3	0.3	0	0	0	0.1	1.2	3.9	3.0	24.8
Average relative humidity (%)	45	43	42	42	50	56	61	63	67	62	52	48	53
Mean monthly sunshine hours	202.4	208.5	236.1	245.7	252.1	234.4	240.4	231.4	192.8	209.2	207.2	202.1	2,662.3
Percentage possible sunshine	65	67	63	62	58	54	54	56	53	61	68	68	61
Source: China Meteorological Administration

== Transportation ==
The district is served by two train stations: the Ping'anyi railway station, and the Haidong West railway station. The Ping'anyi railway station was first built in 1959 and is operated by the China Railway Qingzang Group. The station is situated on the Lanzhou–Qinghai railway. The Haidong West railway station is situated on the Lanzhou–Xinjiang high-speed railway.

National Highway 109 also runs through the district.

== See also ==
- List of administrative divisions of Qinghai
- Taktser, a village in Ping'an District
