= Feng Youlan =

Chinese philosopher and historian (1895–1990)

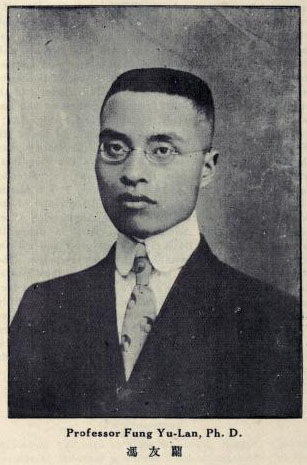
- Born: 4 December 1895; Bi village Tanghe County, Henan, Qing China
- Died: 26 November 1990 (aged 94); Beijing, People's Republic of China
- Education: Peking University; Columbia University
- Occupation: Philosopher
- Known for: Revival of Neo-Confucianism, synthesis of Western and Chinese philosophy
- Children: Zong Pu

Chinese name
- Traditional Chinese: 馮友蘭
- Simplified Chinese: 冯友兰
Transcriptions
Standard Mandarin
- Hanyu Pinyin: Féng Yǒulán
- Wade–Giles: Feng Yu-lan
- IPA: [fə̌ŋ jòʊlǎn]

Feng Youlan (Chinese: 馮友蘭; Wade–Giles: Feng Yu-lan; 4 December 1895 – 26 November 1990) was a Chinese philosopher, historian, and writer who was instrumental for reintroducing the study of Chinese philosophy in the modern era. In early scholarship he was published and discussed under the Wade-Giles name 'Fung Yu-lan', as used in the Bodde translation of A History of Chinese Philosophy and the work of Wing-tsit Chan. His works still saw republication under this name at the end of the century.

== Early life, education and career ==
Feng Youlan was born on 4 December 1895 in Tanghe County, Nanyang, Henan, China, to a middle-class family. His younger sister was Feng Yuanjun, who would become a famous Chinese writer. He studied philosophy in the China Public School in Shanghai, between 1912 and 1915, a preparatory school for college, then studied in Chunghua University, Wuhan (later merged into Central China Normal University) and Peking University between 1915 and 1918, where he was able to study Western philosophy and logic as well as Chinese philosophy.

Upon his graduation in 1918, he traveled to the United States in 1919, where he studied at Columbia University on the Boxer Indemnity Scholarship Program. There he met, among many philosophers who were to influence his thought and career, John Dewey, the pragmatist, who became his teacher. Feng gained his PhD from Columbia in 1923. His PhD thesis was titled "A Comparative Study of Life Ideals".

He went on to teach at Chinese universities including Jinan University, Yenching University, and Tsinghua University in Beijing. From 1934 to 1938 (and again from 1946 to 1949) he was Chair of the Department of Philosophy at Tsinghua. It was while at Tsinghua that Feng published what was to be his best-known and most influential work, his History of Chinese Philosophy (1934, in two volumes). In it he presented and examined the history of Chinese philosophy from a viewpoint which was very much influenced by the Western philosophical fashions prevalent at the time, which resulted in what Peter J. King of Oxford describes as a distinctly positivist tinge to most of the philosophers he described. Nevertheless, the book became the standard work in its field, and had a huge effect in reigniting an interest in Chinese thought.

In 1935 Feng, on his way to a conference in Prague, stopped briefly in the Soviet Union and was impressed with the radical social changes and cultural ferment. His speeches extolling the utopian possibilities of communism, although also describing the mistakes he saw, drew attention from Chiang Kai-sheks's police. Feng was arrested and spent a short time in jail, but soon became a firm supporter of the government and its resistance to Japan. During the Sino-Japanese War he published works which supported the New Life Movement for revitalizing Confucian values.

In 1939, Feng brought out his Xin Lixue (New Rational Philosophy, or Neo-Lixue). Lixue was a philosophical position of an important group of twelfth-century neo-Confucianists (including Cheng Yi and Zhu Xi); Feng's book took certain metaphysical notions from their thought and from taoism (such as li and tao), analyzed and developed them in ways that owed much to the Western philosophical tradition, and produced a rationalistic neo-Confucian metaphysics. He also developed, in the same way, an account of the nature of morality and of the structure of human moral development.

== War and upheaval ==
When the Second Sino-Japanese War broke out, the students and staff of Beijing's Tsinghua and Peking Universities, together with Tianjin's Nankai University, fled their campuses. They went first to Hengshan, where they set up the Changsha Temporary University, and then to Kunming, where they set up Southwest Associated University. When, in 1946 the three Universities returned to Beijing, Feng instead went to the U.S. again, this time to take up a post as visiting professor at the University of Pennsylvania. He spent the year 1948–1949 as a visiting professor at the University of Hawaii. He served as President of Tsinghua University from December 1948 to May 1949 because of Zhang Dongsun's refusal (it was known as National Tsinghua University until January 1949).

While he was at Pennsylvania, news from China made it clear that the communists were on their way to seizing power. Feng's friends tried to persuade him to stay, but he was determined to return; his political views were broadly socialist, and he thus felt optimistic about China's future under its new government.

Once back home, Feng began to study Marxist–Leninist thought, but he soon found that the political situation fell short of his hopes; by the mid-1950s his philosophical approach was being attacked by the authorities. He was forced to repudiate much of his earlier work, and to rewrite the rest – including his History – in order to fit in with the ideas of the Cultural revolution.

Despite all this, Feng refused to leave China, and after enduring much hardship he finally saw a relaxation of censorship, and was able to write with a certain degree of freedom. He died on 26 November 1990 in Beijing.

== Bibliography ==
=== Monographs and collections of essays ===
- 1934: A History of Chinese Philosophy
  - 1983: translated by Derk Bodde (Princeton, NJ: Princeton University Press) ISBN 0-691-02021-3
  - 1948: A Short History of Chinese Philosophy (Collier-Macmillan) — reprinted 1997: Free Press ISBN 0-684-83634-3
- 1939: Xin Li-xue (New Rational Philosophy) (Changsha: Commercial Press)
- Selected Philosophical Writings of Fung Yu-lan (Beijing: Foreign Language Press) ISBN 7-119-01063-8
- Xin yuan ren (A New Treatise on the Nature of Man) (Chongqing: Commercial Press)
- 1946: Xin zhi yan (A New Understanding of Words) (Shanghai: Commercial Press)
  - 1997: A New Treatise on the Methodology of Metaphysics (Beijing: Foreign Languages Press) ISBN 7-119-01947-3
- 1947: The Spirit of Chinese Philosophy transl. E.R. Hughes (London: Kegan Paul)
  - 1970: (Greenwood Press) ISBN 0-8371-2816-1
- 1961: Xin yuan dao (A New Treatise on the Nature of Tao) (Hong Kong: Zhong-guo zhe-xue jan jiu hui)
- 1986: A New History of Chinese Philosophy (Beijing: Renmin Press)

=== As translator ===
- 1933: Chuang-tzu: A New Selected Translation with an Exposition of the Philosophy of Kuo Hsiang (Shanghai)
  - 1991: A Taoist Classic: Chuang-Tzu (Beijing: Foreign Languages Press) ISBN 7-119-00104-3

=== Secondary ===
- 2004: Peter J. King One Hundred Philosophers (Hove: Apple) ISBN 1-84092-462-4
- 2001: Francis Soo "Contemporary Chinese Philosophy", in Brian Carr & Indira Mahalingam [edd] Companion Encyclopedia of Asian Philosophy (London: Routledge) ISBN 0-415-24038-7
