= Tan Xiaolin =

Chinese composer

- Traditional Chinese: 譚小麟
- Simplified Chinese: 谭小麟
Transcriptions
Standard Mandarin
- Hanyu Pinyin: Tán Xiǎolín
- Wade–Giles: T'an Hsiao-lin
- Yale Romanization: Tán Syǎu-Lín

Tan Xiaolin (Chinese: 谭小麟; pinyin: Tán Xiǎolín; Wade–Giles: T'an Hsiao-lin; April 25, 1911 – August 1, 1948) was a Chinese composer.

He was born in Shanghai to parents from Kaiping, Guangdong. He composed works for Chinese instruments and several art songs while studying music theory and the pipa at the Shanghai Conservatory. In 1939, he traveled to the United States, where he did further studies at Oberlin College and at Yale, where he studied with Paul Hindemith. He won a John Day Jackson scholarship with his string trio (1945). He returned to Shanghai in 1946 to teach at the Conservatory, where he headed the Theory and Composition department. His pupils include Qu Xixian, Chen Peixun and Sang Tong. He died on August 1, 1948 in a Shanghai hospital when he was only 37 years old.

Most of Tan's works in the Western classical music style are art songs and chamber works. His later pieces show the influence of Hindemith and his interest in aspects of neoclassicism, which he sought to reconcile with elements of the Chinese tradition. Some of his songs are published in Tan Xiaolin gequ xuanji (A selection of songs by Tan) (Beijing, 1982). Tan is regarded as one of the pioneers of modern art music in China.
