= Tonghe Township =

Tonghe Township 桐河乡
- Township
- Location in Henan
- Coordinates: 32°53′59″N 112°45′59″E
- Country: People's Republic of China
- Province: Henan
- Prefecture-level city: Nanyang
- County: Tanghe County
- Time zone: UTC+8 (China Standard)

Tonghe Township (Chinese: 桐河乡; pinyin: Tónghé Xiāng) is a township of Tanghe County, Henan province, China. As of 2020, it has 20 villages under its administration:

- Tongyi (Tong First) Village (桐一村)
- Tong'er (Tong Second) Village (桐二村)
- Tongsan (Tong Third) Village (桐三村)
- Tongsi (Tong Fourth) Village (桐四村)
- Chenzhuang Village (陈庄村)
- Liying Village (李营村)
- Fanying Village (范营村)
- Qiuzhuang Village (邱庄村)
- Wuzhuang Village (吴庄村)
- Shenlaojia Village (申老家村)
- Guanyuan Village (官园村)
- Yanhe Village (砚河村)
- Xiaoguozhuang Village (小郭庄村)
- Gengzhuang Village (耿庄村)
- Daguozhuang Village (大郭庄村)
- Shenqiao Village (沈桥村)
- Nianzhuang Village (年庄村)
- Qinghezhuang Village (清河庄村)
- Lisizhuang Village (李司庄村)
- Liuhuo Village (刘伙村)

== See also ==
- List of township-level divisions of Henan
