= Qu Xixian =

Chinese composer

Qu Xixian (23 September 1919 – 19 March 2008) was a Chinese composer. She was born in Shanghai and graduated from Shanghai National Conservatory of Music in 1948 with degrees in composition and piano. She had a full, eventful career that spanned several eras of important Chinese history. She worked with the Central Philharmonic Society and held several leadership positions on the board of the Chinese Musicians' Association. Her choral works were performed in 1997, 1999 and 2000 in Beijing and Shanghai.

== Early life and education ==
Xixian was born to parents Qu Baowen and Zhu Pingyu on September 23, 1919 in Shanghai. She loved music from a very young age, and began her formal music education during her childhood. In 1939, Xixian studied with German-Jewish composer, Wolfgang Fraenkel while he was living in Shanghai. Fraenkel had a profound influence on Xixian, as well as other prominent Chinese composers such as Ding Shande and Sang Tong.

From 1940 to 1948, Xixian studied piano and composition at the Shanghai National Conservatory. Among her many teachers was Tan Xiaolin, a former pupil of Paul Hindemith, before his return to the United States in 1944. Shortly after graduating from the composition department of the Shanghai National Conservatory in 1948, Xixian began to teach harmony and music history at the Beijing Art Institute, now called Beijing Opera Arts College.

== Composition career ==
In 1949 Xixian began to compose professionally. She wrote original scores for the Central Song and Dance Ensemble (which became the Central National Music Ensemble) from 1949 to 1954. Consequently, she composed for the Central Philharmonic Society (1954-unknown).

A large portion of Xixian's compositions are vocal pieces. She was particularly interested in choral writing and her unconventional use of diverse vocal timbres resulted in unique and innovative work. She became musically renowned for her beloved choral arrangements of Chinese folk songs. For example, her most famous piece “Pastoral” (Mu Ge) is a four-part vocal work based on the Dongmeng (Zhaowuda League, Inner Mongolia) folk song “Throwing Sticks.” In this piece, Xixian employs Western tonality and harmonically-driven melodies in conjunction with polyphonic interweaving. In 2010, the work was performed by Peiyang Chorus and can be viewed.

Xixian had given personal concerts of choral works in 1987, 1999, and 2000 in Beijing and Shanghai; had published Qu Xixian Chorus Selections in 2003, including 53 pieces, among which were arrangements of Pastoral, Usuli Bacarole, Clouds Flying Over the Unmoving Sky, and original compositions: Flying Petals, Call Me By My Pet Name, The Cuckoos are Singing, etc. Many of her works are still being performed in the 21st century. Xixian published C.D. and cassette entitled Flying Petals including 16 chorus works in 1995. Many of her works are still being performed in the 21st century.

== Works ==
=== Choral works ===
- Pastoral (1954)
- Listening to Mother Talking of the Past (1957) - (lyrics by Guan Hua) First Prize in 1980 Children's Song Contest. Chinese NCPA Chorus
- Cantata of the Red Army Base (1958)
- The Rickshaw Boy (1982)
- Call Me By My Pet Name (1985)
- We and You (1987) - First Prize Children's Song Contest
- The Flying Petals (1988) - First Prize Teacher's Song Contest. Performance by Peiyong Chorus.
- Releasing Pigeons at the Great Wall (1992) - First Prize Children's Song Contest

=== Film scores ===
- Song of Youth (1959)
- Music of the Red Flag (1960)
- Xiangzi the Camel (1981)

== Leadership positions ==
Throughout her life, Xixian was involved as a composer and administrator for several elite music societies and organizations. In 1979 she was elected as the Director of the Chinese Musicians' Association. A few years later, in 1985, she became the Vice President.

== Political involvement ==
A great deal of Xixian's compositional work reflects various historical periods she lived through in China, such as New China, the Cultural Revolution and the Reform Era. Along with several other Chinese artists in the 1950s, Xixian used composition to participate in protesting their government's plan to control social messages in music. Many songs that were written by this generation of Chinese musicians are still sung in the 21st century. Xixian's song in particular was quite positive and celebratory, entitled “Quan Shijie Renmin Xin Yi Tiao” which translates to “All The World’s People Are of the Same Mind.”

Many of her compositions were inspired by folkloric stories or by what she observed of the world around her. Particularly, a few of her songs reflected the challenges and struggles faced by the Chinese lower class. For example, The Rickshaw Boy was inspired by the novel Rickshaw Boy written by Lao She, detailing the life of an impoverished boy who supports himself by towing a rickshaw.

== Personal life ==
Beyond her musical career, Xixian's interest in socio-political developed throughout her entire life. At the age of 18, Xixian left Shanghai and travelled to Hunan to participate in anti-Japanese rioting that occurred there in 1937. Toward the end of her life, Xixian greatly suffered from lung cancer. She believed that China should pass a “Right to Die” law, stating that “A good death is better than living with pain." On March 19, 2008, she died from lung cancer at the age of 89. While she was alive, her interests included reading and socializing with her friends.

== Family ==
- Ex-husband: Zhao Fusan

== See also ==
- Chan Hing-yan
