= Chen Peixun =

Chinese composer

Chen Peixun or Chan Pui-fang (Chinese: 陳培勳; Chinese: 陈培勋; December 7, 1921 – February 25, 2007) was a Chinese composer.

Born in Hong Kong, he studied piano, organ and composition in HK and Shanghai. His teachers include Tan Xiaolin, a pupil of Paul Hindemith. He taught at the Central Music Conservatory in Beijing after 1949.

Chen made important contribution to the Chinese symphonic music of the 20th century. He composed three symphonies. No. 1 is called My Motherland, the first movement of which, entitled Aria of Snow, was used in the video game Civilization V. No. 2 is entitled Qingming Ji (Rites of Qingming). No. 3 is entitled Mei Song Zan (Ode to Plums and Pines).

Some of his piano works are also very popular with Chinese pianists. Frequently played are Hantian Lei (Thunder in Dryness) and Mai Zahuo (The Street Vendor), arranged from Cantonese folk melodies.

In 2007, Chen Peixun died in Shenzhen.
