= A Short History of Chinese Philosophy =

- First Edition (English)
- Editor: Derk Bodde
- Author: Feng Youlan
- Original title: 中國哲學簡史; Zhōngguó zhéxué jiǎnshǐ
- Language: English
- Subject: Chinese philosophy
- Publisher: Macmillan Inc.
- Publication date: 1948
- ISBN: 978-0-684-83634-8
- Preceded by: A History of Chinese Philosophy

A Short History of Chinese Philosophy (simplified Chinese: 中国哲学简史; traditional Chinese: 中國哲學簡史; pinyin: Zhōngguó zhéxué jiǎnshǐ) is a book by Feng Youlan written in 1948. It is a short version of his classic 1934 book A History of Chinese Philosophy.

== See also ==
- Chinese philosophy
