= Gucheng Township, Qinghai =

Gucheng Township 古城乡
- Township
- Location in Qinghai
- Coordinates: 36°21′14″N 102°0′8″E
- Country: China
- Province: Qinghai
- Prefecture-level city: Haidong
- District: Ping'an

Area
  - Total: 94.76 km^{2} (36.59 sq mi)

Population (2010)
  - Total: 8,650
  - Density: 91.3/km^{2} (236/sq mi)
- Time zone: UTC+8 (China Standard)
- Local dialing code: 972

Gucheng Township (simplified Chinese: 古城乡; traditional Chinese: 古城鄉; pinyin: Gǔchéng Xiāng) is a township in Ping'an District, Haidong, Qinghai, China. In 2010, Gucheng Township had a total population of 8,650: 4,470 males and 4,180 females: 2,017 aged under 14, 5,950 aged between 15 and 65 and 683 aged over 65.

== Administrative divisions ==
Gucheng Township administers the following 14 administrative villages:

- Gucheng Village (Chinese: 古城村)
- Zongmen Village (Chinese: 总门村)
- Beicun Village (Chinese: 北村村)
- Shaka Village (Chinese: 沙卡村)
- Muchang Village (Chinese: 木场村)
- Qie'erfu Village (Chinese: 且尔甫村)
- Shancheng Village (Chinese: 山城村)
- Pailougou Village (Chinese: 牌楼沟村)
- Xinzhuang'er Village (Chinese: 新庄尔村)
- Jiaojia Village (Chinese: 角加村)
- Zhamen Village (Chinese: 扎门村)
- Shibi Village (Chinese: 石壁村)
- Liutai Village (Chinese: 六台村)
- Heilintan Village (Chinese: 黑林滩村)
