= Hongya Cave =

Building complex in Chongqing, China

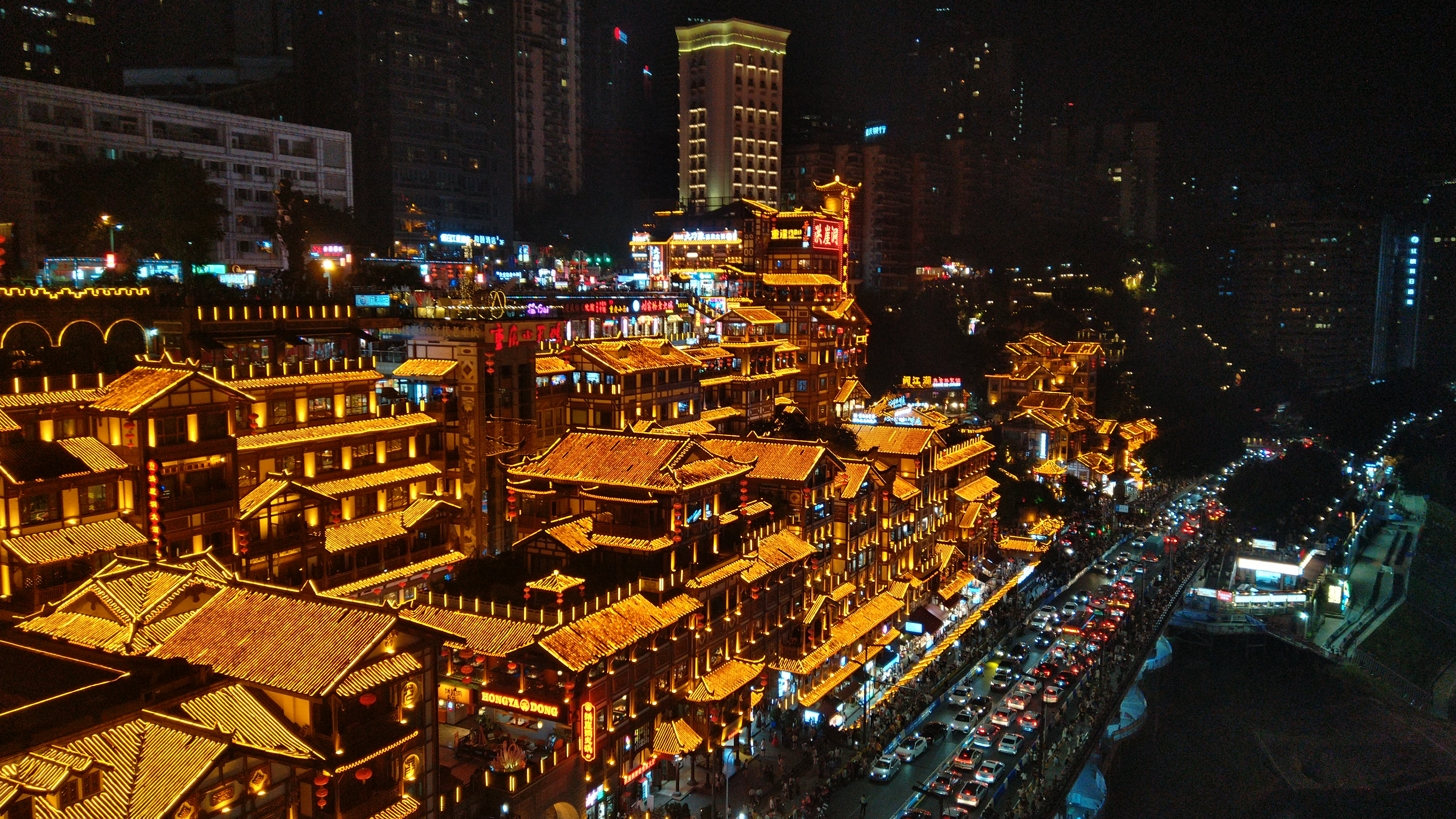
Hongya Cave at night as seen from Qiansimen Bridge

Hongya Cave, also known as Hongya Dong (Chinese: 洪崖洞; pinyin: hóng yá dòng; lit. 'cave of the flooded cliff') is an 11-story stilt-building complex in the main commercial district of Jiefangbei in the city of Chongqing, China. It comprises a series of structures built into the hillside along the southern bank of the Jialing River, and is one of the most popular tourist attractions in the city.

The complex consists of retail spaces and hotels. The fourth floor of Hongyadong consists of a food market, and is notable for spice stores where mala are especially noted. The top floor of the complex lies a viewing platform where the Jialing can be observed. The complex's appearance has been compared to that of the prominent building in 2001 Japanese animated film Spirited Away.

== History ==
The complex is believed to have functioned as a fortress from the time of the ancient Ba State (1046 B.C. - 256 B.C) through the end of the Qing dynasty. Its history can be traced back to the Hongyang Gate, dated from the 14th century during the early Ming dynasty. It was noted for its beauty in 1750; a waterfall flowed through the natural cave and there were inscriptions and sculptures carved into the walls. By 1939, there was a large temple in the cave that sold wine. Stilt houses (diaojiaolou) were built along the river bank and were populated until 1949 as shipping industry declined and the diaojiaolou were left in disrepair before getting torn down from 2005 onwards by the local government. Newer buildings in the style of bayu diaojiaolou were built in place. Construction of the new complex alongside preservation began in 2006 and was led by Shenzhen Huazhu Architectural & Engineering Design.
