= Shihuiyao Township, Qinghai =

Shihuiyao Township 石灰窑乡
- Township
- Location in Qinghai
- Coordinates: 36°23′1″N 101°53′44″E
- Country: China
- Province: Qinghai
- Prefecture-level city: Haidong
- District: Ping'an

Area
  - Total: 74.25 km^{2} (28.67 sq mi)

Population (2010)
  - Total: 4,849
  - Density: 65.31/km^{2} (169.1/sq mi)
- Time zone: UTC+8 (China Standard)
- Local dialing code: 972

Shihuiyao Township (simplified Chinese: 石灰窑乡; traditional Chinese: 石灰窯鄉; pinyin: Shíhuīyáo Xiāng) is a township in Ping'an District, Haidong, Qinghai, China. In 2010, Shihuiyao Township had a total population of 4,849: 2,427 males and 2,377 females: 1,111 aged under 14, 3,311 aged between 15 and 65 and 427 aged over 65.

== Administrative divisions ==
Shihuiyao Township administers the following 14 administrative villages:

- Shihuiyao Township (Chinese: 石灰窑村)
- Yima Village (Chinese: 宜麻村)
- Yelong Village (Chinese: 业隆村)
- Liming Village (Chinese: 黎明村)
- Yangposhan Village (Chinese: 阳坡山村)
- Yaozhuang Village (Chinese: 窑庄村)
- Chuchugou Village (Chinese: 处处沟村)
- Hongya Village (Chinese: 红崖村)
- Xiahetan Village (Chinese: 下河滩村)
- Tanglongtai Village (Chinese: 唐隆台村)
- Shangtanglong Village (Chinese: 上唐隆村)
- Shangfatai Village (Chinese: 上法台村)
- Xiafatai Village (Chinese: 下法台村)
- Shiguasi Village (Chinese: 石卦寺)
