= International Tibet Independence Movement =

Non-profit organisation

- Formation: 1995
- Type: 501(c)(3)
- Legal status: Non-profit organization
- Purpose: Tibetan independence, human rights in Tibet
- President: Benjamin Cox
- Main organ: Board of directors
- Website: http://rangzen.org
- Remarks: Rangzen means independence

The International Tibet Independence Movement (ITIM) is a nonprofit organization, founded on 18 March 1995, that supports Tibetan independence from the People's Republic of China:

"only independence for Tibet can ensure the survival of the Tibetan land and its people, culture, and religion."

ITIM was founded and is based in the city of Fishers, Indiana, in the United States.

== History ==
The International Tibet Independence Movement, was founded in 1995 by Thubten Jigme Norbu, brother of the 14th Dalai Lama, and Larry Gerstein. The organization protested against the PRC in San Francisco during the 2008 Summer Olympics and supported calls for the boycotting of the Olympics. The group has organized numerous "March for Tibet's Independence" events, in Washington, D.C., Indiana, Florida and elsewhere.

== See also ==
- Annexation of Tibet by the People's Republic of China
- Central Tibetan Administration (government-in-exile)
- Tibetan independence movement
