= Derk Bodde =

American academic and sinologist (1909–2003)

- Born: March 9, 1909; Marshfield, Massachusetts, United States
- Died: November 3, 2003 (aged 94); Philadelphia, Pennsylvania, United States

Academic background
- Education: Harvard University (BA); Leiden University (PhD)

Academic work
- Discipline: Chinese history Sinology
- Institutions: University of Pennsylvania

Derk Bodde (March 9, 1909 – November 3, 2003) was an American sinologist and historian of China known for his pioneering work on the history of the Chinese legal system.

Bodde received his undergraduate degree from Harvard University in 1930. He spent six years (1931–1937) studying in China on a fellowship. He earned a doctorate in Chinese Studies from the University of Leiden on March 3, 1938. When the Fulbright scholarship program was initiated in 1948, Bodde was the first American recipient of a one-year fellowship, which he spent studying in Beijing.

He spent several decades as Professor of Chinese Studies at the University of Pennsylvania, and was a president of the American Oriental Society (1968–69). He was a member of both the American Academy of Arts and Sciences and the American Philosophical Society.

== Honors ==
- Association for Asian Studies (AAS), 1985 Award for Distinguished Contributions to Asian Studies

== See also ==
- William P. Alford: current Harvard University scholar of Chinese law
- Jerome A. Cohen: current New York University scholar (emeritus) of Chinese law
- List of Sinologists
