= Taktser =

Village in eastern Qinghai, China

Taktser 红崖村 Dagcêr Hongya
- Village
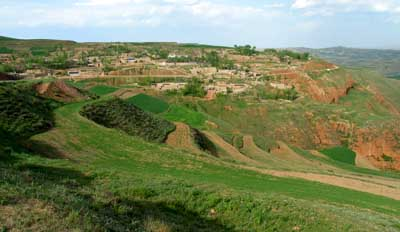
- View of the village of Taktser

- Location in Qinghai Location in China
- Coordinates: 36°22′41.1″N 101°51′57.2″E
- Country: People's Republic of China
- Province: Qinghai
- Prefecture-level city: Haidong
- District: Ping'an
- Township: Shihuiyao Township, Qinghai
- Elevation: 2,843 m (9,327 ft)

Population (2009)
  - Total: 256
- Time zone: UTC+8 (Tibet Standard Time)

Taktser (Tibetan: སྟག་འཚེར།, ZWPY: Dagcêr; meaning 'Place on the Heights'") or Hongya Village (Chinese: 红崖村; pinyin: Hóngyá Cūn; lit. 'Redcliff Village') is a village in Shihuiyao Township, Ping'an District, Haidong, in the east of Qinghai province, China (also known as Amdo or Kokonor). Tibetan, Han and Hui Chinese people populate the village which is notable as the birthplace of the 14th Dalai Lama, Tenzin Gyatso.

Taktser was originally an area of pasture land for the larger village of Balangtsa, about two hours walk away in the valley. Cattle were brought to feed on the fertile grazing lands in summer, which caused them to give very rich milk. Later, when people realized that this was also a good place to farm, permanent houses were built, and the village comprised about thirty cottages by the time Tenzin Gyatso was born in 1935.

The village is on the route from Xining, which was the seat of local Chinese government administration, to Labrang Tashi Khyi, the largest monastery in the area after the famous Kumbum Monastery.

Taktser is the original Tibetan name of Hongya Village (红崖村; Hóngyá Cūn, Hongaizi in the local dialect), together with 13 other villages forming the Shihuiyao Township (石灰窑乡), of Ping'an County, in Haidong Prefecture.

The brother of the 14th Dalai Lama Gyalo Thondup said that in 1710, a large part of Amdo had been incorporated into the Manchu empire as part of the region now known as Qinghai. He also said that people speak a mixture of Tibetan and Qinghai Chinese language. China-based Tibet researcher Wang Xiaobin claims that at the end of the Ming Dynasty, many people spoke Chinese.

Taktser is not, as it is usually taken to be, in the proximity of the Kumbum Monastery, rather it is approximately 27 kilometres (17 mi) east of the monastery, and around 26 kilometres (16 mi) southwest of the town of Ping'an (Chinese: 平安镇, Tibetan: Bayan khar), which is also the seat of the government for the county of the same name.

== Population ==
Although the name of Taktser is a reminder of the times when the earliest inhabitants were Tibetan tribes, the Huis have been the main ethnic group in the area since the Qing Dynasty (1644).

The village of Taktser became religiously linked to the Kumbum Jampa Ling Monastery. "The Taktser incarnation line was initiated when Yeshe Kelzang was recognized as the reincarnation of Lobzang Dorje, an abbot of the tantric college at Kumbum Monastery, who was then posthumously known as the First Taktser, The name of the incarnation line stems from the town of Taktser in Amdo where the Lobzang Dorje was born. The seat of this incarnation line is at Kumbum. The Fifth Taktser, Lobzang Tsultrim Jigme Gyatso was a contemporary of the Thirteenth Dalai Lama, and together they worked to improve the administration of Kumbum. The Sixth Taktser, Tubten Jigme Norbu, was the brother of the Fourteenth Dalai Lama. He died in 2008 in Indiana..."

A notable citizen, "Lobzang Dorje (blo bzang rdo rje) was born in Chikyā Taktse (chi kyA stag mtsher) Village near Kumbum Jampa Ling (sku 'bum byams pa gling) Monastery some time in the seventeenth century. He was educated at Kumbum Monastery, where he served first as the eighth abbot of the Tantric College (rgyud pa grwa tshang), and then, in 1691, as the seventeenth throne holder of the monastery, a post he held for five years. During his tenure, in 1692, the Tsenkhang (btsan khang), the temple dedicated to propitiating the tsen (btsan) spirit, was constructed..."

In the last quarter of the nineteenth century, Qing empire troops destroyed the Taktser village. "Manchu troops burned down every house in Taktser village, driving the entire population to seek refuge in caves in the surrounding hills. The Manchu's attempts to smoke them out with burning chili were unsuccessful..."

In 1935, the village, then under the control of Hui people (Muslim) warlord Ma Bufang of the Republic of China (Ma clique), consisted of 17 households, 15 of which were Tibetan. In 1985, there were 40 families and in 2002 the figure rose to 50.

In 2009, the village numbered 256 inhabitants (45 families). Over 70 percent of the 45 families have a television set and a land-line telephone. The village also features 10 mobile phones, 16 motorbikes, and one automobile, but is still isolated from the Internet.

== Birthplace of the 14th Dalai Lama ==
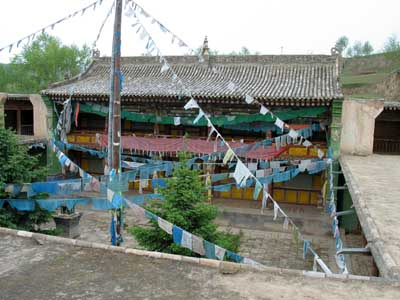
House where the 14th Dalai Lama was born

The village of Taktser gained fame as the birthplace of the 14th Dalai Lama in 1935. It also saw the birth of his elder brother, Thubten Jigme Norbu, who was acknowledged by the 13th Dalai Lama as the reincarnation of the great lama Taktser Rinpoche. In 2018, the house has reportedly been renovated and is monitored by the Chinese Communist Party.

In her book Dalai Lama, My Son: A Mother's Story, published in 2000, the 14th Dalai Lama's mother, Diki Tsering, reports on the cursory description that the 5th Reting Rinpoche gave of her household after seeing it in a vision: "there was a tree in the back yard and a stupa (...) at the doorway and (...) we had a small black-and-white dog and a large mastiff on the terrace (...), there were many nationalities in our home.".

In 1954, the Austrian mountaineer Heinrich Harrer, who had the opportunity of speaking to Dzasa Kunsangtse, one of the monk investigators sent to look for the 13th Dalai Lama's reincarnation, describes the house as "a little Chinese peasant house with carved gables.".

Michael Harris Goodman portrayed the house as "typically Tibetan: a single-storied rectangular structure with a broad, flat roof situated around a paved courtyard with no windows in the outside walls. In the center of the yard was a round stone base supporting a tall wooden mast from which fluttered a banner of white cotton bearing hundreds of block-printed prayers."

To find a more substantial description of the house, one has to turn the biography, published in 1959, of the Dalai Lama's elder brother, Thubten Jigme Norbu. In it the exterior appearance and interior arrangement of the house are depicted in minute detail.

The house was a rectangular, ground-level building, with its various parts arranged around a wide central courtyard. It had a rectangular flat roof. There were no openings in the outside walls, except for the doorway. In the roof there were three chimneys stacks and two air-holes. Around the roof were small gutters with spouts giving out into the courtyard. Over the entrance there was a socket fixed in the roof to take a 10-foot-high flagpole. The flag itself was inscribed with innumerable prayers.

The house was entered from the east side as this was the only side that afforded protection from the weather. A wide corridor led into the yard. To the right was the kitchen, which took up almost the whole eastern wing. In the northern wing was the best room, the altar room and the bedroom of the Dalai Lama's parents, all connected with each other. The byre, the guest room and the store room were in the western wing, while the stable, the kennel and the sheep-pen were in the southern wing. The yard, the covered in-way and the stalls were paved with stone slabs. The rooms had wooden floors.

A more recent account of the home comes from Rudy Kong in Dragons, Donkeys, and Dust: Memoirs from a decade in China, published in 2010. Kong visited the home in 2001 and described "a living room of bare concrete that contained nothing more than simple wooden furniture. On the tables and walls were old black and white family photos. In the photos we could see the young child Tenzin Gyatso, who would be pronounced an incarnation of Buddha himself and become the God-King of the Tibetans: the Dalai Lama."

== Monastery of the 4th Karmapa ==
Shadzong Ritro monastery before destruction by the Communist Chinese

Standing on a mountain peak 7 km from Taktser, the monastery of Shadzong Ritro was founded by the 4th Karmapa (1340–1383) at the beginning of the 14th century. It is in this monastery that the 4th Karmapa conferred the first vows to Tsongkhapa (1357–1419). At the time of this ceremony, the Karmapa cut a wick of hair of the child, then sent it on a close boulder of the cave where he lived, creating a crack in the rock. A Juniper exhaling an odor of human hair and still visible these days would have grown from it. At the time of his return from China, the 13th Dalai Lama, stayed for a while in this monastery, finding the place magnificent, and gazing at the house of his next reincarnation, a detail the monks remembered.

According to Thubten Jigme Norbu, in 1949, by the end of the Chinese Civil War, plundering hordes controlled by the Communists, robbed and destroyed what they could not take, burning the buildings of Shadzong Ritro.

== Climate ==
Located at 2,843 m (9,327 ft) above sea level, Taktser has an elevation-influenced dry-winter subarctic climate (Köppen climate classification: Dwc) with long, very cold winters and short, fresh summers. Taktser experiences large diurnal temperature variations, especially in winter months. January has a 16.3 °C (29.3 °F) difference between the average high and low temperatures.

Climate data for Taktser
Month	Jan	Feb	Mar	Apr	May	Jun	Jul	Aug	Sep	Oct	Nov	Dec	Year
Mean daily maximum °C (°F)	−1.4 (29.5)	1.0 (33.8)	6.2 (43.2)	11.3 (52.3)	14.9 (58.8)	17.7 (63.9)	19.7 (67.5)	19.3 (66.7)	14.6 (58.3)	10.2 (50.4)	4.2 (39.6)	0.0 (32.0)	9.8 (49.7)
Daily mean °C (°F)	−9.6 (14.7)	−6.7 (19.9)	−1.0 (30.2)	4.4 (39.9)	8.5 (47.3)	11.5 (52.7)	13.7 (56.7)	13.1 (55.6)	9.0 (48.2)	3.9 (39.0)	−2.8 (27.0)	−7.9 (17.8)	3.0 (37.4)
Mean daily minimum °C (°F)	−17.7 (0.1)	−14.4 (6.1)	−8.1 (17.4)	−2.5 (27.5)	2.1 (35.8)	5.4 (41.7)	7.8 (46.0)	7.0 (44.6)	3.5 (38.3)	−2.3 (27.9)	−9.8 (14.4)	−15.7 (3.7)	−3.7 (25.3)
Average precipitation mm (inches)	2 (0.1)	3 (0.1)	9 (0.4)	25 (1.0)	55 (2.2)	66 (2.6)	96 (3.8)	95 (3.7)	66 (2.6)	27 (1.1)	5 (0.2)	2 (0.1)	451 (17.9)
Source: Climate-Data.org
