= Sanguis Venenatus =

Elegy for strings by Andrew March

- by Andrew March
- English: Tainted blood
- Period: Contemporary classical music
- Genre: Music for strings
- Form: Ternary form
- Composed: 2009
- Recorded: 9 July 2011 Reduta Hall, Olomouc, Czech Republic
- Duration: 5:30
- Scoring: String orchestra

Premiere
- Date: 20 March 2010
- Location: Todmorden, West Yorkshire
- Conductor: Nicholas Concannon Hodges
- Performers: Todmorden Orchestra
- Written in memory of haemophiliacs who lost their lives due to contaminated blood

Sanguis Venenatus is an elegy for strings by English composer Andrew March written in memory of haemophiliacs (and others) affected by the Tainted Blood Scandal. The elegy was included in a service on 30 March 2011, at Westminster Abbey to commemorate the 40th anniversary of the enactment of the UK legislation – the Chronically Sick and Disabled Persons Act 1970. Sanguis Venenatus was dedicated to the late Lord Morris of Manchester, to recognise his long–standing support and advocacy for persons with haemophilia.

== Composition ==
In 2009, Andrew March completed a cycle of 10 string quartets based on the characteristics of diurnal birds of prey. The fifth piece, entitled Elegy for an Unsuspecting Phalarope was inspired by the image of a huge buzzard snatching a small grey wading bird. The photograph, which appeared in The Times on 16 January 2009, was taken by two birdwatchers, Paul Freestone and Tim Twiggs at St Gothian Sands in Cornwall. For March, this image became a poignant metaphor for the disaster which befell thousands of haemophiliacs who were treated with contaminated blood products. The quartet was subsequently reworked for the forces of a full string orchestra, after which the elegy was given the Latin title, Sanguis Venenatus; the closest possible rendering of ″Tainted Blood″.

The score, completed in 2009, bears the inscription: ″This work is dedicated to all the haemophiliacs and others who have lost their lives through contaminated blood and blood products.″ In the April 2013 edition of the European Haemophilia Consortium newsletter, the composer talked in personal terms about what motivated him to write the elegy:

It is difficult to express in words exactly how I felt at losing so many of my friends, other than to say I was wracked with grief. As a composer, this build–up of emotion had to go somewhere and it is my wish that in writing the elegy, I have managed to capture some of this strength of feeling.

== Recording ==
The piece was recorded in Reduta Hall, Olomouc, Czech Republic on 9 July 2011, by 50 string players from the Moravian Philharmonic under conductor, Petr Vronský. Sanguis Venenatus was released as the fourth track on the CD album Dimensions – Works for String Orchestra by Navona Records (NV5895) on 13 November 2012. The Dimensions album was reviewed in Gramophone in March 2013, where Donald Rosenberg said that Sanguis Venenatus was ″intensely felt″ and that the elegy was characterised by ″slow, aching lines and mild dissonances".

== Performances ==
The world première of Sanguis Venenatus was given on Saturday, 20 March 2010, at Todmorden Town Hall, by the strings of the Todmorden Orchestra under conductor Nicholas Concannon Hodges. The première was followed by positive review describing the one–movement elegy as a first–hand musical metaphor for thousands of haemophiliacs given contaminated blood. On Wednesday, 30 March 2011, the elegy received a second performance during a commemorative service at Westminster Abbey with the strings of the London Charity Orchestra under William Carslake. The service celebrated the 40th anniversary of the enactment of the Chronically Sick and Disabled Persons Act 1970.

== Broadcasts ==
The first known radio broadcast of Sanguis Venenatus was on WPRB 103.3 fm Princeton, New Jersey, on 28 November 2012. On 14 January 2013, Sanguis Venenatus was aired on South Africa's dedicated classical station, Classic FM 102.7, and the elegy has since appeared on their regular playlist. On 24 January 2013, Catalunya Ràdio, Barcelona, broadcast Sanguis Venenatus with a subtitle in the playlist describing the piece as "elegia per a orquestra de corda". On Monday, 25 February 2013, Sveriges Radio P2 gave the first broadcast of Sanguis Venenatus on 'P2 Klassiskt' in Sweden. The elegy subsequently became a regular feature of the P2 playlist. Sanguis Venenatus received its first radio broadcast in Hungary on Thursday, 16 January 2014, during a programme called "Ars Novo" on Budapest's dedicated classical station, MR3 Rádió Bartók.

Sanguis Venenatus was broadcast in the UK for the first time on 9 October 2015. The elegy was introduced by Verity Sharp on Late Junction on BBC Radio 3. In keeping with the 'tainted blood' theme, Sanguis Venenatus was broadcast on Canada′s Radio–Classique Québec on World AIDS Day, Friday, 1 December 2017.

== See also ==
- Contaminated blood scandal in the United Kingdom
- Marine – à travers les arbres (winning piece of the first Masterprize)
- R (March) v Secretary of State for Health (judicial review involving victims of contaminated blood products)
