= Andrew March =

English composer

Andrew Michael March
- Born: November 1973 (age 52); Nuneaton, Warwickshire, United Kingdom
- Education: Royal College of Music, London; King Edward VI College, Nuneaton; Higham Lane School, Nuneaton
- Occupation: Composer
- Known for: Marine—à travers les arbres
- Notable work: Selected Works List
- Website: Official Website

Andrew March is an English composer (born 1973). He was the winner of the first-ever Masterprize Composition Competition with his piece Marine — à travers les arbres. Andrew studied composition at the Royal College of Music with Jeremy Dale Roberts, graduating in 1996.

His compositions have received critical acclaim and have been recorded and performed by some of the world's most famous orchestras including the London Symphony Orchestra and the BBC Philharmonic.

== Career ==
March was the 1996 Royal Philharmonic Society Composition prize winner. In 1997, his symphonic poem Easdale was included on the Society for the Promotion of New Music (SPNM) shortlist.

Marine—à travers les arbres was featured at 1998's Proms, with the EUYO conducted by Vladimir Ashkenazy.

His composition "A Stirring in the Heavenlies", a commission awarded as a prize by The Musician's Company in 1998, was recorded by the Kyiv Philharmonic under composer/conductor Robert Ian Winstin for the 12–CD series "Masterworks of the New Era".

Sanguis Venenatus (2009) was an elegy written by March in memory of Haemophiliacs affected by the Tainted Blood Scandal. It was recorded by the Moravian Philharmonic with conductor Petr Vronský.

== Awards ==
- 1990 Flame of Youth Fanfare Competition (British Gas West Midlands)
- 1993 English Song Prize
- 1994 United Music Publishers' Prize
- 1995 Cobbett & Hurlstone Prize
- 1995 The Philip Morris Art Award (The Haemophilia Society)
- 1996 Royal Philharmonic Society Composition Prize
- 1996 Constant and Kit Lambert Award – (Musicians' Livery)
- 1998 Masterprize International Composing Competition
- 1998 Worshipful Company of Musicians Quincentenary Commission (Musicians' Livery)
- 2004 International Composition Competition to Honour the Greek Poet, Pindar

== Selected works ==
=== Orchestral ===
- Easdale (1996)
- Marine—à travers les arbres (1997)
- Irish Reel (2000)
- A Stirring in the Heavenlies (2000), commissioned by the Worshipful Company of Musicians
- Five Songs of Pindar (2003) for soprano, choir and orchestra
- Sanguis Venenatus (2009) for string orchestra, written in memory of haemophiliacs and others who lost their lives as a result of the Tainted Blood Scandal
- Cellular Automata Orchestral Suite (2009–13)

Gosper′s Glider Gun
The Infinite Hotel
Cloverleaf Period–4 Oscillator
Babbling Brook
Pond on Pond

- Amoration (2016) for piano and strings
- Piano Concerto No. 1 (2013–19)
- The Skylark (2021) for full orchestra and SSAA voices. Text: John Clare

=== Ensemble ===
- Flame of Youth Fanfare (1990) for brass ensemble of 12 players
- Nymphéas (1995) for 8 players
- Ten Little Pieces (1995) for 8 players
- Music for Film Credits (1996) for 9 players
- Adagio Assonnato (2000) for oboe, harp, strings
- Nymphéas for Clarinet Choir (2016)
- Elegy on Sudden Loss (2021) for string orchestra

=== Chamber and instrumental ===
- La Maison Blanche dans les Collines (1986) for string quartet
- Cornelyn (1986) for piano and strings
- Images of the Lake (1987) for solo flute
- Transient Moods (1992) for guitar solo
- Nymphèas for Two Pianos (2001), revised (2019)
- Alto Flute and Harp Book (2001)

Water Lilies with Kingma System quarter–tone alto flute ossia
XXIX—in perpetuum for solo Kingma System quarter–tone alto flute
Adagio Assonnato
Aeolian Rustling with Kingma System quarter–tone alto flute ossia
Dragonfly

- In Memoriam (2002) for Kingma System quarter–tone alto flute, marimba, vibraphone, harp and strings
- Equipoise (2005) for bass clarinet and piano
- String Quartet Cycle "Birds of Prey'' (2009)
- Irish Reel—Piano Transcription (2009) for piano solo
- Phoenix Trail (2010) for violin and piano
- Three Pieces for Solo Cello (2011)
- Solo Piano Album "14 pieces" (2014)
- Ephemeral Nymphs (2015) for cello and piano
- Dragonfly (2016) for flute, viola and harp
- Spring Tide Arabesque (2016) for bass clarinet duo
- Nightwind (2016) for flute, violin and cello
- Dragonfly (2017) for clarinet, bass clarinet and piano
- Seven Pieces (2017) for bass clarinet and piano
- Two Pieces (2017) for bass clarinet duo
- Pieces for Alto Saxophone and Piano (2019–2020)

Moonrise at Perigee (2019)
Nightshade (2020)
Romance (2020)

- Solitude (2020) for alto saxophone

=== Songs ===
- Boy in Ice (1992) for mezzo–soprano and piano. Text: Laurie Lee
- Invasion Summer (1993) for mezzo–soprano and 6 players. Text: Laurie Lee
- Black Edge (1993) for mezzo–soprano and 8 players. Text: Laurie Lee
- Poem I from "Chamber Music" (1996) for soprano and harp. Text: James Joyce
- Un Grand Sommeil Noir (2008) for baritone and piano. Text: Paul Verlaine
- Two Lovers (2009) for baritone and piano. Text: George Eliot

=== Choral ===
- Be Still and Know (2000)
- O Sing Unto the Lord (2000)
- The Grace (2003)
- Magnificat (2004)
- Spiritus (2004)
- Thou Art Worthy (2004)
- Nunc Dimittis "The Song of Simeon" (2004)
- Phos Hilaron "Song of the Light" (2004)
- Marian Antiphon No.3 "Regina Caeli" (2005)
- Marian Antiphon No.2 "Ave Regina Coelorum" (2005)
- 25 Choral Collects (2006); Text: Common Worship, Additional Collects
- May We Who Share His Table (2006)
- The Baptism of Christ (2006)
- Almighty God, you search us and you know us (2006)
- Creator of the Heavens "Choral Collect for Epiphany" (2006) Text: Common Worship, Additional Collects
- Psalm 57 (2007)
- Somnia (2007) Text: Petronius Arbiter; Translation: Helen Waddell
- How Long, O Lord? (2008)
- My Voice is Unto God (2008), with organ accompaniment
- May We Who Share His Table (2009) for SSA choir with piano accompaniment
- And It Shall Be (2010)
- De Profundis (2011), for SAATBB choir
- Spera in Domino "Psalm 36" (2012)
- Dixit Iniustus "Psalm 35" (2012)
- Dies Quoque "Day of Narrow Anguish" (2012)
- Ante Faciem Dei (2015)
- Your Eyes Fall Upon Us "Anthem for Remembrance" (2015); Text (adaptation): Sue Threakall
- Laudate Dominum (2015)
- Psalm 22 (2015) for SSATB choir
- Your Mercy, O Lord (2016) for SSAA choir with piano accompaniment
- Our God at Hand (2019)
- Lament (2021) for SSAATTBB choir

== Discography ==
- 1998 – Top of the World, Marine – à travers les arbres, London Symphony Orchestra, cond. Daniel Harding (March 1998, BBC Music Magazine: BBC MM67)
- 1998 – Masterprize Finalists, Marine – à travers les arbres, London Symphony Orchestra, cond. Daniel Harding (4 September 1998, EMI Debut Series: CDZ572826-2)
- 2005 – Masterworks of the New Era – Volume Seven, A Stirring in the Heavenlies, Kiev Philharmonic, cond. Robert Ian Winstin (28 November 2005, ERM Media: ERM-6709)
- 2007 – Masterworks of the New Era – Volume Eleven, Nymphéas, Kiev Philharmonic, cond. Robert Ian Winstin (1 September 2007, ERM Media: ERM-6811)
- 2007 – Regina Caeli, Nunc Dimittis; Magnificat; Be Still and Know; Spiritus etc., The Chapel Choir of Corpus Christi College, Cambridge, cond. Daniel Soper; Rebecca Drake, (26 October 2007, Lammas Records: LAMM188D)
- 2012 – Dimensions, Sanguis Venenatus, Moravian Philharmonic Strings, cond. Petr Vronský (13 November 2012, Navona Records: NV5895)
- 2013 – Moto Perpetuo, Three Pieces for Solo Cello, Ovidiu Marinescu (26 March 2013, Navona Records: NV5901)
- 2014 – As if to sleep, Elveden; Nosce Te Ipsum; Moonvine; Pavane; Homage; Night Vigil; Solus etc., pf. Andrew March (29 January 2014, Assonnato Records: ATO573201)
- 2016 – Amoration, F.A.M.E.'S. Macedonian Radio Symphonic Orchestra, cond. Oleg Kondratenko; pf. Marija Vrskova (18 March 2016, Assonnato Records: ATO573202)
- 2022 – Elegy on Sudden Loss (video), OpenSound Orchestra, cond. Stanislav Malyshev; (22 February 2022, Assonnato Records: ATO573203).
