= Candis Angelene =

South African singer

- Born: Candis Cheyne; July 21, 1975 (age 51)
- Occupations: Soloist, Performer
- Employer: Aaross Music
- Known for: Crossover Classical Music
- Height: 5 ft 7 in (170 cm)
- Title: Mrs
- Spouse: "Mark"
- Website: http://www.candisangelene.com/

Candis Angelene (born July 21, 1975) is a South African singer. Her debut album, Ancient Light, reached number 4 on the Classic FM (South Africa) chart.

== Discography ==
In 2009, Angelene launched her debut album Ancient Light. The album received rave reviews. The April 2010 issue of the South African Oprah Magazine said, "With its calm and soothing spirit, this album will be a welcome respite after a long day."

=== Ancient Light ===
Released: 2009
Number of Discs: 1

==== Track listing ====
1. Anthem of Courage
2. This is our Secret
3. Love of Our Own
4. For Eternity (Per l’Eternita’)
5. When all we have is Love
6. Running Free
7. They’re Shining for You
8. My Brother
9. The Lord’s my Shepherd
10. Coming Home
