= Victoria Borisova-Ollas =

Russian/Swedish composer

- Born: December 21, 1969 (age 56); Vladivostok Russia
- Citizenship: Sweden
- Education: Central School of Music, Moscow; Moscow State Tchaikovsky Conservatoire; Malmö Music College, Sweden; Royal College of Music, London
- Occupation: Composer
- Era: 20th century, Contemporary.
- Known for: Wings of the Wind awarded 2nd Prize in Masterprize International Composition Competition
- Notable work: Selected works list
- Website: Official website

Victoria Borisova-Ollas (born 21 December 1969) is a Russian-Swedish composer who first received international recognition for her symphonic poem Wings of the Wind which won second prize in the 1998 Masterprize International Composition Competition in the UK.

She was born in Vladivostok, and studied with Nikolai Korndorf at the Tchaikovsky Conservatory in Moscow and continued her studies in composition at the Academy of Music in Stockholm and Malmö Music College. In 1997, she studied composition with Jeremy Dale Roberts at the Royal College of Music in London.

She has composed two symphonies, Symphony No. 1 "The Triumph of Heaven" and Symphony No. 2 "Labyrinths of Time".

Her opera The Ground Beneath Her Feet, with a libretto written by Edward Kemp, is an adaptation of the novel of that name by Salman Rushdie. The premiere at Bridgewater Hall during the 2007 Manchester International Festival was narrated by Alan Rickman, conducted by Mark Elder, and featured a film component by Mike Figgis.

Since 2008 she has been a member of the Royal Swedish Academy of Music.

== Prizes and awards ==
- 1997 - Royal Swedish Academy of Music scholarship to study at the Royal College of Music in London
- 1998 - Second place in the Masterprize International Composing Competition for Wings of the Wind
- 2000 - The Society of Swedish Composers scholarship
- 2005 - The Christ Johnson Prize (Christ Johnson-prisen) minor award for Symphony No. 1 The Triumph of Heaven
- 2006 - TCO Culture Award (awarded jointly)
- 2008 - Member of the Royal Swedish Academy of Music Award
- 2008 - Music Publishers Award (Musikförläggarna) for The Ground Beneath Her Feet
- 2009 - The Rosenberg Prize (Hilding Constantin Rosenberg prize)
- 2010 - Music Publishers Award (Musikförläggarna) for Golden Dances of the Pharaohs
- 2011 - Christ Johnson Award (Christ Johnson-prisen) Grand Prize of the Golden Dances of the Pharaohs
- 2016 - The Stockholm Music Association (Musikföreningen i Stockholm) Choir-composer Scholarship
- 2017 - Expressen's Spelmannen Award for 2016
- STIM's Scholarship - 1998, 2000, 2001, 2003

== Selected works ==
=== Orchestral ===
- Image – Reflection (1994) for 2 violins and orchestra
- A Shadow of the Night (1995) for orchestra
- Octagon (1996) for piano and orchestra
- Schreitende Alléen (1997) for orchestra
- Wings of the Wind (1997) for orchestra
- Symphony No.1 The Triumph of Heaven (2003) for orchestra
- Colours of Autumn (2002) for orchestra
- The Kingdom of Silence (2003) for orchestra
- Before the Mountains Were Born (2005) for woodwind and orchestra
- Open Ground (2006) for orchestra
- Angelus (2008) for orchestra
- Golden Dances of the Pharaohs (2010) for clarinet and orchestra
- Träumerei (2010), transcription for symphony orchestra of a piano piece by Robert Schumann
- Wunderbare Leiden (2010) fantasy on themes by Robert and Clara Schumann for two pianos and symphony orchestra

=== Large ensemble ===
- Keter (2003) for 12 saxophones
- Creation of the Hymn (2013) for string orchestra

=== Chamber and small ensemble ===
- Rainbow Hunt (1995) for flute, saxophone, guitar, percussion and tape
- Creation of the Hymn (1996) for string quartet
- Behind the Shadows (1998) for viola, cello, contrabass and percussion
- ...im Klosterhofe (1998) for cello, piano and tape
- ...ein schöner Winterabend in Sachsen (1999) for violin and piano
- Roosters in Love (1999) for saxophone quartet
- Ce n'est pas le geste qui dure... (2002) for flute, guitar, viola and cello
- In a World Unspoken (2005) for saxophone quartet and organ
- Seven Singing Butterflies (2005) for clarinet and string quartet

=== Choral ===
- Psalm 42: Wie der Hirsch schreit (2008) for orchestra, two soloists, mixed choir and organ
- Vinden som ingenting minns (2015) for choir and orchestra

=== Opera and stage ===
- The Ground Beneath Her Feet (2007) stage performance for orchestra, singers and narrators (Libretto: Edward Kemp after a novel of the same name by Salman Rushdie)
- Hamlet drama (2008) for trombone and orchestra (Libretto: William Shakespeare)
- Dracula (2017) opera

=== Keyboard works ===
- Hymn i sten (1996) for piano
- Adoration of the Magi in the Snow (2000) a polyphonic fantasy for organ
- Silent Island (2000) for piano
- A Midnight Bell (2002) for piano
- Secret Beauty of Waters (2004) for piano
- Serenade for Twins (2004) for piano
- Djurgården Tales (2009–11) for two pianos
