= North Czech Philharmonic Teplice =

Czech symphony orchestra based in Teplice

The North Czech Philharmonic Teplice (Czech: Severočeská filharmonie Teplice) is a professional symphony orchestra based in Teplice, the Czech Republic. The orchestra traces its origins to the spa-music tradition of Teplice, with its foundation charter and official approval dated to 1838, making it one of the oldest orchestral institutions in Central Europe. It is the only professional symphony orchestra in the Ústí Region.

During its history the orchestra has had several prominent musicians appear as guest artists, including performances led by conductors Eugen d'Albert, Richard Strauss, Siegfried Wagner, Felix Weingartner, and Alexander Zemlinsky. Other musicians who have performed with the orchestra include pianists Ferruccio Busoni, Conrad Ansorge, Emil von Sauer, Ernő Dohnányi, Teresa Carreño, Moriz Rosenthal and Frederic Lamond; violinists Pablo de Sarasate, Eugène Ysaÿe, Bronisław Huberman, Fritz Kreisler, Joseph Joachim, Adolf Busch, Willy Burmester, Alexander Petschnikoff, and Henri Marteau; cellists David Popper, Julius Klengel, Hugo Becker, Anton Hekking, and Pablo Casals; and vocalists Lilli Lehmann, Ernestine Schumann-Heink and Vittorio Arimondi.

== History ==
The musical life of Teplice developed in close connection with the town's role as a spa centre. A surviving official document concerning spa music in Teplice dates from February 1831, and preparations for a permanent spa orchestra culminated in the foundation and official approval of the orchestra in 1838. In the nineteenth and early twentieth centuries the orchestra gave regular spa and symphonic concerts, reflecting Teplice's status as a meeting place for aristocratic, cultural and musical life in Central Europe.

By the late nineteenth century the orchestra was presenting regular symphonic cycles with many of the leading conductors and soloists of the period. Its historic guest list included Richard Strauss, Felix Weingartner, Siegfried Wagner and Alexander Zemlinsky as conductors, as well as Ferruccio Busoni, Teresa Carreño, Ernő Dohnányi, Pablo de Sarasate, Eugène Ysaÿe, Bronisław Huberman, Fritz Kreisler, Joseph Joachim, Hugo Becker, Pablo Casals, Julius Klengel, David Popper and Lilli Lehmann. During the spa season the orchestra played a large number of concerts, including open-air and spa concerts as well as symphonic programmes.

The period up to 1945 has been the subject of academic research, including Tomáš Kolařík's 2014 thesis on the history of the North Czech Philharmonic Teplice from 1838 to 1945, which discusses the development of spa music in Teplice, the foundation of the orchestra, its early Kapellmeisters and the major composers and performers associated with the town.

== Post-war development and modern period ==
After the Second World War the orchestra was reorganised within the cultural life of Teplice. In the later twentieth century the ensemble was shaped by conductors including Miloslav Bervíd, Bohumil Berka, Jaroslav Soukup, Jan Štván and Tomáš Koutník. Under Jaroslav Soukup, who served from 1972 to 1989, the orchestra expanded in size and, from 1979, used the name North Czech Philharmonic Teplice. The same period also saw efforts to strengthen the orchestra's concert infrastructure in Teplice, including the ambition to create a concert hall appropriate for a professional symphonic ensemble.

Tomáš Koutník, chief conductor from 1991 to 1997, is associated with a significant artistic period for the orchestra. His work with the ensemble included recordings of the complete symphonies of Franz Schubert. In 1997 the Canadian conductor Charles Olivieri-Munroe became chief conductor. His tenure brought a new period of international activity, audience development and wider touring, and he later became honorary principal conductor of the orchestra.

Alfonso Scarano became chief conductor in 2013 and served until 2018. Since September 2018 the orchestra's chief conductor has been Petr Vronský, whose work with the orchestra has placed renewed emphasis on Czech repertoire alongside the ensemble's continuing international and symphonic activity.

== Festivals, tours and concert activity ==
The North Czech Philharmonic Teplice appears at major Czech music festivals, including the Prague Spring International Music Festival, the Antonín Dvořák Festival, the Ludwig van Beethoven Music Festival, the Český Krumlov Festival, the Gustav Mahler Festival and the Leoš Janáček Festival. The orchestra has also performed internationally in many European countries, including Germany, Italy, Austria, Spain, Switzerland, Monaco, France, Belgium, Denmark, Portugal, Croatia, Slovenia, Hungary, Slovakia, Serbia and Malta.

In autumn 2013 the orchestra undertook an Asian tour that included Vietnam, Cambodia, Hong Kong, Singapore, Malaysia and Brunei. Performances included appearances in venues such as the Dewan Filharmonik Petronas in Kuala Lumpur, as well as concerts in Phnom Penh and Bandar Seri Begawan. In spring 2017 the orchestra toured South America, performing in Santiago de Chile, San Juan, Córdoba, Rosario and Buenos Aires.

The orchestra is also closely connected with the Ludwig van Beethoven Music Festival in Teplice. The festival was founded in 1964 in honour of Ludwig van Beethoven's stays in Teplice in 1811 and 1812, and it developed from earlier Beethoven Days organised in the town from 1951. The North Czech Philharmonic Teplice is entrusted with the dramaturgy and organisation of the festival, which expanded in 2004 and now presents around 20 concerts in approximately 10 cities of the Ústí Region.

== Collaborations and guest artists ==
In the modern period the North Czech Philharmonic Teplice has collaborated with a wide range of international soloists, singers and conductors. Artists associated with the orchestra and its festival activity include Mischa Maisky, Sharon Kam, Shlomo Mintz, Maxim Shostakovich, Vovka Ashkenazy, Kun-Woo Paik, José Carreras and David Lomelí. The orchestra has also appeared with Maxim Vengerov, including a 2026 Beethoven Festival Teplice concert under Petr Vronský.

Other recent or contemporary collaborators include violinists Václav Hudeček, Cihat Aşkın and Fabiola Kim, baritone Yuanliang Wei, conductors Charles Olivieri-Munroe, Alfonso Scarano, Petr Vronský, Nayden Todorov and Jan Kučera.

The orchestra has also been used in educational and professional-development contexts. The Koutnik Academy has organised advanced conducting masterclasses with the North Czech Philharmonic Teplice, linking the orchestra's professional work with the training of young conductors and soloists.

== Recordings ==
The orchestra's recording activity has included work under Charles Olivieri-Munroe and other conductors. Among documented commercial releases are Natasha Korsakova Plays Gershwin & More, recorded with violinist Natasha Korsakova, the North Czech Philharmonic Teplice and Charles Olivieri-Munroe, released in 2010. The orchestra also appears on a 2018 recording of Arvo Pärt's Tabula Rasa with Natasha Korsakova, Manrico Padovani and Charles Olivieri-Munroe.

== Principal conductors ==
- Karl Schmitt (1838–1848)
- Franz Lagler (1848–1864)
- Hans Schöttner (1864–1869)
- Karl Peters (1870–1886)
- Karl Wosahlo (1886–1898)
- Franz Zeischka (1898–1906)
- Johannes Reichert (1906–1922)
- Oskar Konrad Wille (1922–1938)
- Bruno Schestak (1938–1945)
- Miloš Sedmidubsky (1948)
- Bohus Slezák (1948)
- Josef Hrnčíř (1948–1949)
- Miloslav Bervíd (1949–1956)
- Bohumil Berka (1956–1972)
- Jaroslav Soukup (1972–1989)
- Jan Štván (1989–1991)
- Tomáš Koutník (1991–1997)
- Charles Olivieri-Munroe (1997–2013); honorary principal conductor
- Alfonso Scarano (2013–2018)
- Petr Vronský (2018–present)
