= Concerto Grosso for String Orchestra =

Concerto Grosso for String Orchestra may refer to:

- Handel concerti grossi Op.6, twelve 1739 works by George Frideric Handel
- Concerto Grosso No. 1 (Bloch) or Concerto Grosso for string orchestra with piano obbligato, a 1925 work by Ernest Bloch
- Concerto Grosso (Vaughan Williams), a 1950 work by Ralph Vaughan Williams
- Palladio, suite from the 1996 album Diamond Music by Karl Jenkins

== See also ==
- Concerto grosso
