= Marine – à travers les arbres =

Orchestral composition by Andrew March

- by Andrew March
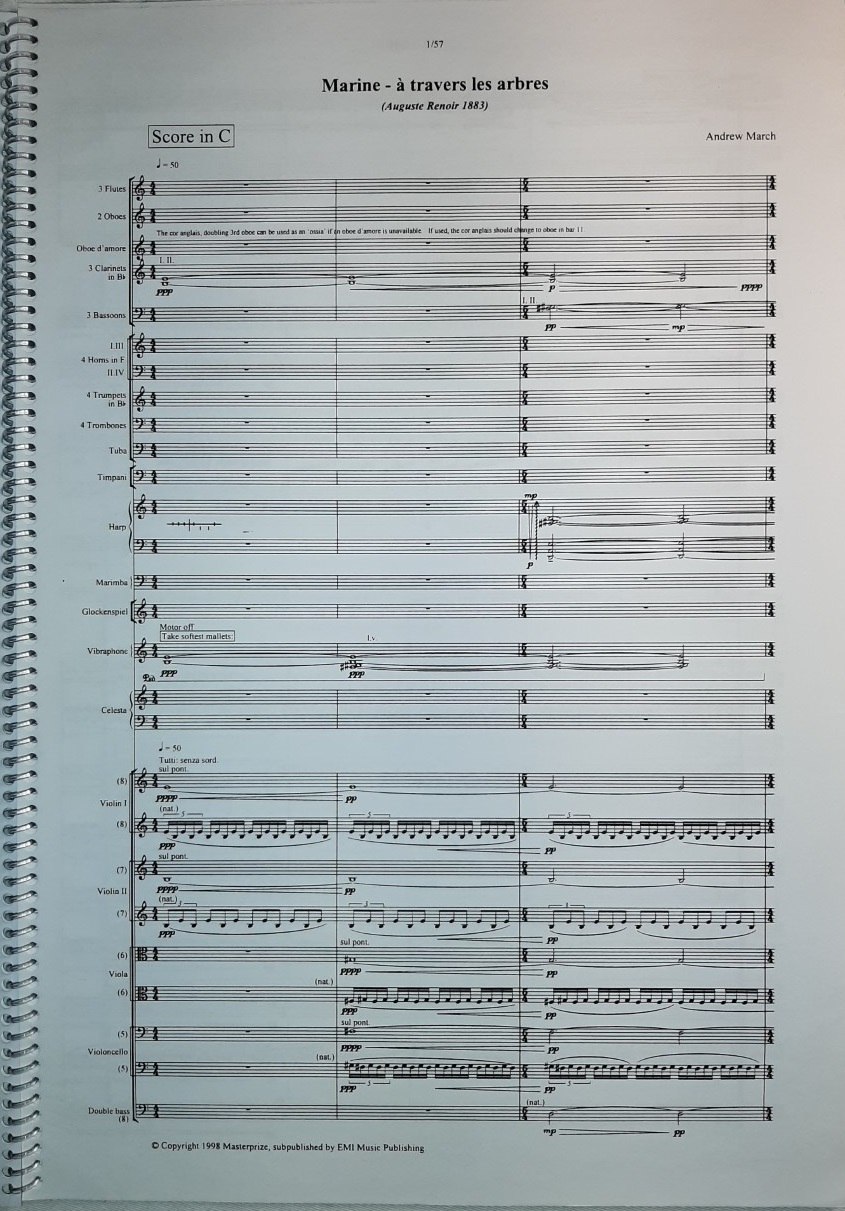
- First page of the full score of Marine – à travers les arbres
- Period: Contemporary classical music
- Genre: Orchestral music
- Form: Through-composed music
- Composed: 1997
- Published: 1998
- Publisher: EMI Music Publishing
- Recorded: 1997
- Duration: 11:48
- Scoring: Large orchestra

Premiere
- Date: 7 April 1998
- Location: Barbican Centre, London
- Conductor: Daniel Harding
- Performers: London Symphony Orchestra
- Winning work, 1998 Masterprize Composing Competition

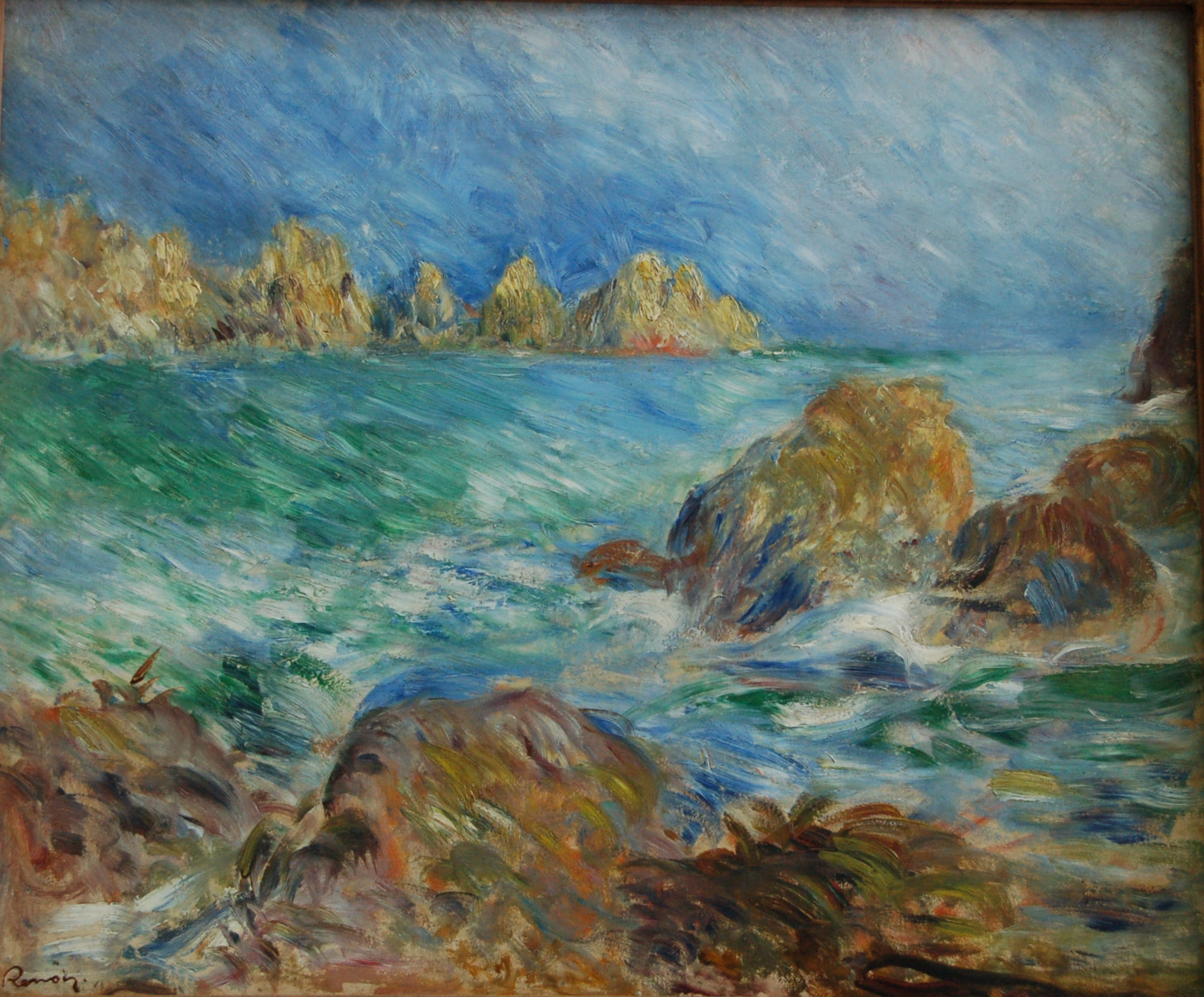
Marine à Guernsey (Marine, Guernsey), 1883, by Pierre-Auguste Renoir

Marine – à travers les arbres is an orchestral composition by the English composer Andrew March. It was the winning piece in the inaugural Masterprize International Composing Competition held in 1998 after having been selected from 1,318 entries from over 60 countries. The impressionistic work has been performed 13 times throughout the world.

== Composition ==
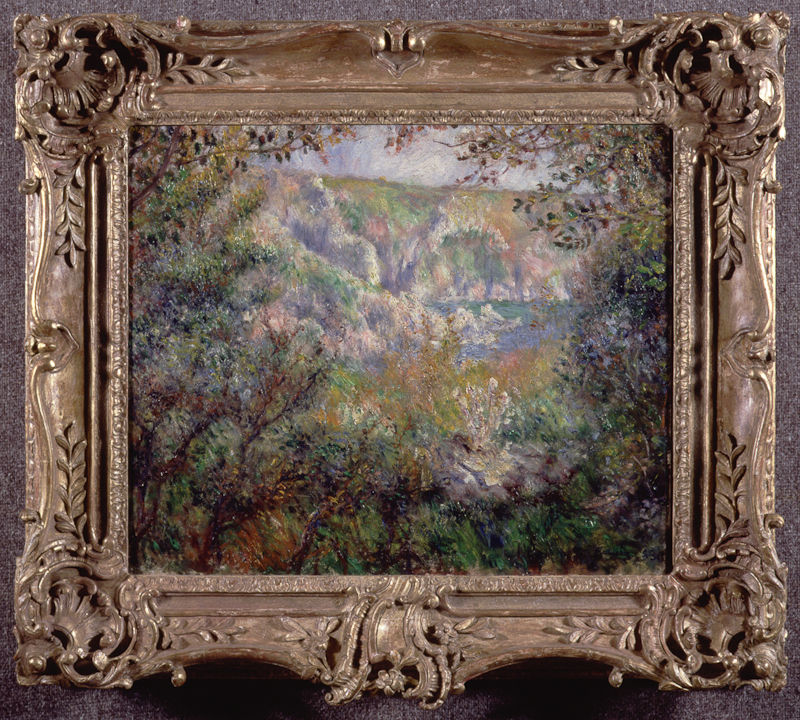
Baie du Moulin Huet à travers les arbres (Moulin Huet Bay through the trees), 1883, by Pierre-Auguste Renoir

Marine – à travers les arbres was inspired by the spectacular scenery of Moulin Huet Bay in Guernsey and two of Pierre-Auguste Renoir's paintings of the same bay in 1883; Baie du Moulin Huet à travers les arbres and Marine à Guernsey. In September 1996, Andrew March made sketches of what would become his symphonic “tone pictures”, but it was only when he had knowledge of the Masterprize composing competition that he was spurred on with the compositional process. The resultant piece has a duration of 11 minutes 48.

== Reception ==
His winning work, Marine – à travers les arbres, is a lush, impressionistic symphonic poem with overtones of Delius and Debussy.

— Anna Tims, BBC Music Magazine (June 1998)

It combines lyricism with atmospheric effect, evoking a picture of tranquillity.

— Stephen Pettitt, The Sunday Times (February 1998)

Marine – à travers les arbres received critical acclaim both during the Masterprize competition and in reviews of the gala final. After receiving the highest combined votes from members of the public and a jury of eminent classical musicians, the piece became the overall winning work. However, the new status of the piece was greeted with mixed reactions by music critics who felt that it was one of the weakest of the six competition pieces.

Some might accuse him of writing film music. But it was what he meant, and his vast public clearly approved.

— Stephen Pettitt, The Sunday Times (April 1998)

The majority of post-Masterprize reviews criticised March’s winning piece. Rob Cowan, writing in The Independent in the wake of the Masterprize final, made it clear he would not have chosen the piece as the winning work:

As to the winning Marine – à travers les arbres, I could quite imagine March climbing a Guernsey cliff-top to embrace the sky: wave on wave of hedonistic harmony broke from the stage, but was it prize-winning material? Not in my view.

Sara Austin writing for the Forum of the Symphony Orchestra Institute in October 1998 pointed out that:

The choice of March’s Marine – the most traditionally tonal and melodious of the final pieces – also raised hackles among music critics, several of whom called the piece derivative and mediocre.

== Publishing ==
In 1998, Marine – à travers les arbres was published by Masterprize and sub–published by EMI Music Publishing Ltd and the piece has since been handled by the hire library of the Music Sales Group.

== Recordings ==
Marine – à travers les arbres was first recorded in 1997 by the BBC Philharmonic with conductor Philip Ellis for the semi-finals of the Masterprize Composing Competition. Between 21 and 23 December 1997, the London Symphony Orchestra recorded the work in Studio 1, Abbey Road Studios. This recording was released as the covermount CD of the March 1998 edition of the BBC Music Magazine (BBCMM67), and the same recording was subsequently released by EMI on the Debut Series (CDZ5728262) on 6 September 1998. The covermount CD of the six finalist works was one of the competition's methods for capturing the votes of the public, enabling the magazine's worldwide readership of over 200,000 to take part.

== Performances ==
The world première of Marine – à travers les arbres with given by the London Symphony Orchestra under Daniel Harding on Tuesday, 7 April 1998, during the Masterprize Gala Final at the Barbican Centre in London. Later in 1998, there were further performances in Zurich and Moscow with the State Tchaikovsky Symphony Orchestra under conductor, Mischa Damev. As part of the European Union Youth Orchestra (EUYO) tour of 1998, Marine – à travers les arbres received repeat performances at concerts in Düsseldorf, Gävle (Sweden) and at EXPO' 98, Lisbon. The EUYO tour culminated in September 1998 with a televised performance at The Proms under the direction of internationally renowned conductor Vladimir Ashkenazy.

== Broadcasts ==
The first Masterprize competition reached an estimated global listenership of 100 to 150 million. As one of the finalist pieces and eventually the overall winner, Marine – a travers les arbres benefit from 250 airings across 40 international stations.

The first broadcast of Marine – a travers les arbres took place during BBC Radio 3’s Musical Encounters with Mark Rowlinson on 4 November 1997. The broadcast used the first recording made under the auspices of the European Broadcasting Union for the semifinals, and featured the BBC Philharmonic with conductor Philip Ellis.

The interest of radio stations has continued well beyond the immediate fallout of Masterprize with airplay in 2004 on WNYC-FM (New York Public Radio) and Concertzender Netherlands. In August 2005, the piece featured on Rádio e Televisão de Portugal (RTP2) as part of the series "A Geografia dos Sons" and in August 2006 and April 2007 there were broadcasts on Brazil's Rádio Cultura programme "A Seguir Harmonia" (Ask The Maestro) with João Mauricio Galindo. In November 2015, Marine – a travers les arbres was aired during the Full Works Programme on Classic FM (South Africa).
