= String orchestra =

Musical ensemble

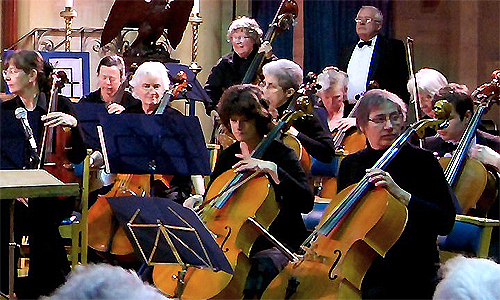
A string orchestra

Fantasia on a Theme by Thomas Tallis
Ralph Vaughan Williams' Fantasia on a Theme by Thomas Tallis (1910), performed by the U.S. Army Band Strings

A string orchestra is an orchestra consisting solely of a string section made up of the bowed strings used in Western Classical music. The instruments of such an orchestra are most often the following: the violin, which is divided into first and second violin players (each usually playing different parts), the viola, the cello, and usually, but not always, the double bass.

String orchestras can be of chamber orchestra size ranging from between 12 (4 first violins, 3 second violins, 2 violas, 2 cellos and 1 bass = 12) and 21 musicians (6 first violins, 5 second violins, 4 violas, 4 cellos and 2 double basses= 21) sometimes performing without a conductor. It could also consist of the entire string section of a large symphony orchestra which could have 60 musicians (16 first violins, 14 second violins, 12 violas, 10 cellos and 8 double basses = 60; Gurre-Lieder calls for 84: 20.20.16.16.12).

== Repertoire ==
Serenade for Strings (Op. 20, 1st movement)
Edward Elgar's "Serenade for Strings, movement 1" performed by the United States Army Band Strings ensemble

The repertoire includes several works by Mozart (including Eine kleine Nachtmusik), William Boyce (his eight symphonies are for strings only), and Haydn which dispense with the baroque basso continuo. Some of these works are problematic when it comes to deciding whether they are for orchestra or string quartet. Particularly in Haydn's early works it is argued that the inversions of harmony from the occasional crossings of the bass and viola line imply a double bass; the question is not settled, however.

Important 20th-century works have been written for string orchestra by Bartók (Divertimento for String Orchestra), Stravinsky (Apollo), Witold Lutosławski (Musique funèbre), Benjamin Britten (Simple Symphony and Variations on a Theme of Frank Bridge), Charles Wuorinen (Grand Bamboula), and Malcolm Williamson (Symphony No. 7). Sir Michael Tippett wrote a Concerto for Double String Orchestra and Ralph Vaughan Williams wrote a Partita for Double String Orchestra. Composers who have written a Serenade for string orchestra include Tchaikovsky, Dvořák, Suk and Elgar. Mendelssohn, in his youth, also wrote thirteen symphonies for string orchestra.

Danse Sacrée L 103, No. 1

Danse Profane L 103, No. 2
Danses sacrée et profane by Debussy, performed by the United States Marine Chamber Orchestra. Arrangement of the chamber music pieces scored for string quintet of violin, viola, cello, double bass, and cross-strung harp.

Sometimes works originally written for string quartet, quintet, sextet etc. are arranged for string orchestra. Samuel Barber's Adagio for Strings, Alban Berg's 3 Pieces from his Lyric Suite, Arnold Schoenberg's string sextet Verklärte Nacht and String Quartet No. 2, Pyotr Ilyich Tchaikovsky's sextet Souvenir de Florence, John Corigliano's Second String Quartet and Jean Sibelius's Andante festivo are examples. An optional timpani part is also added in the Sibelius piece. The work Shaker Loops written in 1978 for septet then arranged in 1983 for string orchestra by the American composer John Adams has become a popular addition to the repertoire in recent times. Graham Waterhouse composed several works for string orchestra (Sinfonietta), also in combination with contrasting sounds as Great Highland bagpipe (Chieftain's Salute).

== Works for string orchestra ==
The majority of the works listed below are scored strictly for string orchestra, but others may include additional parts (usually keyboards, harp, timpani, percussion, and concerto/vocal soloists).

- Louis Andriessen: Symphony for Open Strings
- Lera Auerbach:
  - String Symphony "Memoria de la Luz" (2013)
  - Serenade for a Melancholic Sea for violin, violoncello, piano and string orchestra (2002)
  - Dialogues of Stabat Mater (after G.B. Pergolesi) for violin, viola, vibraphone and string orchestra (2005)
- Granville Bantock: Celtic Symphony for string orchestra and six harps
- Samuel Barber: Adagio for Strings
- Béla Bartók:
  - Divertimento for String Orchestra
  - Music for Strings, Percussion and Celesta
  - Romanian Dances for String Orchestra
- Mason Bates: Icarian Rhapsody (1999)
- Jeremy Beck: Sinfonietta (2000)
- Alan Belkin: Adagio Symphonique (2002)
- Luciano Berio: Notturno (1995)
- Leonard Bernstein: Serenade for Solo Violin, Strings, Harp and Percussion after Plato's "Symposium"
- Judith Bingham: The Hythe (2012)
- Georges Bizet: Adagietto, L'Arlesienne Suite No. 1 (1872)
- Ernest Bloch: Concerto Grosso No. 2
- Nimrod Borenstein
  - In the night, Op. 48 (2007)
  - In the morning, Op. 51 (2008)
  - Symphony for strings, Op. 68 (2014)
  - Suspended, Op. 69 (2014)
  - Yodit, Op. 82 (2018)
- Pierre Boulez: Livre pour cordes
- Frank Bridge: Lament (1915)
- Benjamin Britten: Simple Symphony
- Stephen Brown:
  - The Carol Suite (1993)
  - Sunrise Serenade (2001)
  - On the Idle Hill of Summer (2002)
- John Cage: Twenty-Three (for violins, violas, and cellos). Additionally, many of Cage's indeterminate scores could be arranged for string orchestra.
- Carlos Chávez: Symphony No. 5
- Qigang Chen:
  - Enchantements oubliés (2004)
  - L'Eloignement (2004)
- Nigel Clarke: The Miraculous Violin
- Anna Clyne:
  - Within Her Arms (2009)
  - Prince of Clouds (2012)
- Paul Creston: Gregorian Chant for String Orchestra (1936)
- Tansy Davies: Residuum
- David Diamond: Rounds for String Orchestra (1944)
- Avner Dorman: Concerto Grosso (2002–2003)
- Antonín Dvořák: Serenade for String Orchestra in E major, Op.22
- Edward Elgar:
  - Introduction and Allegro for Strings (1905)
  - Serenade for Strings
- Irving Fine: Serious Song: A Lament for String Orchestra (1955)
- Gerald Finzi: Romance, Op. 11 (1928)
- Arthur Foote: Suite in E major for String Orchestra, Op. 63 (1909)
- Alberto Ginastera: Concerto per corde, Op. 33 (originally written for string quartet then arranged for string orchestra)
- Philip Glass: film score for The Hours (large string orchestra plus piano soloist)
- Henryk Górecki: Three Pieces in Old Style (1963)
- Edvard Grieg: Holberg Suite (originally written for piano then arranged for string orchestra)
- Stefans Grové: Elegy for Strings (1948)
- Yalil Guerra:
  - Old Havana
  - A la Antigua
  - Terra Ignota (Unknown Land)
  - Clave (for strings and percussion)
  - El Retrato de la Paloma (The Portrait of the Dove)
  - Symphony No. 2 for strings "Los Dioses del Olimpo" (The Olympian Gods)
  - Al Partir (On Leaving)
  - Negro Bembón
- Mark Gustavson: Hymn to the Vanished (2001)
- Karl Amadeus Hartmann: Symphony No. 4
- Victor Herbert: Serenade for Strings
- Alfred Hill: String Symphonies
- Gustav Holst:
  - St Paul's Suite (1912)
  - Brook Green Suite (1933)
  - A Moorside Suite (1928)
- Arthur Honegger: Symphony No. 2
- Alan Hovhaness: Symphony No. 31 (1976–77)
- Charles Ives: The Call of the Mountains (arranged by Jonathan Dore from the String Quartet No. 2)
- Karl Jenkins: Palladio (1996)
- Paul Juon: Five Pieces for String Orchestra, op.16
- Vasily Kalinnikov: Serenade for Strings in G minor
- Mieczysław Karłowicz: Serenade for Strings Op. 2 (1897)
- Nigel Keay: Serenade for Strings
- Uuno Klami: Suite for String Orchestra (1937)
- Sophie Lacaze:
  - Y aparece el sol (2017) for flute, didgeridoo and string orchestra
  - Immobilité sérieuse I (2013) for piano and string orchestra
- Claude Ledoux (composer):
  - Adagio for string orchestra (2005)
  - Desert Song and Dance for string orchestra (2025)
- Kenneth Leighton:
  - Symphony for Strings, Op. 3 (1948–49)
  - Concerto for String Orchestra, Op. 39 (1960–61)
- Elizabeth Maconchy: Symphony for Double String Orchestra (1952–53)
- Gustav Mahler: Adagietto from Symphony No. 5.
- Gian Francesco Malipiero: Symphony No. 6 "Degli Archi" (1947)
- Andrew March: Sanguis Venenatus (Tainted Blood) Elegy for Strings (2009)
- Bohuslav Martinů: Double Concerto for Two String Orchestras, Piano, and Timpani
- Nicholas Maw: Life Studies
- Felix Mendelssohn:
  - 13 String Symphonies
  - Concerto for Violin and Strings
- Wolfgang Amadeus Mozart:
  - Three Concertos for Piano and Strings in D major, G major and E♭ major, K. 107 (1771 or 1765)
  - Divertimento No. 1 for Strings in D major, K. 136/125a (1772)
  - Divertimento No. 2 for Strings in B♭ major, K. 137/125b (1772)
  - Divertimento No. 3 for Strings in F major, K. 138/125c (1772)
  - Eine kleine Nachtmusik (1787)
- Lior Navok: Between Two Coasts
- Ștefan Niculescu: Formants (1967), for 17 solo strings
- Robert Paterson:
  - Suite for String Orchestra (2011)
  - I See You (for String Orchestra and Recording) (2015)
- Vincent Persichetti: Symphony No. 5
- Allan Pettersson:
  - Concerto No. 1 (1949–50)
  - Concerto No. 2 (1956)
  - Concerto No. 3 (1956–57)
- Ottorino Respighi: Ancient Airs and Dances, Suite No. 3 (1932)
- Carl Ruggles: Portals
- Aulis Sallinen: Aspects of the Funeral March of Hintriki Peltoniemi (originally written for string quartet then arranged for string orchestra)
- Esa-Pekka Salonen: Stockholm Diary (2004)
- Arnold Schoenberg: Verklärte Nacht or Transfigured Night (1899) (originally written for string sextet then arranged for string orchestra)
- Franz Schreker:
  - Scherzo for String Orchestra (1900)
  - Intermezzo for String Orchestra (Op. 8, 1900)
- William Schuman: Symphony No. 5
- Dmitri Shostakovich:
  - Chamber Symphonies - Rudolf Barshai's orchestrations of String Quartets No. 1, 3, 4, 8, 10, & 13.
  - Piano Concerto No. 1 in C Minor (Op. 35, 1933) - For piano, trumpet, and string orchestra.
  - Symphony No. 14 in G Minor (Op. 135, 1969) - For soprano, bass, percussion, and string orchestra.
- Jean Sibelius: Andante festivo for strings and timpani
- Richard St. Clair Symphony for String Orchestra
- Richard Strauss: Metamorphosen for 23 solo strings
- Igor Stravinsky:
  - Concerto in D (1946)
  - Apollon Musagète (1927–1928), ballet for string orchestra
- Josef Suk: Serenade for Strings (Op. 6, 1892)
- William Susman:
  - Zydeco Madness
  - Angels of Light
- Tōru Takemitsu: Requiem (1957)
  - "A Way a Lone II" (1981)
- Pyotr Ilyich Tchaikovsky: Serenade for Strings in C major, Op. 48
- Michael Tippett:
  - Concerto for Double String Orchestra
  - Corelli Fantasia
  - Little Music for Strings
- Joan Trimble: "Suite for Strings" (1951)
- Pēteris Vasks:
  - Cantabile (1979)
  - Musica Dolorosa (1984)
- Ralph Vaughan Williams:
  - Fantasia on a Theme by Thomas Tallis
  - Five Variants of Dives and Lazarus
  - Concerto Grosso
- Heitor Villa-Lobos: Bachianas Brasileiras No.9
- Carl Vine: Smith's Alchemy
- Claude Vivier: Zipangu (1980)
- Julian Wagstaff: Treptow for String Orchestra (2005)
- George Walker: Lyric for Strings (1946)
- William Walton: Sonata for Strings
- Robert Ward: Concertino for String Orchestra (originally written for string quartet then arranged for string orchestra)
- Graham Waterhouse:
  - Celtic Voices and Hale Bopp (1995, 1997)
  - Sinfonietta (2002)
- Malcolm Williamson:
  - Epitaphs for Edith Sitwell (1966/72)
  - Ode for Queen Elizabeth (1980)
  - Lento for Strings (1985)
- Dag Wirén: Serenade for Strings
- John Woolrich:
  - Blue Drowning (2005)
  - It is Midnight Dr. Schweitzer
  - To the Silver Bow, double concerto for viola, double bass and strings (2014)
  - Ulysses Awakes
- Charles Wuorinen: Grand Bamboula
- Iannis Xenakis: Pithoprakta for 46 strings, 2 trombones, wood block and xylophone.
- Takashi Yoshimatsu: Threnody to Toki for Piano and String Orchestra (1980)
- Đuro Živković:
  - Serenade (2002)
  - PSALM XIII (2014)
- Ellen Taaffe Zwilich:
  - Partita (Violin Concerto No. 2) for Violin and String Orchestra (2000)
  - Commedia dell'arte (Violin Concerto No. 3) for Violin and String Orchestra (2012)
  - Prologue and Variations (1983)
