= Masterprize International Composing Competition =

International symphonic composition award

- Awarded for: Orchestral composition
- Sponsored by: Coutts & Co. (for 1998)
- Date: April 1996
- Venue: Barbican Centre, London
- Country: United Kingdom
- Reward: GBP £25,000 (in 1998); GBP £30,000 (in 2001); GBP £30,000 (in 2003)
- Established: Founded by John McLaren
- First award: 1998
- Final award: 2003
- Website: https://www.masterprize.com

The Masterprize International Composing Competition, informally known as Masterprize, was a prominent international classical music award dedicated to new symphonic composition. Founded in April 1996 by British author, investment banker and former diplomat, John McLaren, the competition was established to address a perceived aesthetic divide, as he had become 'distressed' over a long period about the 'rift' between modern composers, orchestras, programmes, broadcasters and audiences.

The brief for the inaugural competition was "to find new and original works for symphony orchestra with artistic integrity with the potential for broad and lasting appeal". Additional specifications were that the compositional entry should be of a duration of 8 to 12 minutes and that composers could be of any age or nationality. For the 2001 competition, the submitted works had to have been scored for orchestral forces of between 50 and 90 players and have a duration of between 6 and 15 minutes. Composers who were awarded first place received a monetary prize of either £25,000 for the 1998 competition, or £30,000 for the 2001 and 2003 competitions, respectively.

The first Masterprize competition which culminated in 1998 was supported by significant institutions, such as the European Broadcasting Union, the BBC orchestras, BBC Radio 3, EMI Records, the London Symphony Orchestra, the BBC Music Magazine and the Worshipful Company of Musicians. An initial shortlist of 15 selected works was recorded and broadcast by the BBC's orchestras on Radio 3, from which the final six compositions were chosen. The final round of the competition was held at the Barbican on 7 April 1998 where the London Symphony Orchestra under Daniel Harding performed the six finalist works in full. The gala concert was attended by Cherie Blair who presented the winning composers with their prizes.

== Backing and legacy ==
The competition was a high-profile promotional and broadcasting initiative backed by major cultural institutions, including the BBC World Service, BBC Radio 3, the BBC Music Magazine, the European Broadcasting Union (EBU), EMI Classics, and Gramophone magazine. In later cycles, Classic FM became a primary partner alongside National Public Radio in the United States. Finalists frequently had their works recorded by the London Symphony Orchestra and broadcast globally.

Defending the competition's structure, Masterprize founder John McLaren argued that contemporary composers too often laboured under the "myth... that no composer can expect to be appreciated in his lifetime." McLaren emphasised that the core philosophy of Masterprize relied on the benchmark of wide appeal, with 50 per cent of the total vote originating from "knowledgeable listener[s]" rather than a panel of academic experts. He noted that the competition did not explicitly mandate specific genres, tonalities, or harmonic structures, stating that "eventually the measure of it has to be: does anybody like it."

While the competition successfully achieved high levels of public engagement, its outcomes drew mixed reactions from music critics. Reviewers argued that the democratised voting system inherently favoured more traditionally tonal and melodious works. Consequently, some contemporary music critics dismissed the winning compositions as safe, derivative, or mediocre, claiming that the format disincentivised avant-garde innovation in favour of crowd-pleasing appeals.

Following the 2001 competition, The Guardian argued that none of the shortlisted entries strictly deserved to win such a high-profile competition. The critique by Andrew Clements further noted that if a prize had to be awarded, it should have gone to finalist Qigang Chen's Wu Xing (The Five Elements), praising Chen for attempting to break the competition's rigid structural mould and demonstrating a more original ear for orchestral colour than his rivals.

The third Masterprize competition, held in 2003, saw similar critical scepticism. Reviewers continued to assert that the competition's foundational goal of reconnecting contemporary composers with broad audiences had instead resulted in trite and unoriginal orchestral works. Writing for The Independent, critic Anna Picard characterised the 2003 Masterprize entries as derivative and remarked that the works "played like suggested orchestrations for a Paul McCartney symphony." Picard further argued that by presenting "these snippety samples as the best of modern music, the Masterprize mavens are insulting their audience quite outrageously."

Despite the initial wave of mixed reviews targeting the inaugural winner, media perspectives shifted during the later cycles. In a 2003 retrospective review for The Times, critic Geoff Brown noted that while the competition had generally anointed "music of thudding mediocrity," the inaugural event had at least selected Andrew March's "attractive" Marine – à travers les arbres, which went on to accumulate 13 live performances worldwide. Brown contrasted this increasing traction against the relative obscurity of the 2001 winning piece by Pierre Jalbert, which he noted had "understandably, been heard only once."

== Prize winners and finalists ==
=== 1998 Cycle ===
The inaugural competition began with an initial shortlist of 15 selected works, which were recorded by the BBC orchestras and broadcast on Radio 3 and the World Service. From this pool, six finalist compositions were chosen to advance to the final round. The competition culminated on 7 April 1998 at the Barbican Centre, London, where the London Symphony Orchestra under Daniel Harding performed the six pieces in full. The gala concert was attended by Cherie Blair, who presented the prizes.

- Winner: Andrew March (UK) – Marine – à travers les arbres
- Runner-up: Victoria Borisova-Ollas (Sweden) – Wings of the Wind
- Third-place: Daniele Gasparini (Italy)– Through the Looking Glass
- Finalists:
  - Stephen Hartke (US) – The Ascent of the Equestrian in a Balloon
  - Zhou Long (US) – Two Poems from Tang
  - Carl Vine (Australia) – Descent (Metropolis: the Workers' View)

=== 2001 Cycle ===
The second gala final was held at the Barbican Centre on 11 October 2001 with Daniel Harding conducting the London Symphony Orchestra. The entry requirements stipulated that compositions should be original orchestral works of between 6 and 15 minutes duration, scored for normal symphonic forces. The competition format shifted to select five finalists, rather than six as had been the case in the inaugural competition. From an overall pool of 1,151 eligible entries representing 62 countries, a preliminary jury pared the list down to 12 semifinalists.

- Winner: Pierre Jalbert (US) – In Aeternam
- Finalists:
  - Qigang Chen (France) – Wu Xing (The Five Elements)
  - Alistair King (UK) – Hit the Ground (Running, Running, Running)
  - Anthony Iannaccone (US) – Waiting for Sunrise on the Sound
  - Carter Pann (US) – Slalom

=== 2003 Cycle ===
The third and final competition concluded at the Barbican Hall on 30 October 2003, with the London Symphony Orchestra again conducted by Daniel Harding. The competition criteria adjusted slightly from the previous two editions, drawing from a pool of over 800 short scores for symphony orchestra representing 65 countries to arrive at a shortlist of 10 semifinalists.

- Winner: Christopher Theofanidis (US) – Rainbow Body
- Finalists:
  - Nicolas Bacri (France) – Symphonie No. 6, Op. 60
  - Bechara El-Khoury (France) – Les Fleuves Engloutis
  - Robert Henderson (UK) – Einstein's Violin
  - Arturs Maskats (Latvia) – Tango
  - Anton Plate (Germany) – You Must Finish Your Journey Alone

Masterprize Winners and Finalists
Year	1st	2nd	3rd	Other finalists				
2003	(United States) Christopher Theofanidis	—N/a		(France) Nicolas Bacri	(France) (Lebanon) Bechara El-Khoury	(United States) Robert Henderson	(Latvia) Arturs Maskats	(Germany) Anton Plate
2001	(United States) Pierre Jalbert	—N/a		(China) (France) Qigang Chen	(United Kingdom) Alistair King	(United States) Anthony Iannaccone	(United States) Carter Pann	—N/a
1998	(United Kingdom) Andrew March	(Russia) (Sweden) Victoria Borisova-Ollas	(Italy) Daniele Gasparini	(United States) Stephen Hartke	(China) (United States) Zhou Long	(Australia) Carl Vine	—N/a	
