= Arturs Maskats =

Latvian composer (born 1957)

Arturs Maskats (born 20 December 1957 in Valmiera) is a Latvian composer and since 1996 artistic director of the Latvian National Opera. His orchestral composition, Tango, received international exposure as one of the finalist works of the third Masterprize International Composing Competition in 2003. It was also played at the 2022 Summer Night Concert Schönbrunn by the Vienna Philharmonic under Andris Nelsons in Vienna, Austria.

== Works ==
- Tango for orchestra
- Opera Valentina
