= Carter Pann =

American composer (born 1972)

Carter Pann (born February 21, 1972, in La Grange, Illinois) is an American composer. He studied composition and piano at the Eastman School of Music and the University of Michigan, Ann Arbor, where he earned a Doctor of Musical Arts degree. His teachers include Samuel Adler, William Albright, Warren Benson, William Bolcom, David Liptak, Joseph Schwantner, and Bright Sheng, and piano with Barry Snyder.

His works have been performed by major orchestras, youth symphonies, and ensembles across the United States and internationally, including the London Symphony Orchestra, City of Birmingham Symphony, Vancouver Symphony, National Repertory Orchestra, and RTÉ National Symphony Orchestra. He has collaborated with artists such as clarinetist Richard Stoltzman and the Takács Quartet.

Pann has received awards and recognition from the American Academy of Arts and Letters, Masterprize, the American Composers Orchestra, and ASCAP. He was a finalist for the Pulitzer Prize for Music in 2016.

Pann currently teaches composition and conducts the Boulder Altitude Directive contemporary music ensemble at the University of Colorado Boulder.

== Selected recorded works ==
- Antares
- Dance Partita
- Deux séjours
- Differences for cello and piano
- Factories: Locomotive/Gothic/Mercurial/At Peace, for wind ensemble
- Hold This Boy and Listen
- Love Letters (2000)
- Piano Concerto
- Slalom, for symphony orchestra
- Soiree Macabre: with demons on the dance floor
- Symphony for Winds "My Brother's Brain"'
- The Bills, for piano
- The Cheese Grater – A Mean Two-Step
- The High Songs
- The Mechanics, for saxophone quartet
- The Piano's 12 Sides
- The Three Embraces
- Two Portraits of Barcelona
- Wrangler, for wind ensemble
