= Andante festivo =

Concert piece for string quartet by Jean Sibelius (1922)

- by Jean Sibelius
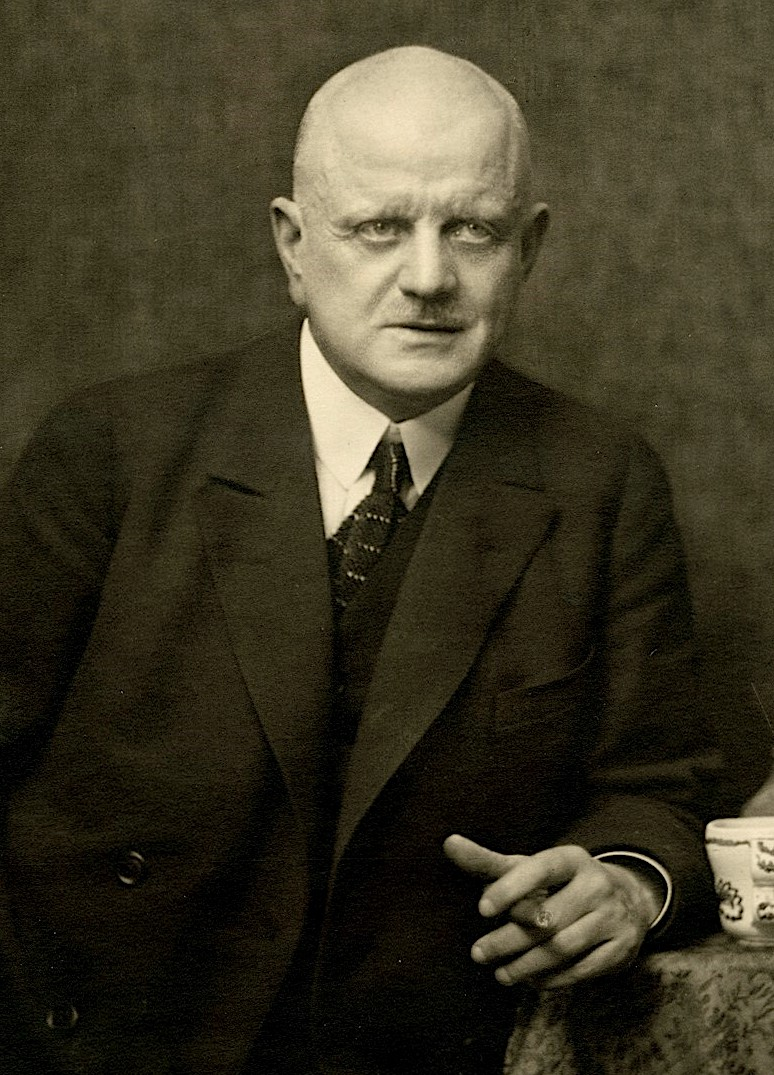
- The composer (c. 1923)
- Catalogue: JS 34a (string quartet); JS 34b (str., timp.)
- Composed: 1922, arr. 1938
- Publisher: JS 34a: Warner Chappell (2000); JS 34b: Westerlund (1940)
- Duration: 5 mins.

Premiere
- Date: 28 December 1922
- Location: Säynätsalo, Finland
- Performers: Paavo Kesäniemi (violin); Eero Vänttinen (violin); Eino Fredriksson (viola); Onni Fredriksson (cello)

Andante festivo (Italian pronunciation: [anˈdante feˈstiːvo]), JS 34a–b, is a single-movement chamber work for two violins, viola, and cello written in 1922 by the Finnish composer Jean Sibelius. In 1938, the composer arranged the piece for string orchestra and timpani. On 1 January 1939, Sibelius conducted this version of Andante festivo during a live, worldwide broadcast, making it the only sound document of him interpreting his own music.

== History ==
Walter Parviainen requested a cantata from Sibelius to celebrate the 25th anniversary of the Säynätsalo sawmills before Christmas of 1922. Sibelius wrote instead a composition for a string quartet, to become Andante festivo. It may be based on older projects, such as a planned oratorio, Marjatta, from the 1900s. At the marriage of Riitta Sibelius, a niece of the composer, in 1929, Andante festivo was performed by two string quartets, perhaps with modifications.

Sibelius listened often to the radio in the 1930s. He thought about composing for the radio in a different way, to accommodate the distortions created by the loudspeakers of the time. When Olin Downes, a critic of The New York Times, asked him to "conduct a piece of music as Finland's greeting to the world in a radio broadcast to celebrate the New York World Exhibition", he tried the concept by adapting the former string quartet. Full-throated and hymnic, this piece is a smooth, continuous stream of similar melodic phrases that flow into and out of each other. Sibelius was a violinist and knew how to compose for strings. A "seamless repeated melody" is played by the strings and answered in the last four bars by the timpani, in an almost religious statement in a world before a Second World War.

The version for strings and timpani was first performed in a broadcast on 1 January 1939 by the Radio Orchestra conducted by the composer, as the only recorded example of the composer interpreting one of his own works. He maintained a slow tempo professionally, with "unforced rubato", creating a solemn, singing string sound. He sometimes took liberty with the tempo markings in the score (and altered the first double bass entries to a C, not a G.)

A 2015 collection of recordings of music for orchestra by Sibelius, played by the Helsinki Philharmonic Orchestra, conducted by Leif Segerstam, and recorded in 1995–2007, includes the recording of Andante festivo from the archives of the Finnish Broadcasting Company and contrasts it to other works, including the Violin Concerto and the Second Symphony.

The recording conducted by Sibelius is also part of a collection of historic performances from 1928 to 1948, including recordings of the Columbia Gramophone Company (later EMI) from the 1930s, when Robert Kajanus conducted the symphonies and tone poems, many of which he had premiered.

The recording of Andante festivo was Sibelius's last performance as a conductor.

== Sources ==
- Dahlström, Fabian [in Swedish] (2003). Jean Sibelius: Thematisch-bibliographisches Verzeichnis seiner Werke [Jean Sibelius: A Thematic Bibliographic Index of His Works] (in German). Wiesbaden: Breitkopf & Härtel. ISBN 3-7651-0333-0.
