= Robert Ian Winstin =

American classical composer

Robert Ian Winstin (6 June 1959 – 26 June 2010) was a composer, conductor and pianist. His "Taliban Dances" - 'Concerto for Violin & Orchestra' was labelled a "masterpiece" by the American Record Guide. His “Spirituals for Violin & Orchestra” were premiered at Carnegie Hall.

Winstin was born in Chicago.

His recordings of his own works included his "September 11, 2001 - 9:05am," "Taliban Dances," "Oedipus Requiem," and his film score to the re-released 1904 classic Le Voyage Dans La Lune.

His music has been performed throughout the world by such ensembles as the Rochester Philharmonic, the Toronto Philharmonia, the American Symphonietta, the National Symphony Orchestra of Ukraine, the Galesburg Symphony, the Czech Philharmonic, the Prague Radio Symphony Orchestra and the Kiev Philharmonic. Winstin had been the Music Director & Principal Conductor of the Millennium Symphony, Composer in Residence of the Kiev Philharmonic, Music Director & Principal Conductor of the American Symphonietta, and Principal Guest Conductor of the Kiev Philharmonic.

Winstin also conducted the Virginia Youth Symphonic Orchestra, in Portsmouth, Virginia.

As a conductor, Winstin recorded over 50 recordings of the music of living composers, and was the music director for the recording series "Masterworks of the New Era". He was a chairman of the Mayor’s Arts Commission (IL), and a president of the Foundation for New Music.

Winstin produced albums for composers and performers such as Gustav Hoyer, Rachel Lee Guthrie, and Antonio Cora, among others.

Winstin died in Virginia of a stroke on Saturday, June 26, 2010.
