= Gustav Hoyer =

American musical artist

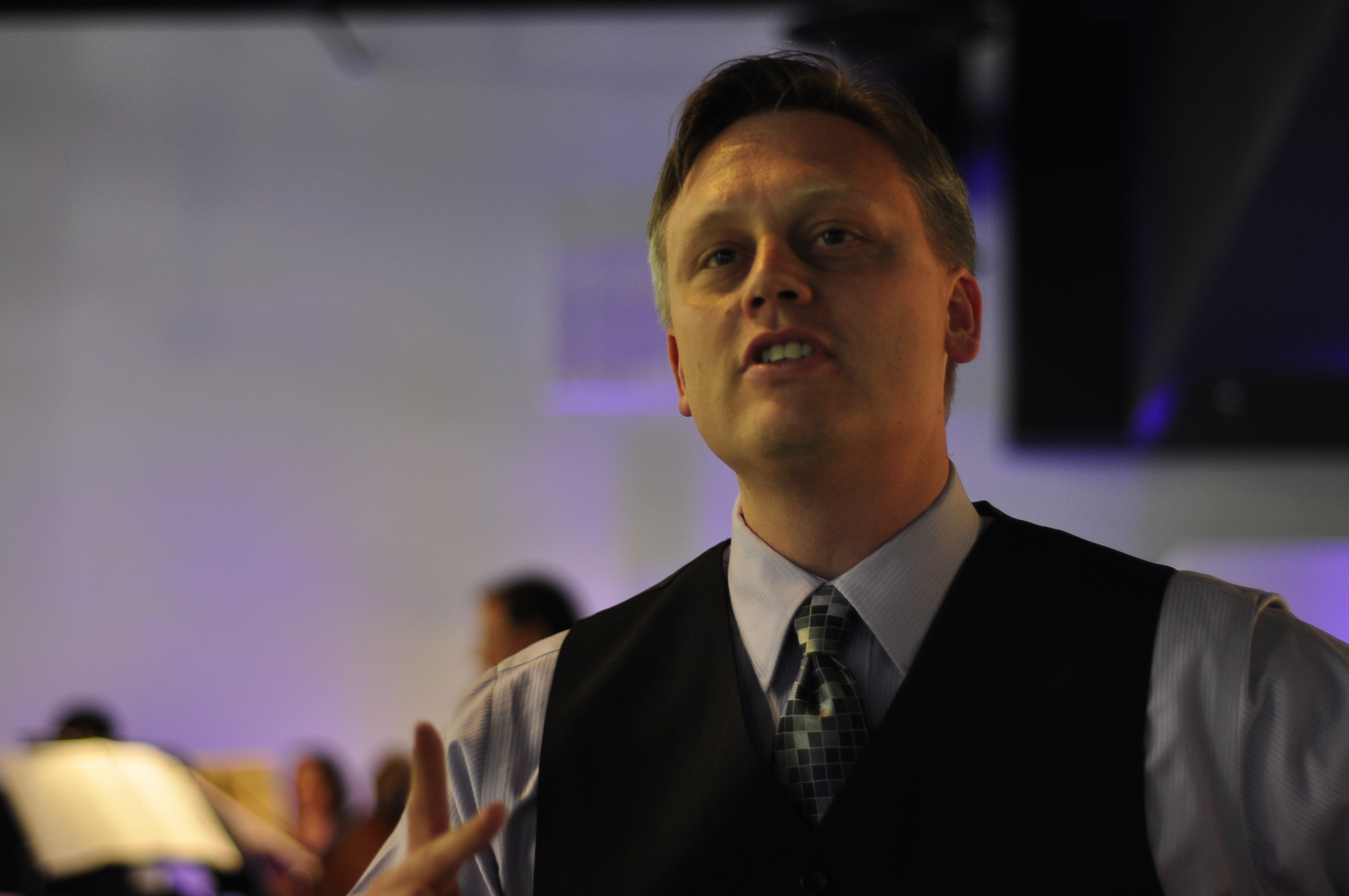
- Hoyer performing in Los Angeles, 2011

Background information
- Genre: Classical
- Occupations: Composer, pianist, conductor
- Instruments: Piano, keyboards
- Years active: 1988–present
- Website: gustavhoyer.com

Gustav Hoyer is an American pianist, composer, and conductor whose genres have been generally classified as classical and orchestral music. His compositions on Masters of the New Era: Volume 2, won 1st place for Best Classical Orchestral Album by Just Plain Folks in 2006 as well as being nominated for Best Classical Contemporary Album for his album, From Darkness Into Light in 2008.

== Career ==
Hoyer began composing classical music in high school and cites Mozart as a major influence. His music has been featured in such films as Grey Focus and A Night at the Silent Movie Theater as well as being performed by The Budapest Film Orchestra, among others. He is the founder and director of the Los Angeles-based, Orchestra Unleashed, which features a series of multimedia orchestral performances.

== Albums ==
- 2020 - The Gilded Age
- 2018 - Witness
- 2012 - A Soul Alone Before God
- 2007 - Darkness into Light
