= Concerto Grosso (Vaughan Williams) =

Composition by Ralph Vaughan Williams

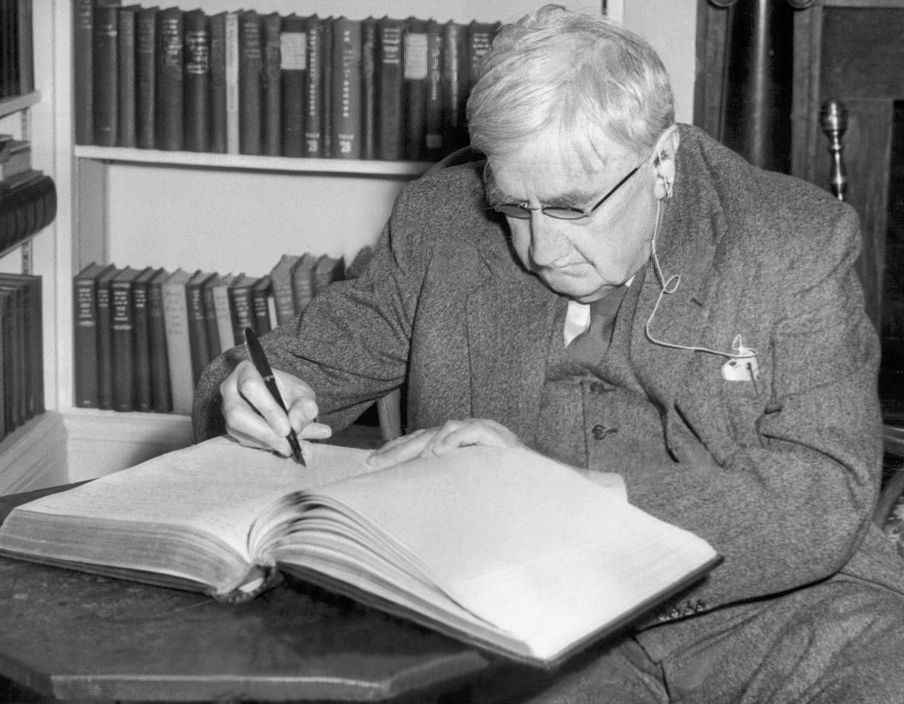
Vaughan Williams in 1954

Concerto Grosso is a work for string orchestra by Ralph Vaughan Williams. Originally composed in 1950 for a performance by the Rural Schools Music Association conducted by Sir Adrian Boult, the piece is unique in that the orchestra is split into three sections based on skill: Concertino (Advanced), Tutti (Intermediate), and Ad Lib (Novice) which only plays open strings.

The piece is in five movements:

1. Intrada: A dramatic theme that features heavy string writing
2. Burlesca Ostinata: A sprightly movement making brilliant use of perfect fifths to allow the "Ad Lib" players (who can only play open strings (tuned in intervals of perfect fifths) to play the theme.
3. Sarabande: A slow movement in triple time as indicated by the movement's name
4. Scherzo An energetic but lyrical short scherzo and a small coda
5. March and Reprise: A very lively march with much syncopation, leading seamlessly into a full reprise of the first movement.

A typical performance lasts about 14 minutes.
