= Jeremy Dale Roberts =

English composer (1934–2017)

- Born: 16 May 1934; Minchinhampton, Gloucestershire
- Died: 11 July 2017 (aged 83)
- Education: Marlborough College; Royal Academy of Music
- Occupations: Composer, teacher, pianist
- Notable work: Croquis, Deathwatch, In the Same Space, Tristia

Jeremy Dale Roberts (16 May 1934 – 11 July 2017) was an English composer and teacher. After early contact with Ralph Vaughan Williams and Gerald Finzi, Dale Roberts studied with William Alwyn and Priaulx Rainier at the Royal Academy of Music, London. He retired as Head of Composition at the Royal College of Music, London in 1999, and was a Visiting Professor of Composition at the University of Iowa for the 1999–2000 academic year.

His compositions have been performed at the Edinburgh and Aldeburgh Festivals, the Venice Biennale, the Diorama de Geneve, and the festivals of Avignon and Paris. They include

- the cello concerto Deathwatch, written for Rohan de Saram;
- Tombeau for Stephen Kovacevich;
- Croquis for string trio, written for members of the Arditti Quartet (BBC commission);
- In the Same Space, nine poems of Constantin Cavafy, written for Stephen Varcoe;
- Lines of Life, lyric episodes for ensemble, written for Lontano (BBC commission);
- Casidas y Sonetos — del amor oscuro, for solo guitar (Arts Council commission) for Charles Ramierez;
- Hamadryad for alto flute, viola and guitar;
- Stelae, a work for gamelan;
- Nightpiece for soprano and two bass viols;
- Tristia for violin and piano, written for Peter Sheppard Skaerved and Aaron Shorr.
- Wieglied (1999) for solo viola.

His compositions received attention in the context of a 70th-birthday portrait concert given at the Purcell Room in London by the ensemble Lontano in 2004, the release of an associated CD by the same group in early 2005, and most recently by the long-awaited release of a complete commercial recording of Croquis by NMC Recordings. One writer has described his style as 'a kind of ascetically sumptuous exoticism', and has further characterised Dale Roberts' music in terms of:

- the miniature form and associated possibilities of extended structuring;
- reference to artists and works in other art-forms (in particular sculpture and painting);
- the occasional use of quotation from other composers' music (albeit in the context of a rather 'pure' modernist idiolect); and
- a fondness for unusual instrumentations.

A review of the CD recording of Croquis noted: "Dale Roberts's miniatures are brilliantly able to condense a familiar image, such as the reel or the fugue, and accumulate into a substantial, 54-minute statement."
