= Moravian Philharmonic =

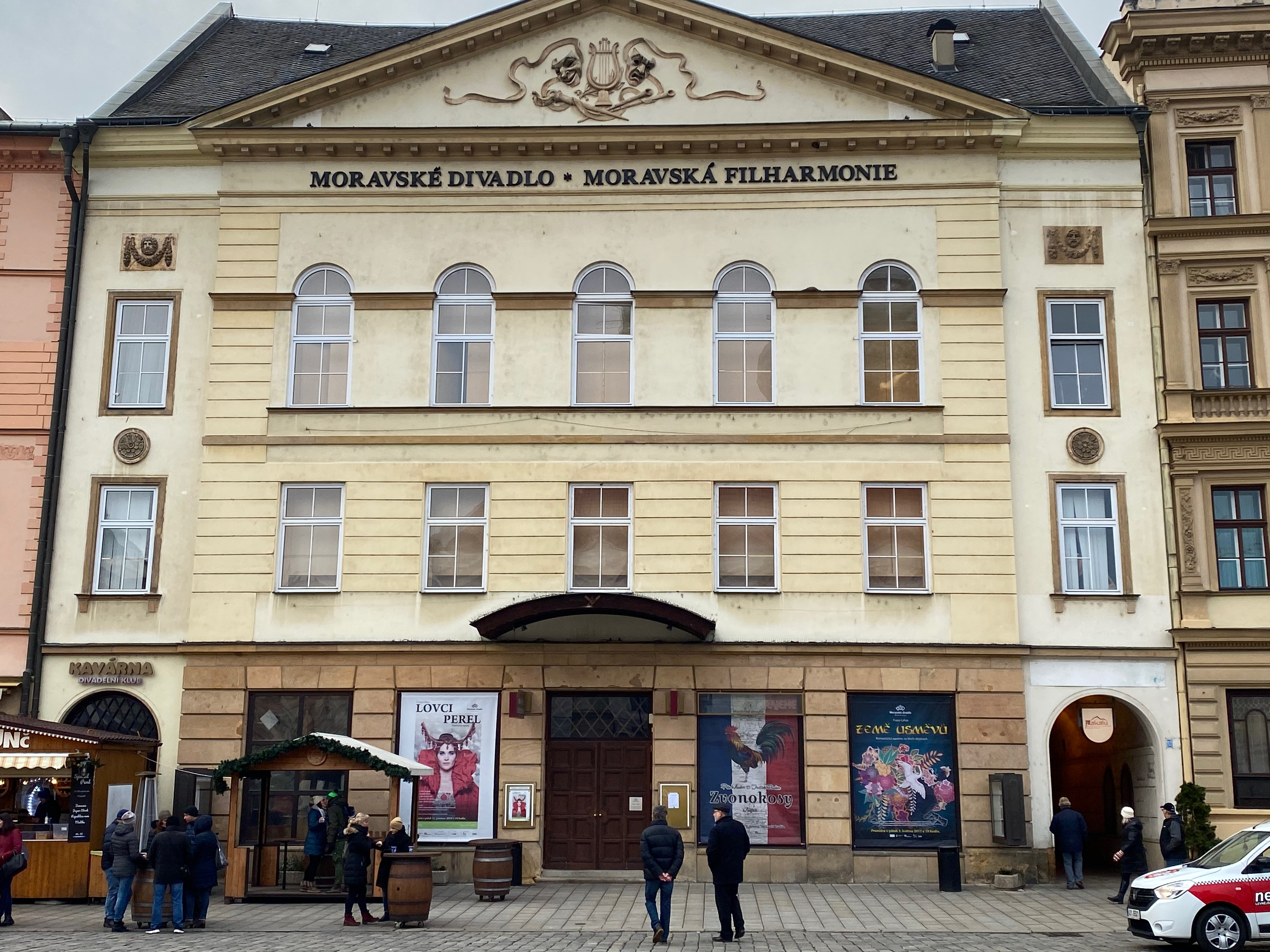

The Moravian Philharmonic (Moravská filharmonie Olomouc) is a Czech classical orchestra founded in 1945. Its resident venue is the Moravian Theatre in Olomouc.

The current director is conductor Petr Vronský. Notable collaborators include David Oistrach, Václav Hudeček, Josef Suk (1929–2011) grandson of the composer, Sviatoslav Richter, Yehudi Menuhin, Václav Neumann, Libor Pešek and others. In 2003, in collaboration with composers Jerry Martin and Andy Brick, the orchestra recorded 5 songs for the Rush Hour expansion of the Maxis game SimCity 4. Petr Pololáník conducted the group for these recordings.
