= Petr Vronský =

Czech conductor (born 1946)

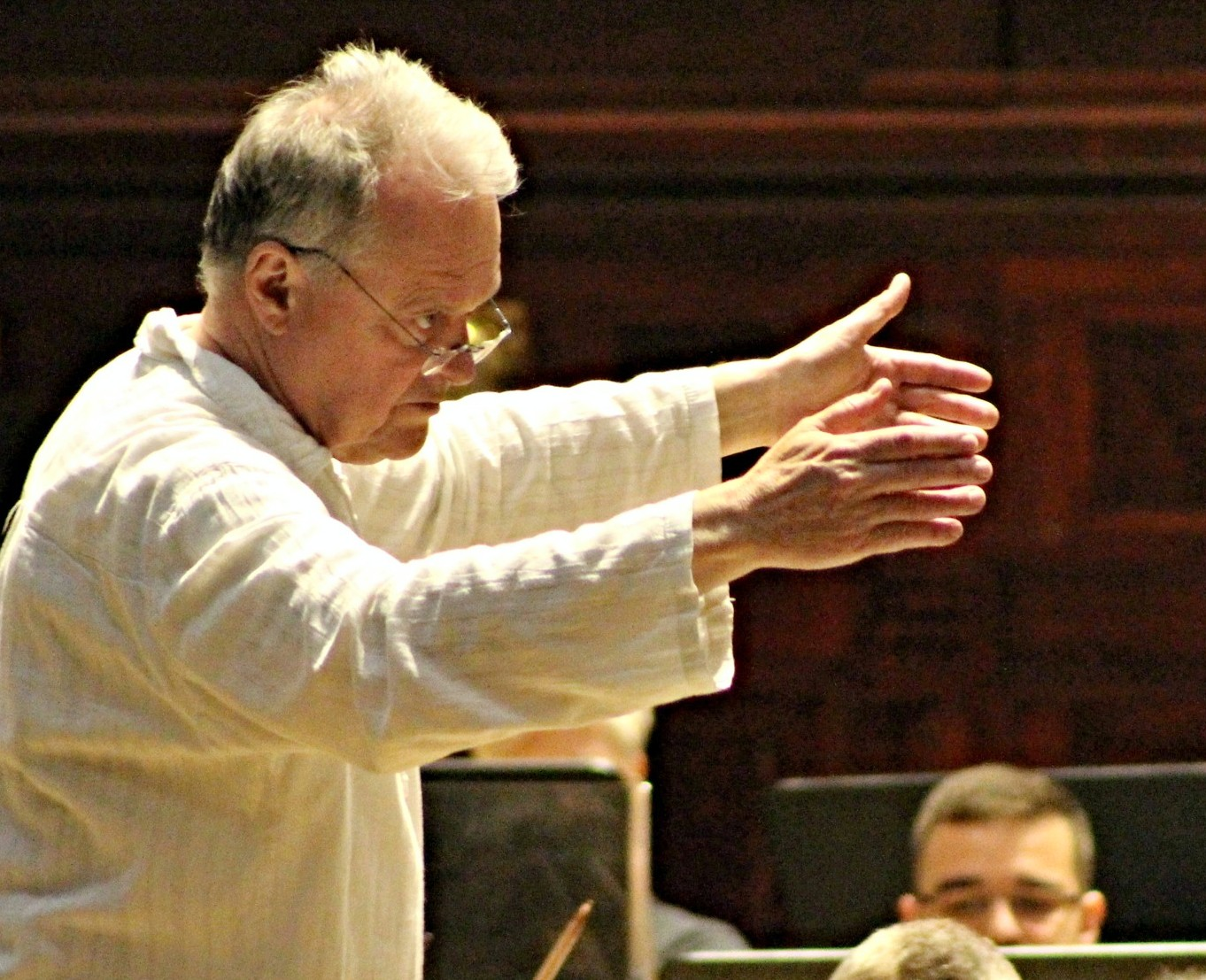
- Born: March 4, 1946 (age 80)
- Education: Prague Academy of Performing Arts; Plzeň Conservatory
- Occupations: Conductor; Violinist; Music pedagogue

Petr Vronský (born 4 March 1946) is a Czech conductor, violinist and music teacher. He was born to a musical family, his grandfather Bóža Wronski (1889–1953) was an operatic tenor, his father, Karel Vronský (1918–1999), was a first violinist in the Czech Philharmonic Orchestra.

Having initially studied violin at the Plzeň Conservatory until 1967, Vronský continued his education at Prague's Academy of Performing Arts studying under Robert Brock, Alois Klíma, Bohumír Liška and Jindřich Rohan. He graduated from the Academy's conducting course in 1972.

After completing his studies, he joined the Pilsen Opera at the J. K. Tyl Theatre where he held the post of conductor. From 1983 to 1991 he conducted the Brno Philharmonic Orchestra. He was chief conductor of the Moravian Philharmonic from 2005 to 2018.

Vronský taught at the Janáček Academy of Performing Arts in Brno. He went on to lecture in conducting at the Faculty of Music at Prague’s Academy of Performing Arts where conductor Tomáš Brauner was among his students.

In 2016, Vronský was awarded the Lifelong Musical Achievement Award.

Preceded by František Jílek	Principal Conductors, Brno Philharmonic Orchestra; 1978–1991	Succeeded by Leoš Svárovský
