= Daniel Harding =

British conductor

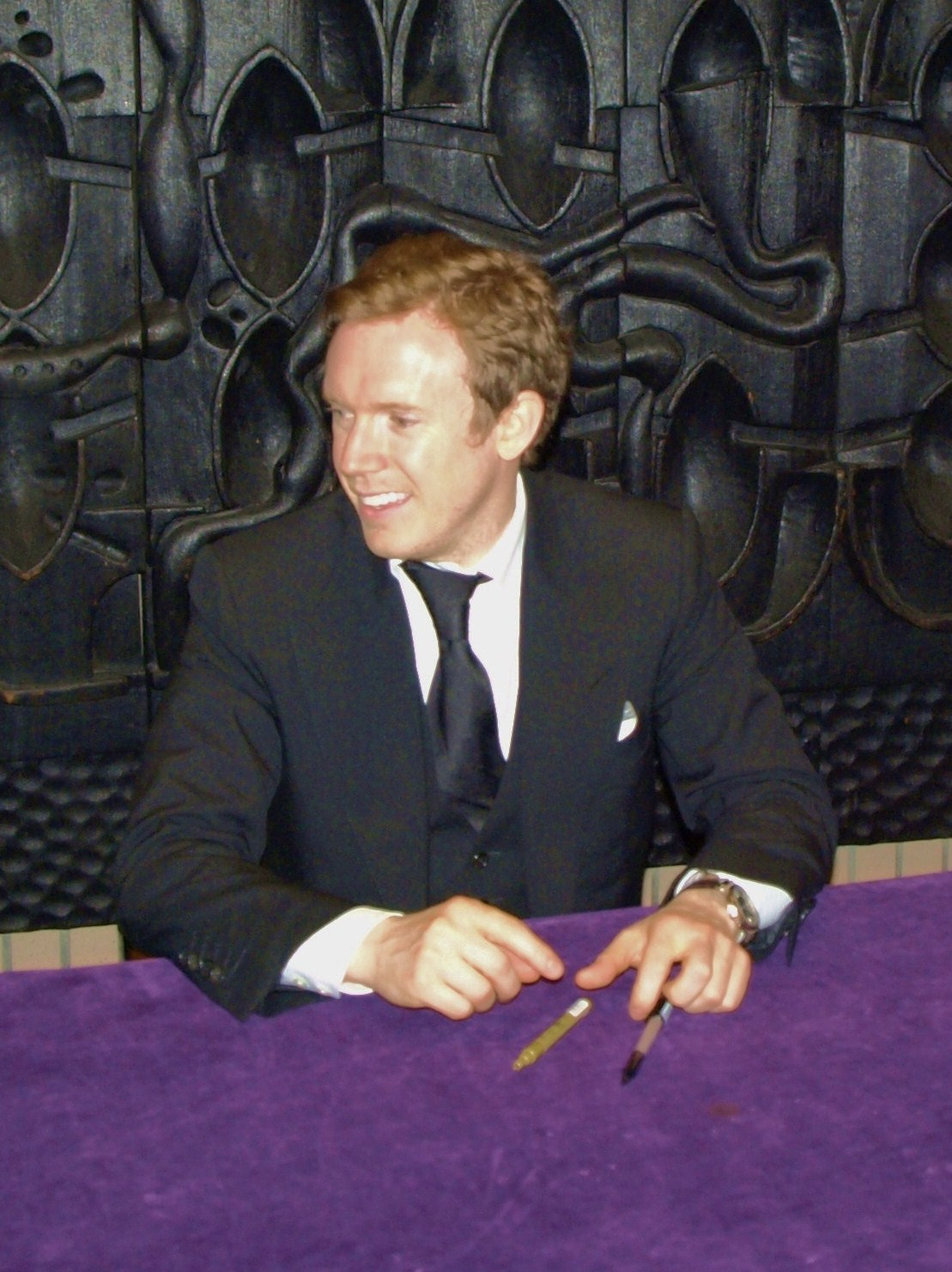
Daniel Harding (2011)

Daniel John Harding CBE (born 31 August 1975) is a British conductor. He is music director of the Orchestra dell'Accademia Nazionale di Santa Cecilia and has been named music director of the Los Angeles Philharmonic beginning with the 2027–2028 season. He is also a part-time pilot for Air France.

== Early life ==
Harding was born in Oxford. He studied trumpet at Chetham's School of Music and was a member of the National Youth Orchestra at age 13. At age 17, Harding assembled a group of musicians to perform Arnold Schoenberg's Pierrot lunaire, and sent a tape of the performance to Simon Rattle in Birmingham. After listening to the tape, Rattle hired Harding as his assistant at the City of Birmingham Symphony Orchestra for a year, from 1993 to 1994.

== Career ==
In 1994, Harding entered the University of Cambridge, but after his first year, Claudio Abbado named him his assistant with the Berlin Philharmonic Orchestra. Harding first conducted the Berlin Philharmonic at age 21. At the time of his first conducting appearance at The Proms in 1996, he was then the youngest conductor ever to appear there. Harding has stated that he has never had formal conducting lessons. He is a former Seiji Ozawa Fellow in conducting at Tanglewood Music Center.

In 1997, Harding made his US conducting debut as music director of the Ojai Music Festival alongside pianist Emanuel Ax, leading the Los Angeles Philharmonic. Less than a year later, he made his regular season debut with the LA Philharmonic at the Dorothy Chandler Pavilion in February 1998.

Harding has been music director of the Trondheim Symphony Orchestra (1997–2000), the Deutsche Kammerphilharmonie Bremen (1999–2003) and the Mahler Chamber Orchestra (2003–2008). He holds the title of conductor laureate with the Mahler Chamber Orchestra. He conducted Idomeneo for the 2005 opening night at La Scala, substituting for Riccardo Muti following his resignation.

In 2004, Harding was appointed principal guest conductor of the London Symphony Orchestra (LSO), effective 2006. He took on the management of the Sound Adventures program for new compositions. With the LSO, he has conducted a recording of the opera Billy Budd for EMI Classics. He became the Principal Conductor of the Swedish Radio Symphony Orchestra in 2007. In September 2009, his contract as the orchestra's principal conductor was extended through 2012. In April 2013, the orchestra extended Harding's contract to 2015. With the LSO he has recorded for the Sony Classical label. In June 2015, the Orchestre de Paris announced Harding's appointment as its 9th principal conductor, effective September 2016. Harding concluded his tenure at the Orchestre de Paris with the close of the 2018–2019 season. In October 2018, the Swedish Radio Symphony Orchestra announced the extension of Harding's contract as principal conductor through 2023, granting him the new title of konstnärlig ledare (artistic leader). In November 2021, the orchestra announced the extension of Harding's contract through 2025. Harding concluded his tenure with the Swedish Radio Symphony Orchestra at the close of the 2024–2025 season.

In September 2010, Harding took the title of music partner of the New Japan Philharmonic. In April 2012, Harding became artistic director of the Ohga Hall in Karuizawa, Japan.

In 2021, Harding conducted the annual Vienna Philharmonic Summer Night Concert for the first time, the first British conductor to lead that concert. In March 2023, the Orchestra dell'Accademia Nazionale di Santa Cecilia announced Harding's appointment as its next music director, effective with the 2024–2025 season, with an initial contract of five seasons.

In May 2026, the Los Angeles Philharmonic announced that Harding will become the orchestra's music director beginning with the 2027–2028 season.

== Personal life ==
Harding has two children, Adele and George, from his past marriage to Béatrice Muthelet, a violist and co-principal violist of the Mahler Chamber Orchestra. The marriage ended in divorce. Harding is a particular fan of the football club Manchester United.

Harding is a licensed airline pilot. He planned to take a sabbatical from conducting in 2020 to work full-time as a commercial pilot with Air France, but the COVID-19 pandemic forced him to put that plan on hold. Since 2022, he has piloted Airbus planes on medium-haul flights for about one week per month.

Harding is a foreign member of the Royal Swedish Academy of Music. He was appointed a Commander of the Order of the British Empire (CBE) in the 2021 New Year Honours for services to music.

Cultural offices
Preceded by Thomas Hengelbrock	Music Director, Deutsche Kammerphilharmonie, Bremen; 1999–2003	Succeeded by Paavo Järvi
Preceded by Manfred Honeck	Principal Conductor, Swedish Radio Symphony Orchestra; 2007–2025	Succeeded by Andrés Orozco-Estrada (designate, effective 2026)
