= Hot 1027 =

- South Africa
- Broadcast area: Johannesburg
- Frequency: 102.7 MHz

Programming
- Format: Old Skool, R&B, and Classical music

Ownership
- Owner: The Professional Consortium

History
- First air date: 1 September 1997

Links
- Website: www.hot1027.co.za

Hot 1027 is a South African commercial radio station based in Johannesburg. Formerly known as Classic FM 102.7, the station was founded in 1997 and catered exclusively to a classical music audience. Following a business rescue process, the station was acquired by a new owner and rebranded as Hot 1027 on 1 July 2021, adopting a hybrid format of old-school, R&B, and classical music.

Since its relaunch, the station has seen significant audience growth and has won multiple international and local awards.

== History ==
Classic FM was founded in 1997. In October 2019, the station, then known as Classic 1027 FM, was placed in business rescue, which led to some staff retrenchments. A bid from The Professional Consortium, a group of media and business specialists, was accepted by the business rescue practitioner, allowing the station to continue operating.

On 30 April 2021, the Independent Communications Authority of South Africa (ICASA) approved the station's application to amend its broadcasting licence. This amendment facilitated a change in format, and the station officially rebranded as Hot 1027 on 1 July 2021.

== Programming and Format ==
Under its amended ICASA licence, Hot 1027 is mandated to broadcast a format comprising 50% classical music and 50% "Old Skool and R&B" music. The station implements this with a split schedule: daytime programming (5 a.m. to 7 p.m.) primarily features old-school and R&B hits, while the evening and overnight hours are dedicated to classical music.

== Audience and growth ==
Since its 2021 relaunch, Hot 1027 has experienced rapid audience growth. According to a 2024 BrandMapp survey, the station's audience reached approximately 613,000 listeners, up from 316,000 the previous year. Data from the Broadcast Research Council (BRC) of South Africa showed an audience of 201,000, representing a 148% increase from the 81,000 reported in January 2023.

In 2025, a report by News24 and international research firm Statista recognised Hot 1027 as South Africa's fastest-growing media company.

== Management ==
The station is led by Managing Director Lloyd Madurai, who has an extensive career in South African radio, including roles at East Coast Radio, Gagasi FM, 94.7 Highveld Stereo, and Jacaranda FM. In 2018, he was inducted into the South African Radio Hall of Fame. The station's Head of News is Tara Penny, who was named Woman in Media and the overall Woman of Stature for 2025 at the Woman of Stature Awards.

== Hot Cares ==
Hot Cares is the station's non-profit corporate social investment (CSI) arm. It is a registered non-profit company with Public Benefit Organisation (PBO) status and focuses its work on humanitarian, medical, educational, and animal welfare initiatives. In November 2022, its annual "Teddython" fundraiser raised R8.9 million in cash, goods, and services in just over 12 hours.

== Awards and recognition ==
Hot 1027 has received multiple accolades at the international New York Festivals Radio Awards:

- 2023: The station received seven finalist nominations.
- 2024: Awarded a bronze medal in the Best News Report/Feature: Human Interest category for a series titled 'Beginner's Guide to Online Dating', produced by head of news, Tara Penny.
- 2025: Won a Bronze Award in the News Documentary category for its mental health series 'Derailed', and a Finalist Award in the Human-Interest Feature category for 'Blindspot', an investigative piece on Johannesburg's traffic light system.

The station has been recognised in the local Best of Joburg Readers' Choice Awards. In 2024, it was named 'Best Local Radio Station' for the third consecutive year. The station's breakfast show won 'Best Local Radio Show' for the second year in a row.

== Broadcasting ==
Hot 1027 broadcasts in English 24/7 on the 102.7 MHz frequency to the Greater Johannesburg area. It is also available nationally on DStv channel 822 and via online streaming.
