= Theodore Papakonstantinou =

Theodore Papakonstantinou (Greek: Θεόδωρος Παπακωνσταντίνου; June 15, 1948 – October 23, 1969) was a Greek composer, born in Thessaloniki, Greece. He was the third child and the youngest of his two siblings, Vasilis and Theano. Influenced by his mother Erato and his grandfather Theodore Varveris he was drawn to music, exhibiting his musical inclination from an early age.

== Early life and education ==
He became familiar with Byzantine music as a child and together with his brother Vasilis (first cantor) chanted at St. Demetrius church at Sikies from 1958 till 1960 and at Aghia Triada (Holy Trinity) church in Thessaloniki from 1961 on. The family’s dire financial situation which followed his father’s serious accident prevented him from commencing his musical studies early on in life. He received his first music lessons from a young blind musician and friend at the School for the Blind in Thessaloniki. Theodore tutored him in his high school subjects in return for piano instruction and solfege.

In 1963, after having acquired his first musical knowledge of the Western European musical tradition, at the age of 15 he attended the “Thessaloniki Conservatory” (now called “State Conservatory of Thessaloniki”). Theodore Papaconstantinou studied under the following music teachers: I. Sideris (Instrumentation) Tasos Pappas (Music theory, Choir) Fani Aidali (Monody) Ch. Kalaitzis (Piano) Solon Michailidis (Counterpoint, Music morphology)

== Career and compositions ==
In 1966, he began collaborating with Antonis Kontogeorgiou at the XMO Choir (Christian Student Group Children’s Choir of Thessaloniki) until he found his own choir, the “Aghia Triada (Holy Trinity) Children’s Choir” of Thessaloniki. The year 1967 proved to be exceptionally fruitful for Theodore Papaconstantinou as he received his degree in Harmony with the highest possible distinction and his degree in Vocal Studies with distinction. It was also the year that the “Aghia Triada (Holy Trinity) Children’s Choir” was founded, initially to replace the cantors at the 2nd Sunday Mass at Aghia Triada (Holy Trinity) church. Theodore Papaconstantinou taught the first choir members (only boys at the time). His calling in composition led him to harmonize and arrange the liturgy of St. John the Chrysostome for a 4-voice choir (S.A.T.B.). However, during that same year he composed and presented other significant musical works:

* Άγιε μου Γιάννη Συριανέ / My Saint John Syriane - choral arrangement

- Αναστάσεως ημέρα/ Χριστός Ανέστη / Easter Day hymn Christ is Risen
- Εγκώμια της Μεγάλης Παρασκευής / Praises of Good Friday - Good Friday evening service arrangement for a 4-voice choir
- Είμ΄ένα μικρό παιδάκι / I'm a little kid - choral arrangement
- Η πηγή του χωριού μου / The source of my village - choral arrangement
- Θυμήσου όπου πας / Remember where you are going - harmonisation
- Κατασκηνωτικό / Camping - choral arrangement
- Κύριε Ελέησον / Lord, have mercy
- Τα πήρανε τα πρόβατα / They got the sheep - choral arrangement
- Το τραγούδι των παιδιών / Children's song
- Χριστός γεννάται, δοξάσατε / Christ is born, you glorified - Byzantine Christmas hymn

== Death and legacy ==
In 1968 he was called to do his military service. On October 23, 1969, during his first night transferred to Cyprus, he died due to brain aneurysm at the age of 21. After his sudden death, his brother Vasilis Papaconstantinou took over his choir. For the next 50 years, the Aghia Triada children’s choir has been chanting the 2nd Sunday Mass and performing a wide repertoire of choral music (both classical and contemporary) in Greece and Europe, being distinguished as one of the best Greek children’s choirs.
