= Zunduin Khangal =

Mongolian musician

Zunduin Khangal (Mongolian: Зундуйн Хангал; 1948–1996) was a Mongolian classical composer of European music.

He attended the Music School 1968–1970 in Almaty. Between 1970 and 1976 he studied at the Sverdlovsk Conservatory in the Soviet Union. He is best known for his string quartet (1972), Violin Concerto (1974) and ballet music "Ėrdėnėsijn Uul" (Эрдэнэсийн Уул, Treasure Mountain) (1982). He composed the music for 20 films. In 2000 he was awarded the Mongolian State Prize.
