= Camargo Foundation =

Residency for artists and scholars in Cassis, France

- Fondation Camargo
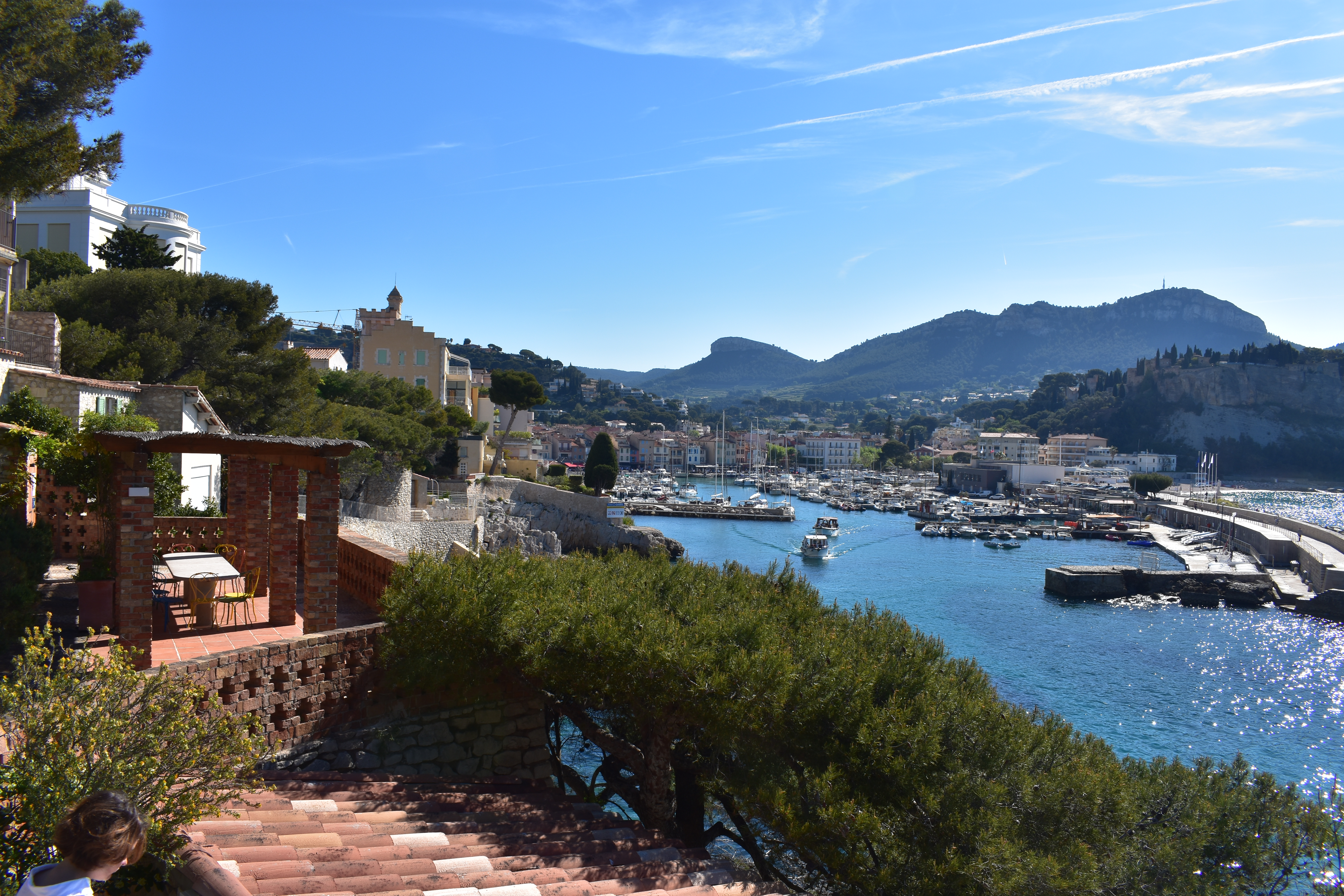
- The town of Cassis seen from the Camargo Foundation theatre
- Established: 1967
- Location: Cassis, Bouches-de-Rhône, France
- Coordinates: 43.2141755°N 5.5301589°E
- Type: Research center Artists' Residency
- Founder: Jerome Hill
- Director: Julie Chénot
- Website: camargofoundation.org/en/

The Camargo Foundation (French: Fondation Camargo) is a residency program for artists, scholars and public intellectuals located in Cassis, France. The foundation was established by American filmmaker and philanthropist Jerome Hill in 1967. Approximately fourteen scholars and artists are selected each year to receive a residential fellowship at the foundation. Prizes have been awarded annually since 1971.

In 2018, the Camargo Foundation campus was awarded the designation of Maison des Illustres, issued by the French Ministry of Culture to recognize the homes of people who have contributed to history, the arts and culture in general in France.

== Fellows and residents ==
The full list of former fellows and residents can be viewed in the alumni directory of the Camargo Foundation.

== Residents in the 1970s ==
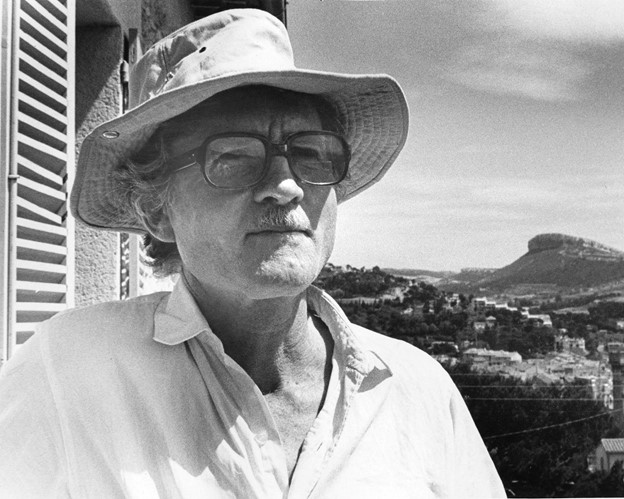
Environmentalist Richard Gordon Lillard in Cassis

Year	Country	Resident
1971	USA	Mercer Cook, professor of French and diplomat who served as U.S. Ambassador to Senegal, Gambia, and Niger
1973	USA	Francis R. Walton, classical scholar and former director of the Gennadius Library at the American School of Classical Studies at Athens
1974	USA	Ihab Hassan, literary theorist
1974	USA	Wallace Fowlie, writer and professor of literature
1974	USA	Victor Brombert, philologist (1923–2024)
1977	USA	Raymond Federman, poet
1977	USA	Robert Xavier Rodriguez, classical composer (born 1946)
1977	USA	Richard Gordon Lillard, author, educator, environmentalist (1909–1990)
1978	USA	David T. Hanson, photographer (born 1948)
1978	USA	Domenic Cretara, painter (1946–2017)
1979	USA	Jesse R. Pitts, sociologist (1921–2003)
1979	USA	Oliva Blanchette, philosopher (1929–2021)

== Residents in the 1980s ==
"Later in the year [1987], I went to the South to begin my artist’s residency at the Camargo Foundation, in Cassis, a town on the sea not far from Marseille. The writer Virginia Woolf, the pointillist Paul Signac, the fauvists André Derain and Raoul Dufy, and the Provençal poet Frédéric Mistral, had spent extended periods of time in Cassis. I took day trips from Cassis to Arles, Aix, Marseille, and Nice, and could process my film in the simple darkroom that was supplied to me."

— Mark Steinmetz, photographer

Year	Country	Resident
1980	USA	James R. Lawler, Australian-French academic (1929–2013)
1980	USA	Miriam Beerman, painter and printmaker (1923–2022)
1980	USA	Serge Gavronsky, poet and translator (born 1932)
1981	USA	Germaine Brée, literary scholar (1907–2001)
1981	USA	Linda Plotkin, printmaker
1981	USA	Christopher Yavelow, classical composer
1981	USA	Bernard Benstock, literary critic and English professor
1982	USA	Mark Axelrod, writer and academic
1983	USA	Ann McMillan, composer and broadcaster (1923–1994)
1983	USA	Barry Bergdoll, art historian and former Chief Curator of Architecture and Design at the Museum of Modern Art (MoMA)
1983	USA	Dudley Andrew, film theorist
1984	USA	Robert Carl, composer
1984	USA	Jonathan Culler, novelist and critic
1984	USA	Elizabeth Topham Kennan, 15th president of Mount Holyoke College
1984	USA	Herbert Blau, director and theoretician of performance (1926–2013)
1984	USA	Kathleen Woodward, cultural critic and higher education leader
1985	USA	Henry Sussman, literary scholar
1985	USA	Carol Jacobs, literary scholar
1985	USA	Patricia Blake, editor and confidante of Albert Camus
1985	USA	Richard Wilbur, two-time Pulitzer Prize for Poetry winner and former U.S. Poet Laureate
1985	USA	Patrice Higonnet, professor
1985	USA	Margaret Higonnet, author and historian (b. 1941)
1985	USA	Birutė Ciplijauskaitė, literary scholar and translator
1985	USA	Rudolph Binion, historian (1927–2011)
1986	USA	Alec Stone Sweet, political scientist and jurist
1986	USA	Robert Wolke, chemist (1928–2021)
1986	USA	William Jay Smith, poet (1918–2015)
1986	USA	Joel Hoffman, composer
1987	USA	Mark Steinmetz, photographer
1987	USA	Philip Lasser, classical composer (born 1963)
1987	USA	Curtis Harnack, writer
1987	USA	Hortense Calisher, novelist and former president of the American Academy of Arts and Letters
1987	USA	Timothy Tackett, historian (born 1945)
1988	USA	Judith Roode, artist and teacher (1943–2018)
1988	USA	Michael Lewis-Beck, political scientist (born 1943)
1988	USA	Renée Riese Hubert, writer and academic (1916–2005)
1988	England	David Bradby, drama & theatre academic (1942–2011)
1989	USA	Daron Hagen, composer, writer, and filmmaker (born 1961)
1989	USA	Henri Cole, poet (born 1956)
1989	USA	William Berry, author, artist, and professor of art

== Residents in the 1990s ==
« En 1999, lauréate d'une bourse de la Fondation Camargo, je m'installais à Cassis. Je voulais retrouver les lieux d'inspiration de Bonnard, de Matisse, de Seurat... J'étais concentrée sur mon projet quand la guerre au Kosovo m'atteignit. La lumière si belle et si éblouissante accentuait mon sentiment de l'absurde et mon désarroi. »

"In 1999, after getting a fellowship from the Camargo Foundation, I settled into Cassis. I wanted to discover the places that inspired Bonnard, Matisse, Seurat....I was focused on my project when I learned about the war in Kosovo. The light, so beautiful and so dazzling, heightened my sense of absurdity and dismay."

— Barbara Hammer, filmmaker

Year	Country	Resident
1990	USA	Sheila Silver, composer (born 1946)
1990	USA	James Salter, writer (1925–2015)
1990	USA	Linda Bouchard, composer and conductor
1990	Canada	Michael Bishop, academic
1990	USA	Henry Sussman, literary scholar
1990	USA	Alan Spitzer, historian (1925–2024)
1991	USA	Carol E. Barnett, composer (born 1949)
1991	USA	Josette Urso, visual artist
1991	USA	B. H. Friedman, author and art critic
1992	USA	Ricardo Zohn-Muldoon, Mexican-American composer
1992	USA	Cole Swensen, poet (born 1955)
1992	USA	Jack Kolbert, educator and French teacher (1927-2005)
1992	USA	Barbara Cooper, sculptor
1992	USA	Lynne Huffer, philosophy professor
1992	USA	Harold Blumenfeld, composer
1993	USA	Robert Carl, composer
1993	USA	Joan Benson, keyboardist (1925–2020)
1993	Canada	Malcolm Forsyth, South African-Canadian musician (1936–2011)
1993	USA	Allan Havis, playwright
1993	USA	Margaret Weitz, academic (1929–2025)
1994	USA	Jacques Servin, activist artist and one of the leading members of The Yes Men
1994	USA	Paul Moravec, composer (born 1957) and winner of a 2004 Pulitzer Prize for Music for his composition Tempest Fantasy
1994	USA	Frede Jensen, Romance philologist
1994	USA	Bill Burgwinkle, medievalist and French scholar
1994	USA	Laura Volkerding, photographer
1994	USA	Michael Lewis-Beck, political scientist (born 1943)
1995	USA	David Ray (poet), poet (1932–2024)
1995	Canada	Pierre Ouellet, writer
1995	USA	Paul Jankowski, historian (born 1950)
1995	USA	Richard Watson, philosopher, speleologist, and author (1931–2019)
1996	USA	Jane Marcus, feminist scholar (1938–2015)
1996	USA	Peter Sagal, playwright and host of the National Public Radio (NPR) show Wait Wait... Don't Tell Me!
1996	USA	Canan Tolon, Turkish-born artist (born 1955)
1996	USA	Jim Barnes (writer), writer and 2009-10 Oklahoma Poet Laureate
1997	USA	Adam Rapp, novelist and playwright
1997	USA	Bonnie Effros, historian of archaeology and 19th century France
1997	USA	Barbara K. Altmann, literature professor and 16th president of Franklin & Marshall College
1997	USA	John Anthony Lennon, classical composer
1997	USA	Derek Attridge, South African-born literary scholar
1998	USA	Dudley Andrew, film theorist
1998	USA	Paul La Farge, novelist and essayist
1998	USA	Kevin Kopelson, literary critic
1998	USA	Nathan Currier, composer
1998	USA	Karen Volkman, poet
1998	USA	Endi E. Poskovic, visual artist and printmaker
1999	USA	Ellen Handler Spitz, professor of children, psychology and the arts
1999	USA	Tracy Denean Sharpley-Whiting, feminist scholar
1999	USA	Carlos Sanchez-Gutierrez, composer
1999	USA	Christopher Middleton, British poet and translator (1926–2015)
1999	USA	Barbara Hammer, feminist film director, producer, writer, and cinematographer. She developed her award-winning film Resisting Paradise while in residence.
1999	USA	Richard Foerster, poet
1999	USA	Rudolph Binion, historian (1927–2011)

== Residents in the 2000s ==
American Composer Pauline Oliveros in the Camargo Foundation theatre in 2008.

"During a residency at the Camargo Foundation on the coast of Southern France, I was looking out my studio window and was struck with the realization that 65 years earlier my mother had been aboard a Red Cross Ship at that very location (...) There was a small red sailboat anchored beyond my window that I filmed every day as it endured dramatic storms, punishing surf, and sunny calm days. Throughout my five months at the Camargo Foundation, I stared through the camera at the red boat trying to imagine my mother’s experience during WWII."

— Jeanne C. Finley, artist

Year	Country	Resident
2000	USA	Karen McCoy, visual artist
2000	USA	William Franke, academic and philosopher
2000	USA	Richard Festinger, composer of contemporary classical music
2000	England	David Bradby, theatre academic and Chevalier des Arts et des Lettres
2000	USA	Ezra Sims, one of the pioneers in the field of microtonal composition
2000	USA	Daniel W. Gade, professor of Geography
2001	USA	Myriam J. A. Chancy, Haitian-Canadian-American writer
2001	USA	Patricia Hampl, memoirist, writer, lecturer, and educator
2001	USA	Eddy L. Harris, writer and filmmaker (born 1956)
2001	USA	Greg Hewett, poet, novelist, and professor
2001	USA	Leighton Pierce, experimental filmmaker
2002	USA	Lynn Freed, South African-born writer
2002	USA	Susan Harbage Page, Photographer and visual artist
2002	USA	Jay Reise, composer
2002	USA	Garrett Stewart, literary and film theorist
2002	USA	Henry Sussman, literary scholar
2002	USA	Julia Watson, literary scholar focusing on the study of autobiography
2003	USA	Cusi Cram, dramatist
2003	USA	Laird Hunt, writer, translater and academic
2003	USA	Melissa Kirsch, author
2003	USA	Alastair Minnis, Northern Irish literary critic and historian of ideas
2003	USA	Dorothy Noyes, folklorist and ethnologist
2004	Australia	Robert Aldrich, historian and writer
2004	England	David Bradby, British drama and theatre academic
2004	USA	Angie Cruz, novelist
2004	USA	Samantha Gillison, writer
2004	USA	Donald Harris, composer
2004	USA	Joyce Kozloff, artist and co-founder of the Guerilla Girls
2004	USA	Brenda Marie Osbey, poet
2005	USA	Constance Hoffman Berman, medievalist
2005	USA	Leslie Brody, author
2005	USA	Brian Evenson, academic and writer of both literary fiction and popular fiction
2005	USA	Lee Hyla, classical music composer
2005	Australia	Gail Jones, Australian novelist and academic
2005	USA	Jane Lackey, artist
2005	USA	Glori Simmons, poet and short story writer
2005	USA	Rosemary Sullivan, Canadian poet, biographer, and anthologist
2006	Chili	Claudia Aravena Abughosh, visual artist
2006	USA	Jen Bervin, poet and visual artist
2006	USA	Veronica Chambers, Afro-Latina author, teacher, and magazine executive
2006	England	Michael Edwards, composer
2006	USA	Paul Elwood, classical composer
2006	USA	Sharon Kinoshita, professor of Medieval literature
2006	USA	Vera Klement, artist
2006	Australia	Brian Nelson (literature professor), literature professor
2007	USA	Frank Baumgartner, political scientist
2007	USA	Edwin M. Duval, literary scholar
2007	USA	Fenton Johnson, writer and professor of English and LGBT Studies
2007	USA	Susan Kinsolving, poet
2007	USA	Karan Mahajan, Indian-American novelist, essayist, and critic
2007	USA	John McManus (author), novelist, short story writer, and youngest ever recipient of the Whiting Award
2007	USA	Laura McPhee, photographer
2007	USA	B. Ruby Rich, scholar and film critic known for coining the term "new queer cinema".
2007	USA	Katharina Rosenberger, Swiss composer and sound-artist
2008	USA	Meena Alexander, Indian poet, scholar, and writer
2008	USA	Jon Appleton, American composer and pioneer in electro-acoustic music
2008	USA	Tamar Diesendruck, composer
2008	USA	Jeanne C. Finley, artist
2008	USA	Jennifer Grotz, poet and translator
2008	Nigeria	Karen King-Aribisala, writer
2008	USA	W. Patrick McCray, historian
2008	USA	Pauline Oliveros, composer and musician (1932–2016)
2008	USA	Brenda Withers, playwright and actress
2009	Canada	Alia Al-Saji, Iraq-born philosophy professor
2009	USA	Patricia Alessandrini, composer
2009	USA	Catherine Chung, novelist
2009	USA	Rick Hilles, poet
2009	USA	Toril Moi, Norwegian academic
2009	USA	Kate Soper, composer

== Residents in the 2010s ==
Year	Program	Country	Resident
2010	Camargo Fellowship	USA	Ben Kiernan, Australian-born American historian
2010	Camargo Fellowship	USA	Sandra Gilbert, literary critic and poet. Known for co-authoring the second-wave feminist text The Madwoman in the Attic (1979).
2011	Camargo Fellowship	USA	Eric Moe, composer
2011	Camargo Fellowship	USA	David Rakowski, typeface designer and composer who has been a finalist twice for the Pulitzer Prize for Music
2014	Camargo Fellowship	Ukraine	Natalka Bilotserkivets, Ukrainian poet and translator
2014	Parc national des Calanques	France	Gilles Clément, French gardener, garden designer and writer
2014	Bread Loaf Bakeless at Camargo	USA	JoAnn Balingit, 16th poet laureate of Delaware
2014	Camargo Fellowship	USA	Alice Kaplan, American scholar of French literature
2015	Camargo Fellowship	USA	Lee Breuer, theatre director
2015	Camargo Fellowship	China	Wen Hui, dancer and choreographer
2016	Jerome@Camargo	USA	Nicholas Boggs, author of Baldwin: A Love Story, for which he did research while in residence at Camargo.
2016	Camargo Fellowship	Palestine	Rula Halawani, photographer and educator
2017	Camargo Fellowship	USA	Faye Driscoll, dancer and choreographer
2017	Jerome@Camargo	USA	Amir ElSaffar, jazz musician
2017	Marseille Jazz Festival des cinq continents	USA	Erik Truffaz, jazz trumpeter
2018	Festival de Marseille	Senegal	Felwine Sarr, writer and musician
2018	Camargo Fellowship	Morocco	Abdallah Zrika, poet

== Residents in the 2020s ==
Year	Program	Country	Resident
2021	Camargo Fellowship	USA	Ganavya, Indian and American singer, songwriter, and musician
2021	Au Long Cours	France	Dorothée Munyaneza, British-Rwandan singer, actress, dancer and choreographer
2022	Jerome@Camargo	USA	Sage Ni'Ja Whitson, artist, performer, writer and the founder/artistic director of The NWA Project
2023	Camargo Fellowship	Palestine	Kamal Aljafari, filmmaker and artist
2023	Camargo Fellowship	USA	Eve Beglarian, composer and musician
2023	Au Long Cours	USA	Dread Scott and Jenny Polak, artists
2024	Impromptus	France	Adèle Haenel, author and activist
2026	Habiter Le Monde	USA	Amitav Ghosh, novelist and winner of the 54th Jnanpith Award, India's highest literary honour
