= Madisonian model =

Structure of government

The Madisonian model is a structure of government in which the powers of the government are separated into three branches: executive, legislative, and judicial. This came about because the delegates saw the need to structure the government in such a way to prevent the imposition of tyranny by either majority or minority. James Madison proposed this governmental scheme so that the power and influence of each branch would be balanced by those of the others. The separation of powers is a result of Congress passing laws, the president enforcing laws, and the courts interpreting the laws. The three branches of government are independent from each other, yet cooperate by necessity. In the Federalist Paper No. 51, Madison illustrated his beliefs on how a balance in the power was necessary for a government to exist.

These ideas originated in the work of French philosopher Baron de Montesquieu who described these concepts in his book The Spirit of the Laws (1748). Here Montesquieu explained how these checks on powers were efficient in preventing tyranny.

== Presidential philosophy ==
Madison, as a major contributor to the authoring of the United States Constitution himself defined much of the structure of the government of the United States, and thus the power of the federal executive. As the fourth President of the United States Madison also exhibited his own principles regarding presidential conduct and the execution of powers. Foremost of these powers are:

- Nomination of federal officers
- Signing of congressional legislation into law
- Negotiation of treaties as head of government and of state
- Commander in Chief of the military

== Madison's Dilemma ==
Madison's dilemma refers to the debate regarding how institutions should be designed in order to balance the tension between limited and effective government. Madison was concerned with how political institutions can limit government power in order to preserve individual rights and freedoms and prevent tyranny, while also creating a government capable of accomplishing goals and implementing policy. The dilemma that arises is how to strike a balance between these two principles.

There are four constitutional rules that concern how political power can be concentrated and dispersed.

1. The first: Unitarianism, where the constitution grants central government exclusive and final authority over policy making across entire national territory and whose power supersedes subnational governments (concentrates power at national level), versus federalism, where power is dispersed throughout different levels of government within the nation.
2. The second concerns separation of political power. Presidentialism means that voters elect the executive and legislative branches separately. There are fixed terms, and branches of government must work in tandem to pass legislation; power is dispersed. Parliamentarianism is where voters directly elect legislature, which elects everyone else and neither the executive or legislature face a fixed term; power can be consolidated by the parliamentary majority. This is not a system of checks and balances.
3. The third rule is judicial review versus parliamentary supremacy. Judicial review gives courts power to invalidate laws which disperses political power.
4. The final rule concerns how electoral systems determine winners. Plurality rule means the candidate who receives the largest share of the votes in the district wins, even if that share is less than 50 percent plus one of the votes, which can allow for majority control of the legislature out of less than majority of votes. Majority rule requires winners to receive candidates must obtain a majority of 50 percent plus 1 of the votes in the district to win.

While the most common popular definition of democracy equates it with regular elections (minimalist view), another highly commonly accepted image of democracy identifies it with majority rule. Political theorist Robert Dahl's observed that there is no single theory of democracy, but many theories that include debates that go beyond the broad commitment to rule by the majority.

This struggle to both limit the potential of tyrannical government and create a functional government informed Madison's system of checks and balances on government power outlined in Federalist 51. In the paper, titled "The Structure of the Government Must Furnish the Proper Checks and Balances Between the Different Departments" Madison explains and defends the checks and balances system in the Constitution.

== See also ==
- Cognitive Madisonianism
