= Unica Zürn =

German author and artist of the 20th century

- Born: 6 July 1916; Berlin, Germany
- Died: 19 October 1970 (aged 54); Paris, France
- Known for: Painting

Unica Zürn (6 July 1916 – 19 October 1970) was a German author and artist. Zürn is remembered for her works of anagram poetry and automatic drawing and for her photographic collaborations with Hans Bellmer. An exhibition of Bellmer and Zürn's work took place at the Ubu Gallery in New York City in the spring of 2012.

== Biography ==
Born Nora Berta Unica Ruth Zürn, Unica was raised in a well-to-do family in Berlin-Grunewald. She idolized her mostly absent father, Willkomm Ralph Paul Zürn (b. 1874), a cavalry officer stationed in Africa (as well as a not particularly successful writer and editor), but had a contentious relationship with her mother, his third wife, Helene Pauline Heerdt. Unica also had an older brother, Horst (b. 1914), who she claimed sexually abused her when she was a young girl. Her parents divorced in 1930 and she left school shortly after.

Zürn began working at the German Film Agency Universum Film AG (UFA) during the Third Reich. She started as a steno-typist before being promoted to dramaturge. While the UFA produced all the Nazi propaganda films, Zürn primarily worked in a department creating animating commercials for products such as shoes and cigarettes. While she was not directly involved in the production of Nazi propaganda films and did not join the NSDAP, she did not openly disagree with Nazi politics until after the war was over. Despite the fact that it was the national film company, she supposedly remained ignorant of the atrocities being perpetrated by the Nazis, or at least to their extent, until she chanced upon an underground radio report describing the concentration camps in 1942. That same year she married a much older, wealthy man named Erich Laupenmühlen. Their first child, Katrin, was born in 1943 and their second, Christian, in 1945. In 1949, she and Erich divorced, and she lost custody of her children; she could not afford a lawyer nor did she have the means to provide for them.

For the next few years Zürn eked out a living writing short stories for newspapers and radio plays and became romantically involved with the painter Alexander Camaro. While writing, she spent time in the cabaret and jazz club Die Badewanne, which was the gathering place for artists in Berlin. Shortly after separating from Camaro in 1953, she met artist Hans Bellmer at an exhibition of his work at either the Maison de France or at the Galerie Springer in Berlin (accounts differ). Not long afterward, she moved with him to Paris, becoming his partner and model, most famously in a series of photographs that Bellmer took of Zürn bound tightly with rope. One of the "Unica Tied Up" works was exhibited in Bellmer's 1959 exhibit "Doll," and at times he seemed to conflate Zürn with the dolls of his obsession. Bellmer's intention was to transform the body into a landscape, altering the contours and creating additional "breasts" of flesh along the stomach. This fetishization of the female form is well documented among surrealists and Bellmer is known for comparing his fragmentation of the body with the fragmentation of a sentence.

In Paris, Zürn began experimenting with automatic drawing and anagrams, pursuits Bellmer had a longstanding interest in and encouraged her to pursue. These early works were collected in Hexentexte (1954). Between 1956 and 1964 she had four solo exhibitions of her drawings and her work was included in the "Exposition Internationale du Surréalisme." The couple frequented the city's surrealist and related artistic circles, becoming acquainted with Hans Arp, Victor Brauner, André Breton, Marcel Duchamp, Max Ernst, Man Ray, Joyce Mansour, André Pieyre de Mandiargues, and others. In 1957 she was introduced to Henri Michaux, who she identified as the "Jasmine Man", a fantasy figure of her childhood. She fell deeply in love with Michaux, and she joined him in several of his experiments with mescaline. These drug experiences may have precipitated her first mental crisis. In Magnifying Mirrors, Renée Riese Hubert describes Zürn's relationship with these artists within the context of her own career and warns against attributing Zürn's work to Bellmer by stating "Zürn's relationship with Bellmer can hardly account for her achievement as a writer and graphic artist, even though their encounter may have given a strong impetus to her creativity." While she was encouraged to participate by these artists, her work is not simply an extension of their objectives.

In 1960 Zürn experienced a psychotic episode. She found herself spellbound and hypnotised by Michaux, he appeared before her and ordered her to do things. She was eventually hospitalized, and after this she would be in and out of psychiatric hospitals for the rest of her life, for dissociative states and severe depression. Scholars now generally believe that she was schizophrenic, and that was indeed the initial diagnosis by staff doctors at Karl-Bonhoeffer-Heilstätten during her first hospitalization, though it was later retracted. It has also been suggested that rather than schizophrenia she may have had bipolar disorder with psychotic features.

After her first hospitalization and a suicide attempt, Zürn returned home in a wheelchair and destroyed most of her drawings and writings. She was subsequently taken to the Saint-Anne psychiatric clinic (which was associated with Jacques Lacan), where one of her doctors was Gaston Ferdière, who also treated Antonin Artaud. Despite her ongoing battle with mental illness, Zürn continued to produce work, and Michaux regularly brought her art supplies. Her psychological difficulties inspired much of her writing, above all Der Mann im Jasmin ("The Man in Jasmine") (1971).

In 1969 Hans Bellmer had a stroke which left him paralyzed, and the following year he told Zürn that according to his doctors' advice, he could no longer "be responsible for her". About six months later, in October 1970, the 54-year-old Zürn committed suicide by leaping from the window of the Paris apartment she had shared with Bellmer, while on a five-day leave from a mental hospital. She was buried at the Père Lachaise cemetery in Paris. At his request, Bellmer was buried next to her upon his death in 1975.

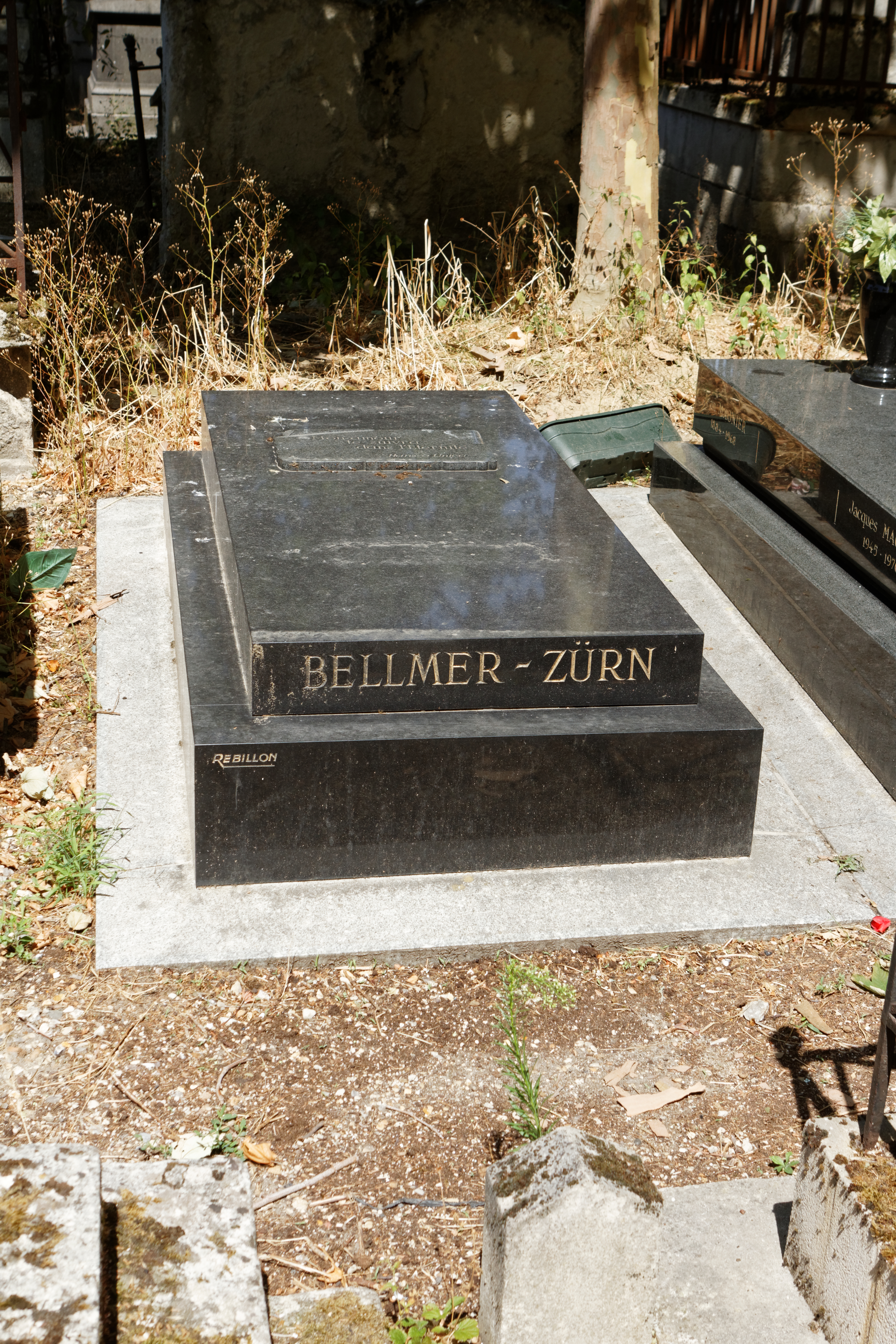
Bellmer and Zurn's gravestone at the Père-Lachaise cemetery.

== Writing ==
The writings and artwork for which Zürn is best known were produced during the 1950s and 60s. Zürn's relocation to Paris allowed her to write openly about issues such as domestic violence, abortion and sexual abuse. At the time, Germany was more conservative in voicing these issues, and denied Zürn's novel for publication. Her published texts include Hexentexte [The Witches' Texts] (1954), a book of anagram poetry accompanied by drawings, and the semi-autobiographical Dunkler Frühling [Dark Spring] (1967) and Der Mann im Jasmin [The Man of Jasmine] (1971), both of which have acquired a cult following in Paris. A violent aggression towards the female body is displayed in her stories, and they often consist mostly of internal dialogue.

The majority of her mature texts, if not explicitly autobiographical, closely resemble the author's life experiences. Dark Spring is a coming of age novel, of sorts, that follows a young woman as she has her first sexual encounters and experiences the first hints of mental illness. Several recurring archetypal characters appear in the book: the idealized father, the despised mother, and a troubled girl with masochistic tendencies. Disconcertingly, Zürn's death seems to be foreshadowed in the text as the protagonist of Dark Spring eventually commits suicide by jumping out of her bedroom window.

== Visual art ==
Zürn's visual works consist of oil paintings, watercolors, sketches, ink drawings and postcards. Though Zürn made a few paintings in the early 1950s, she primarily worked in ink, pencil, and gouache. Her fantastical, precisely rendered works are populated by imaginary plants, chimeras, and amorphous humanoid forms, sometimes with multiple faces emerging from their distorted bodies. Eyes are omnipresent and the drawings are resplendent with intricate and often repetitive marks. Violence and deformation are two distinctive qualities present in both the process of making and the final product of Zürn's visual work. She treated drawing as a process of creation dependent on a destruction or deconstruction of form that transforms an image. This reliance on deconstruction is present within Zürn's recreation of meaning and words in anagram writings. Unlike her writings, her graphic works haven't been as widely circulated outside of private collections, auctions, gallery storage rooms and national archives. Throughout her career, Zürn did not consistently advocate her visual works.

In 1953, Zürn had her first exhibition of these automatic drawings in the Galerie Le Soleil dans la Tête in Paris. Artists such as Breton, Man Ray, Hans Arp, Joyce Mansour, Victor Brauner and Gaston Bachelard attended this exhibition and her work was well received. Even though her exhibition did so well, Zürn still did not actively promote her visual works

One of her larger works, Untitled 1965 (ZURN 134) (), features human heads repeated and overlapping on the center of the page. The page is 65 x 50 cm, filled with overlapping circular lines that create a multitude of shifting portraits. She used primarily ink and gouache within the piece. Each face transforms and is morphed into another portrait of various sizes and expressions. All of these drawings layered together creates a monstrous entity, repetition manipulating and distorting the face. Zürn's layering of faces makes it impossible for the viewer to count the number of people present in the portrait without also finding an infinite number of new combinations of eyes, noses, lips and eyebrows that create new portraits.

Her method of drawing, the manual layering of lines over and over again, is similar to Zürn's process of anagram writing. Words and letters are removed in order to create new words and meaning. Many of Zürn's compositions in drawing share this same multifaceted quality, developing a visual language of destruction and transformation.

Zürn is one of the few women associated with the Surrealist movement; others include Leonora Carrington, Dorothea Tanning, Frida Kahlo, Kay Sage, Eileen Agar, Ithell Colquhoun, Leonor Fini, Toyen, Remei Varo, and Valentine Hugo.

== Published works ==
=== Books ===
- Hexentexte (1954)
- Im Hinterhalt (1963)
- Dunkler Frühling (1967)
- Die Trompeten von Jericho (1968)
- Der Mann im Jasmin (1971)
  - L'Homme-jasmin: impressions d'une malade mentale, trans. Ruth Henry and Robert Valançay (Gallimard, 1971). ISBN 978-2-07-028042-1
- Das Haus der Krankheiten (Brinkmann & Bose und Lilith, 1986)

=== English translations ===
- Dark Spring, trans. Caroline Rupprecht (Exact Change, 2000). ISBN 978-1-878972-30-9
- The Man of Jasmine and Other Texts, trans. Malcolm Green (Atlas, 1994). ISBN 978-0-947757-80-9
- The House of Illnesses: Stories and Pictures from a Case of Jaundice, trans. Malcolm Green (Atlas, 1993). ISBN 978-0-947757-71-7
- The Trumpets of Jericho, trans. Christina Svendsen (Wakefield Press, 2015). ISBN 978-1-939663-09-2

== Sources ==
- Sarah Palermo, Unica Zürn. Il diario della follia. Art Dossier n. 348, 11 2017. Ed. Giunti, Firenze, pp. 26–31
- Sarah Palermo, Unica Zürn. I doni della follia Outsider Art, Art Brut O.O.A. vol.8 - Glifo, 2014
- Bloomsbury Guide to Women's Literature
- Franziska Schneider, Unica Zürn: zu ihrem Leben und Werk, Deutsches Seminar, 1979
- Eric Robertson; Robert Vilain, eds. (1997). "Madness, Misogyny, and Feminism in Aesthetic Modernism". Yvan Goll--Claire Goll: texts and contexts. Rodopi. ISBN 978-90-420-0189-3.
- Katharine Conley (1996). "Through the Surrealist Looking glass". Automatic woman: the representation of woman in surrealism. University of Nebraska Press. p. 79. ISBN 978-0-8032-1474-3. "Unica Zürn."
- Marco Dotti, Hans Bellmer, Unica Zürn, Gaston Ferdière, in Saveria Chemotti, ed. (2009). Il ritratto dell'amante. L'artista, la musa, il simulacro. Il Poligrafo Press. ISBN 9788871156217.
- Suleiman, Susan (1988). "A Double Margin: Reflections on Women Writers and the Avant Garde in France". Yale University Press. Yale French Studies, No. 75, The Politics of Tradition: Placing Women in French Literature (1988) (75): 148–172. doi:10.2307/2930312. JSTOR 2930312.
- Marshall, Jennifer Cizik (1 March 2015). "The Semiotics of Schizophrenia: Unica Zurn's Artistry and Illness". Modern Language Studies. 30 (2 (Autumn, 2000)): 21–31. doi:10.2307/3195377. JSTOR 3195377.
- Francis, Jasmine (12 February 2013). "Two Halves: Unica Zurn". Sigliopress.com. Siglio. Archived from the original on 1 June 2016.
- "Unica Zurn". abcd-artbrut.net.
- Export, Valie; Eifler, Margret; Sager, Kurt (1988). "The Real and Its Double: The Body". Wayne State University Press. 11 (1 BODY // MASQUERADE): 3–7. JSTOR 41389105.
- Gary Indiana, "A Stone for Unica Zürn," Art in America (16 July 2009). http://www.artinamericamagazine.com/news-features/magazine/a-stone-for-unica-zurn/
- Mary Ann Caws and João Ribas, Unica Zürn: Dark Spring. Drawing Papers 86 (The Drawing Center, 2009). https://issuu.com/drawingcenter/docs/drawingpapers86_zurn
- Valery Oisteanu, "The Chimeras of Unica Zürn," artnet (15 March 2005). http://www.artnet.com/Magazine/reviews/oisteanu/oisteanu3-14-05.asp
- Hubert, Renée Riese. Magnifying Mirrors : Surrealism & Partnership Lincoln : University of Nebraska Press, 1994. P 159
- Plumer, Esra. Unica Zürn : art, writing and postwar surrealism. London : I.B. Tauris & Co. Ltd, 2016. pp 13, 15, 16, 17, 23, 80, 119
- Rosemont, Penelope. Surrealist Women: an internal anthology. Austin : University of Texas Press, 1998. P 313
- Rupprecht, Caroline. Subject to Delusions : narcissism, modernism, gender. Evanston III : Northwestern University Press, 2006. Pp 136, 137, 138
- Thüne, Eva-Maria (2016): "Wirst du dein Geheimnis sagen? Intertextuelle und semiotische Bezüge in Anagrammen von Unica Zürn", in Uta Degner & Martina Wörgötter, Hgg., Literarische Geheim- und Privatsprachen. Formen und Funktionen. Würzburg (Königshausen & Neumann), 103–124.
- Thüne, Eva-Maria (2012a): "Das Kabinett der Sonnengeflechte. Ein Beispiel von Text- und Bildbeziehung in Unica Zürns Das Haus der Krankheiten", in Franciszek Grucza; Anne Betten; Alexander Schwarz & Stanislaw Predota, Hgg., Akten des XII. IVG-Kongresses "Vielheit und Einheit der Germanistik weltweit". Bd. 4. Sprache in der Literatur / Kontakt und Transfer in der Sprach- und Literaturgeschichte des Mittelalters und der Frühen Neuzeit / Die niederländische Sprachwissenschaft - diachronisch und synchronisch, Frankfurt/M. et al. (Peter Lang), 133–138 [Publikationen der IVG; 4];
- Thüne, Eva-Maria (2008): Unica Zürn, Due diari. Introduzione e traduzione. Brescia (Edizioni l'Obliquo).
- Ubu Gallery. Accessed 16 March 2019. .
- Zürn, Unica. The Man of Jasmine. Translated by Malcom Green. London : Atlas, 1994. P 10
