= Carol Jacobs =

Carol Jacobs may refer to:

- Carol Lady Haynes, née Jacobs, Jamaican-Barbadian doctor and politician
- Carol Jacobs (academic), literary scholar
