= Kopelson =

Kopelson is a surname. Notable people with the surname include:

- Arnold Kopelson (1935–2018), American film producer
- Kevin Kopelson (born 1960), American literary critic and author
