= Norpoth =

Norpoth is a surname. Notable people with the surname include:

- Harald Norpoth (born 1942), West German middle and long-distance runner
- Helmut Norpoth (born 1943), American political scientist
