= I'm Hitting the Trail to Normandy: So Kiss Me Goodbye =

1917 song by Charles A. Snyder and Oscar Doctor

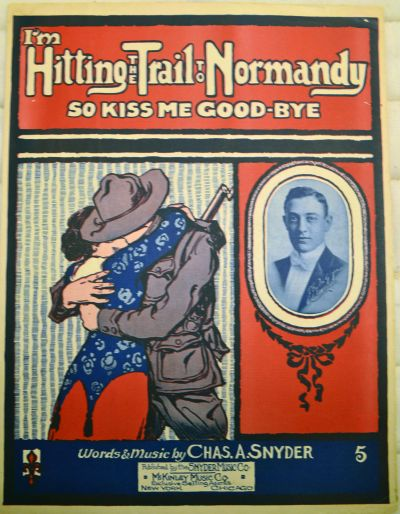
- Sheet music cover

Song
- Language: English
- Published: 1917
- Songwriter(s): Charles A. Snyder; Oscar Doctor

"I'm Hitting the Trail to Normandy: So Kiss Me Goodbye" is a World War I song written and composed by Charles A. Snyder and Oscar Doctor. The song was published in 1917 by Snyder Music Co. in New York City. The sheet music cover, illustrated by E. H. Pfeiffer, depicts a soldier kissing a woman good-bye with an inset photo of Paul Elwood.

The sheet music can be found at the Pritzker Military Museum & Library.

== Bibliography ==
- Parker, Bernard S. (2007). World War I Sheet Music. Vol. 1. Jefferson: McFarland & Company, Inc. ISBN 978-0-7864-2798-7. OCLC 71790113.
- Paas, John Roger, ed. (2014). America Sings of War: American Sheet Music from World War I. Wiesbaden: Harrassowitz Verlag. ISBN 978-3-447-10278-0. OCLC 892462420.
- Vogel, Frederick G. (1995). World War I Songs: A History and Dictionary of Popular American Patriotic Tunes, with Over 300 Complete Lyrics. Jefferson: McFarland & Company, Inc. ISBN 0-89950-952-5. OCLC 32241433.
