= Julia Watson (academic) =

American literary scholar (fl. 2026)

Julia Watson is an American literary scholar focusing on the study of autobiography. She is professor emerita in the Department of Comparative Studies, College of Arts and Sciences, Ohio State University, having retired in 2014.

== Early life and education ==
Watson has a PhD in comparative literature from the University of California, Irvine.

== Career ==
Watson has written extensively on autobiography studies with Sidonie Smith. She is on the editorial board of a/b: Auto/Biography Studies.

== Selected publications ==
- Smith, Sidonie; Watson, Julia (2024). Reading autobiography now: a guide for interpreting life narratives (3rd ed.). Minneapolis: University of Minnesota Press. ISBN 9781517916879. (1st ed: 2001; 1st and 2nd eds had title Reading autobiography without "now")
- Smith, Sidonie; Watson, Julia (2016). Life writing in the long run: a Smith & Watson autobiography studies reader. Ann Arbor: Maize Books. ISBN 9781607854098.
