= Alan Spitzer =

American historian (1925–2024)

- Born: March 27, 1925; Philadelphia, Pennsylvania, United States
- Died: July 23, 2024 (aged 99); Philadelphia, Pennsylvania, United States

Academic background
- Education: Swarthmore College; Columbia University

Academic work
- Discipline: History
- Sub-discipline: Modern French history
- Institutions: Boston University; University of Iowa
- Notable works: The Revolutionary Theories of Louis Auguste Blanqui; Old Hatreds and Young Hopes; The French Generation of 1820; Historical Truth and Lies About the Past

Alan Barrie Spitzer (March 27, 1925 – July 23, 2024) was an American historian who served as a professor emeritus.

He was associated with combining intellectual history with social historical methods, including prosopography and quantitative history, and with methodological work on how generations can be defined and used as an analytical category. His scholarship focused on political and intellectual currents in France during the Bourbon Restoration and nearby decades.

== Early life and education ==
Spitzer was born in Philadelphia on March 27, 1925. He attended Central High School and began college study at Pennsylvania State University before entering military service during World War II. He enlisted in the United States Army in 1943 and was wounded in action in November 1944. Later, he received a Purple Heart. After recovering, he resumed his education at Swarthmore College and completed his undergraduate degree in 1948. His reflections on wartime experience were published in The Palimpsest in 1995.

He undertook graduate study at Columbia University and earned a doctorate in 1955.

== Career ==
After completing his doctorate, Spitzer taught at Boston University for four years before moving to the University of Iowa, where he taught in the history department until retiring from classroom teaching in 1992. At Iowa, he taught modern European history and supervised graduate research, including dissertations. In 1989, he received the University of Iowa Faculty Achievement Award for Excellence in Teaching. He helped create and sustain a seminar based undergraduate course titled Problems in Human History as an alternative to large lecture survey instruction. During the Vietnam War period, he was associated with faculty activism on campus.

Spitzer's early monograph, The Revolutionary Theories of Louis Auguste Blanqui (1957), established him as an interpreter of revolutionary thought and the relationship between political theory and action in nineteenth century France. In Old Hatreds and Young Hopes (1971), he examined the French Carbonari as a conspiratorial and associational phenomenon under the Bourbon Restoration, and the book was reviewed in major journals in history and political science.

His book The French Generation of 1820 (1987) used a bounded cohort approach to analyze intellectual networks, political sensibilities, and career pathways among a group defined by shared formative experiences around the end of empire and the early Restoration. A review in the Journal of Social History discussed the work's use of generation as an organizing concept and its emphasis on networks and associational life. His methodological influence on generational analysis was strongly associated with his 1973 article "The Historical Problem of Generations" in The American Historical Review.

Spitzer also served as president of the Society for French Historical Studies in 1982 and 1983 and held editorial board roles with journals including the Journal of Modern History and French Historical Studies. He held fellowships from organizations including the National Endowment for the Humanities, John Simon Guggenheim Memorial Foundation and the Camargo Foundation in Cassis, France. He was a visiting member of the Institute for Advanced Study in Princeton from September 1979 to June 1980.

After retirement, Spitzer published Historical Truth and Lies About the Past (1996), an essay collection on historical truth, standards of evidence, and public controversies about the past.

== Selected works ==
- The Revolutionary Theories of Louis Auguste Blanqui (1957)
- Old Hatreds and Young Hopes: The French Carbonari against the Bourbon Restoration (1971)
- The French Generation of 1820 (1987).
