= Katharina Rosenberger =

Swiss composer and sound artist

Katharina Rosenberger is a Swiss composer and sound artist. She received the Reid Hall and Camargo Foundation Fellowships for 2006–2007, the 2007 Pro Helvetia composition commission and the 2006 Mediaprojects Award from Projekt Sitemapping of the Swiss Federal Agency. She is particularly known for creating interdisciplinary works that involve elements from concert music, musical theater, sonic art, and sound installation.

Born in Zurich, Rosenberger studied at the Berklee College of Music prior to receiving a Master of Music degree from the Royal Academy of Music and a Doctor of Musical Arts in composition from Columbia University. In 2008, Rosenberger was named assistant professor in Composition at the University of California, San Diego. In 2021, she was appointed professor of composition at the Musikhochschule Lübeck, in 2024, she was named professor of composition at the Haute école de musique de Genève.

Rosenberger's work has been presented in cities around the world including London, Rome, Berlin, Prague and Marseilles. She was a featured artist at the Shanghai New Music Week 2009, the Shanghai International Electro-Acoustic Music Festival, and the October Contemporary in Hong Kong, the Weimarer Frühlingstage, Germany, the Festival Archipel, Switzerland, the NYC Fringe Festival, and the Spark Festival in Minnesota, USA. Previously, she participated in the Festival für Neue Musik, Bamberg, Zürcher Theater Spektakel, Festival La Bâtie – Festival de Genève, Schweizer Tonkünstlerfest Switzerland, Festival Les Musiques, Marseille, Zoo Bizarre Bordeaux, Centre Acanthes at the Avignon Festival, France, Bath International Music Festival, UK, New Media Art Festival, Yerevan, Armenia, International Festival of Modern Arts, Odesa, Ukraine and the Festival "Atélier Třídení plus", Prague, Czech Republic.
