= Domenic Cretara =

American painter (1946–2017)

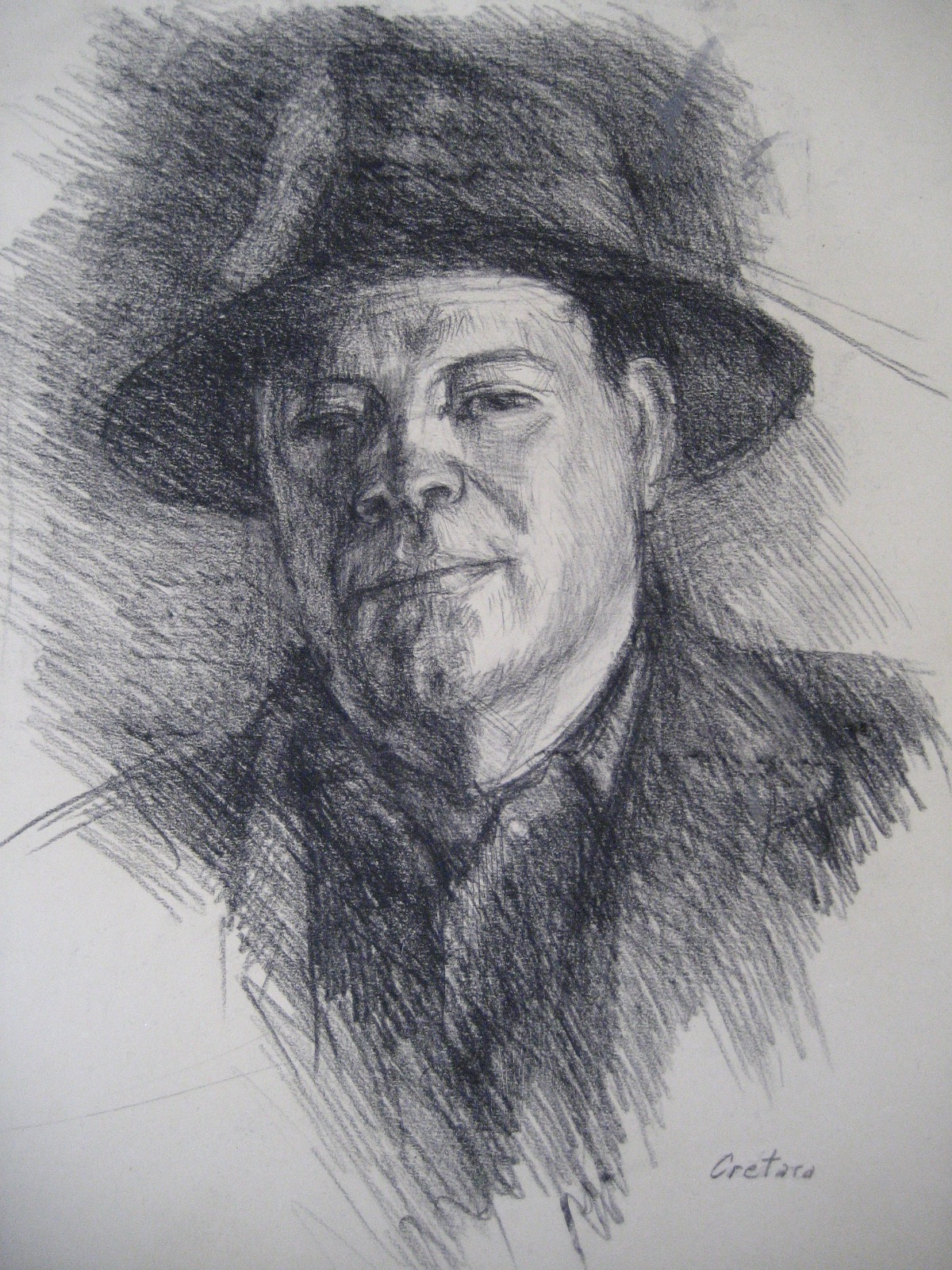
- Study for "Personal Allegory" (Portrait of the artist's father Anthony Mario Cretara)
- Born: Domenic Anthony Giulio Cretara; March 29, 1946; Boston, Massachusetts
- Died: December 22, 2017 (aged 71); Harbor City, California
- Education: Boston University - BFA, MFA
- Known for: Painting, Life Drawing
- Movement: Visionary Realism, Tenebrism, Contemporary art
- Awards: 1974 - Fulbright-Hays Fellowship Program; 2003 - Outstanding Professor Award, California State University-Long Beach

Domenic Anthony Giulio Cretara (March 29, 1946 – December 22, 2017) was an American painter of Italian descent born in Boston, Massachusetts. Cretara is a figurative artist and has often been labeled a modern Caravaggista, as he favors the chiaroscuro method of painting. Domenic died in Harbor City, CA on December 22, 2017.

== Early life ==
=== Childhood ===
Domenic Cretara grew up an only child in an Italian American neighborhood in East Boston, Massachusetts. His father was Anthony Mario Cretara born in Abruzzo, Italy and his mother was Carmela (Addivinola) Cretara born in Boston of Italian immigrant parents from the Campania region of Italy. As an only child, Domenic often retreated into his imagination for subject matter and very often referenced images of the Italian Renaissance artists around his home.

=== Education and training ===
In 1968 Domenic graduated magna cum laude from Boston University, with a bachelor's degree in Fine Arts. He also received his Master of Fine Arts from the same university.

== Career ==
After graduation, Cretara served as Chair of the Fine Arts Department for the Art Institute of Boston, before traveling to California in 1986 to join the studio art department at California State University at Long Beach. While there, he has also acted as the Resident Director for the California State University International Program (CSU IP) in Florence, Italy. As an exhibiting artist in both drawing and painting Cretara's work has been featured in numerous significant figurative exhibitions nationally and internationally since the 1970s. He has had solo exhibitions in New York, Los Angeles, Boston, San Francisco, Seattle, Las Vegas and Minneapolis. During the period from the 1970s to the present his works have been cited in numerous reviews, articles, and publications globally. His influence and impact as both an artist and Professor of Art has contributed to generation upon generation of new art educators and visual artists both in the studio fine arts and in the field of art history in the United States, Europe, and Asia.

=== Exhibitions ===
Cretara's works have been featured in a numerous museum and gallery exhibitions. In 2001 Cretara had a solo exhibition of his work at the Frye Museum in Seattle, Washington titled Dominic Cretara: Portals. In this exhibition he touched on different subjects including the human struggles, a recurring theme in his artwork. In March 2008, the 19-piece collection titled "Domenic Cretara: The Large Drawings" was featured at the Todd Gallery at Middle Tennessee State University. Cretara's work was also included in “The Figure in Contemporary Art” at Cypress College in Cypress California in 2012. The exhibition included other notable figurative artists such as Odd Nerdrum, Ruth Weisberg, Sigmund Abeles, Steven Assael, Juliette Aristides and Jerome Witkin.

In 2013, a retrospective survey of his work was organized by the Triton Museum of Art, Santa Clara, Calif. The featured works were presented in four categories: "Doll Paintings", "Family", "Gender Roles", and "An Italo-American Life". In 2014, he exhibited a series of large scale works on paper in the exhibition "The Way of Flesh Part 2" at Mt. San Antonio College in Walnut, California. An artist discussion panel, led by art critic John Seed, was conducted in connection to the exhibition which included Cretara speaking on the creation of his work and the state of contemporary figurative art. In 2015-16, his work was included in the thematic exhibition "Identity, Who Are We Now" at the Minneapolis Institute of Art. Other notable artists included in the exhibition were Chuck Close, Robert Mapplethorpe, and Kiki Smith.

=== Public Collections ===
- Academy of Motion Picture Arts and Sciences, Los Angeles
- Art Institute of Boston
- Boston Public Library
- Duxbury Museum of Art, Massachusetts
- Macedonian Museum of Contemporary Art, Thessaloniki, Greece
- Metropolitan Museum of Art, New York
- Minneapolis Institute of Art
- Riverside Art Museum, California
- Triton Museum of Art, Santa Clara, Ca.
- University Art Museum, California State University-Long Beach
- University of Delaware, Newark

== Film ==
Domenic Cretara is the subject of a 1997 three-part documentary film titled Painting Circumstantial Evidence by Adam Shanker. Cretara also collaborated, in 2001, on other film projects such as shorts “The Pomegranate,” “The Millstone.” And “The Delirium,” a series of shorts by filmmaker Jose Sanchez – H and poet Tina Datsko. They are based on the book "The Delirium of Simon Bolivar", a poetry book about the South American leader Simon Bolivar, written by Tina Datsko. Domenic, in addition, contributed to the film project with original drawings and paintings.

== Artistic reception ==
In a Summer 2013 review in American Arts Quarterly, Frederick Turner described Cretara as a "leading exponent of an important new movement in American art: Visionary Realism".

=== Accolades ===
Cretara was awarded a Fulbright grant in 1974 in order to fund his activities in Florence, Italy. In 1978 Cretara was awarded a fellowship grant by the Camargo foundation in Cassis, France where he was an artist in residence for a full year. Then in 1984 Cretara was awarded a sister city grant by the city of Padua, Italy where he spent time studying the works by Giotto. In 2003, he was given the Outstanding Professor Award by CSU-Long Beach.

In 2010, his work and writings were included in the book "Portrait Painting Atelier" by Suzanne Brooker.
