= Josette Urso =

American visual artist

- Born: Tampa, Florida, US
- Education: University of South Florida
- Known for: Painting, drawing, collage, mixed-media, textiles
- Spouse: Peter Schroth
- Awards: Pollock-Krasner Foundation; Gottlieb Foundation; National Endowment for the Arts
- Website: Josette Urso

Josette Urso is an American artist based in Brooklyn. Her art includes dense, largely abstract paintings and collages, drawings and paintings of land- and urban-scapes, and mixed-media constructions. She reconfigures fragments of her everyday, immediate environment in shifting, multi-perspectival artworks whose assembled quality has been likened to cubist-influenced art. Her early mixed-material works incorporate primordial, biomorphic references, while her landscape and cityscape works from the 2000s have a loose representational style. In her later, more abstract paintings, Urso piles and juxtaposes marks, visual contrasts, coincidences and allusions, creating unexpected leaps of scale, color and spatial orientation. In 2024, New York Sun critic Mario Naves wrote, "[Urso's] canvases are rich, layered, scrabbled, and encompassing … Each picture is a kaleidoscopic commingling of patterns, textures, diagrammatic notations, and bumptious, cartoony blips. The compositions suggest topographical landscapes put through a technological wringer."

Urso has been recognized by organizations including the Pollock-Krasner Foundation, Adolph and Esther Gottlieb Foundation and National Endowment for the Arts. Her work is held in the collections of the Mint Museum, Leepa-Rattner Museum of Art, Racine Art Museum, Ballinglen Museum of Art, and Ashley Gibson Barnett Museum of Art, among others. She has exhibited at venues including the Bronx Museum of the Arts, The Drawing Center, U.S. Art in Embassies Program, New York Public Library, and Tampa Museum of Art. She teaches at The Cooper Union in New York.

== Life and career ==
Urso was born and grew up in Tampa, Florida; her mother painted and her father, a mathematician, played classical guitar. She graduated from the University of South Florida with a BFA in drawing and an MFA in painting in 1984, having studied with painters including Mernet Larsen and Bruce Marsh; during that period, she also attended the Art Students League of New York. In 1986, Urso relocated to New York. She began teaching at The Cooper Union in 1998, having previously taught at the Chautauqua School of Art from 1985 to 1990, and at other institutions.

Urso has had solo exhibitions at the Fine Arts Museum of Long Island (1987), Museum of Art - DeLand (1993), Tampa Museum of Art (1995), Centro Cultural Costarricense Norteamericano (1997), Museo de Las Americas (Puerto Rico, 2001), Gulf Coast Museum of Art (2006), New York Public Library (2011), Maitland Art Center (2013), and Morean Arts Center (2018). She has had gallery exhibitions at Kathryn Markel Fine Arts (2000–24) and Kenise Barnes (2009–24), among others.

== Work and reception ==
Urso works through an intuitive layering of marks, patterns, materials and imagery that explores the way meaning is constructed through perception and association. Her art (including the abstract work) is observation-based—a direct response to her surroundings: most prominently, the skylines, rooftops and sights of Brooklyn, the busy space of her Bushwick studio, and natural locales around the world. Travel, often made possible by artist residencies, plays a significant role in her work. Her approach is said to focus more on sensation than appearance, capturing in a quick, urgent manner her internal responses to a setting or environment. The original referents in the work—at times visible but often obscure—are sometimes evoked in the titles of individual works or exhibitions.

=== Mixed-media works and collages ===
Josette Urso, Ladybug Ladybug, paper collage and paint, 36" x 36", 2018.

During Urso's first professional decade, critics related her mixed-media constructions and collages to the work of artists Paul Klee, Ree Morton, Sigmar Polke and Jean Tinguely, African art, and the feminist Pattern and Decoration movement. She shared with the latter group tendencies toward irregular formats and edges, decorated frames, and non-traditional materials such as beads, buttons, glitter, wrapping paper, lace, toys and other common objects. Noting the work's blend of the familiar with fantastical, primitive forms (human, animal and vegetative), reviewers described the constructions as quasi-naïve "mind-gardens" that suggested layers of memory and experience and allegories for universal, comic and tragic aspects of life. Phyllis Braff of the New York Times identified a "playful but emphatic disorientation" in the work, which challenged notions of pictorial illusion with its mix of two- and three-dimensional materials, painted and tactile surfaces, and abstract and biomorphic imagery.

After being invited to participate in a quilt show in the early 1990s, Urso made textiles and the patchwork format a significant part of her repertoire. In works like Twin (1996), she incorporated personal, natural and universal imagery into a grid system, bringing to the fore a new impulse to impose order on chaos; she has applied that impulse most prominently in her body of large, circular collages produced since 1998. Consisting of patterns, colors, forms and figures cut from printed or textured sources, their energized surfaces combine random elements with a more organized, meticulous approach to visual space, arranged around concentric, segmented circles; the collages evoke such things as quilts, mandalas and roulette wheels. At a distance, the collages appear largely abstract, but upon closer scrutiny, they offer visual themes and near-narratives exploring connections between humanity, nature and consciousness (e.g., Seventeen, 2005; Ladybug Ladybug, 2018).

Josette Urso, The Glen Off Crossmolina Road, oil on gessoed paper, 15" x 11", 2000. Collection of the Ballingen Museum of Art.

=== Plein air landscapes and drawings ===
In the early 2000s, plein air painting and drawing became integral to Urso's art, signaling a shift away from the large mind-gardens and their overt references. She was first inspired to paint outdoors on trip to Patagonia, Arizona and a residency in Ireland—both in 2000. The small, unrehearsed paintings led her to make dense, varyingly abstract pen and paper works of her natural surroundings during a residency in Ireland in 2002. In subsequent years, she followed with plein air oil works depicting residency locales including Cambodia, Germany and Taiwan and intricate drawings of cityscapes and her studio. Conveying mood and her internal perceptual world as well as a sense of place, these bodies of work have been likened to snapshots from a diary or travel journal.

In the exhibition "One View/Two Visions" (2005), Urso and her husband, Peter Schroth, presented a ten-year body of plein air works painted during joint travels to Ireland, Spain, and in the United States, to Connecticut, Maine and Arizona. Reviewers related the paintings to work by Constable, Turner and Post-Impressionists like Cezanne. Urso's works capture locales in bold, defined brushstrokes, distilling and reconfiguring rocks, water, skies and trees into highly abstract fields of changing color (e.g., The Glen Off Crossmolina Road, 2000); critic Melissa Kuntz termed them "painterly miniature abstractions" whose immediacy and diverse brushwork indicated a painter "responding, almost manically, to a plethora of sensory information."

Josette Urso, Jump City, ink drawing on paper, 10" x 11", 2008.

In the exhibitions "Landscapes/City Scenes" (2006) and "Taking Place" (2012), Urso moved from the lyricism of the landscapes into harder-edged, more realistic urban drawings that depicted skylines through apartment windows, climate, parades, parking garages and industrial buildings from multiple views (e.g., Jump City, 2008). The latter show included a large, site-specific vinyl wall drawing of a packed New York neighborhood and a short video that captured her shoes and the constantly changing sidewalks beneath them during a walk through the city.

=== Oil paintings and watercolors, 2012–present ===
In the 2010s, Urso began to receive wider attention for her improvisational abstract paintings, particularly the large oil works. Her painting style is often noted for its acrobatic mark-making, scaffolding-like shapes, and a mutable quality that critics contend evokes the time between observances of places and things as much as it does physical space and appearance. In a review of Urso's exhibition "Snow Day" (2013), New York Times critic Roberta Smith characterized the work as "a wry, opulent cartography," arising out of the artist's "propensity for weaving, noodling and circling—as well as generally messing wet-on-wet color into subtly crazed patchworks of contrasting patterns, textures and pictorial ideas."

Also commented upon is Urso's balancing of contrasting and colliding elements, spatial relations and references with an overall sense of compositional clarity. The tension between the deliberate and arbitrary underlies a key and longstanding thematic concern in her work—order and focus versus chaos and disarray, which the artist relates to the contemporary experience of information as both essential and potentially overwhelming.

In her shows "On Air" (2018, oil paintings) and "Wildcard" (2024, large oils and small collages and watercolors), Urso presented work, which despite its abstraction, was packed with visual cues from urban vistas, incidents of weather, and her studio. While large canvases such as Corduroy and the Fern and Run With You (both 2024) were typically layered with proliferating shapes, marks and colors, the smaller works were described as calm and intimate, with comparatively subdued palettes (e.g., Snow Glow, 2015). Mario Naves describes Urso's small watercolors as "shimmery and evanescent," while identifying a "grittier, muscular physicality" in the large oil works that he contends offsets the whimsical mingling of disparate elements.

== Recognition and collections ==
Urso has received fellowships and grants from the Gottlieb Foundation (2013), Pollock-Krasner Foundation (2007, 1997), Basil Alkazzi Foundation (2000), Center for Emerging Visual Artists (CFEVA) (1996), National Endowment for the Arts/Mid Atlantic Arts Foundation (1994), Bronx Museum (1988), Chenven Foundation (1988), and Art Matters (1988), among others. She has received artist residencies from organizations including the Atlantic Center for the Arts, Ballinglen Arts Foundation, Camargo Foundation, Loft Nota Bene, Millay Arts, Oberpfälzer Künstlerhaus, Ucross Foundation, Virginia Center for the Creative Arts, and Yaddo.

Her work is held in the public collections of the Ballinglen Museum of Art, Ashley Gibson Barnett Museum of Art, Bronx Museum, Centro Cultural Costarricense Norteamericano, Grand Rapids Public Museum, Leepa-Rattner Museum of Art, Maitland Art Center, Mint Museum, Museum of Art - DeLand, Racine Art Museum, Springfield Museum of Art (Ohio), Stadt Schwandorf, Tampa Museum of Art, University of South Florida Contemporary Art Museum, and U.S. Department of State, among others.
