= Lynn Freed =

South African writer

- Born: 18 July 1945; Durban, South Africa
- Died: 9 May 2025 (aged 79); Sonoma, California, US
- Education: Columbia University (PhD, MA); University of Witwatersrand (BA)
- Occupation: Writer
- Children: Jessica Gamsu
- Writing career
- Notable works: "The Romance of Elsewhere", "The Last Laugh", "The Servants' Quarters", "Reading, Writing and Leaving Home, Life on the Page", "The Curse of the Appropriate Man", "House of Women", "The Mirror", The Bungalow, "Home Ground", "Friends of the Family"
- Website: lynnfreed.com

Lynn Freed (18 July 1945 – 9 May 2025) was a South African-born writer known for her work as a novelist, essayist, and writer of short stories. Freed was awarded the inaugural Katherine Anne Porter Award in fiction by the American Academy of Arts and Letters, as well as numerous other prizes and honors.

Her fellow author Anne Lamott described her as "a beautiful writer, dead-on brilliant, rich in humor, possessing a dark and comforting wisdom."

== Life ==
Lynn Freed was born and grew up in Durban, South Africa. She came to New York City as a graduate student, receiving her M.A. and Ph.D. in English literature from Columbia University.

After moving to San Francisco, she wrote her first novel, Heart Change (republished as Friends of the Family). She published six other novels: Home Ground, The Bungalow, The Mirror, House of Women, The Servants' Quarters and The Last Laugh. She additionally published a collection of short stories, The Curse of the Appropriate Man and two collections of essays: Reading, Writing & Leaving Home: Life on the Page and The Romance of Elsewhere.

Freed's short fiction and essays appeared in Harper's, The New Yorker, The Atlantic Monthly, Narrative Magazine, Ploughshares, Southwest Review, Michigan Quarterly Review, The Santa Monica Review, The New York Times, The Washington Post, The Wall Street Journal, Newsday, Mirabella, Elle, House Beautiful, House & Garden, Travel & Leisure and Vogue, among others. Her work is widely translated, and is included in a number of anthologies.

In 2011, Freed won an O. Henry Award for her short story, "Sunshine" (included in The O. Henry Prize Stories 2011), and, in 2015, another for “The Way Things Are Going” (included in The O. Henry Prize Stories, 2015). In 2012, her essay, "Keeping Watch", was included in Best American Travel Writing. She won the Bay Area Book Reviewers' Award for Fiction (Home Ground), and subsequently had four books nominated for the same award. Most of her books appeared on The New York Times "Notable Books of the Year" list as well as on its "New & Noteworthy Paperback" list, as well as on the lists of The Washington Post, the Times Literary Supplement and other journals.

In 2002, Freed was awarded the inaugural Katherine Anne Porter Award in fiction by the American Academy of Arts and Letters. She has received grants and fellowships from the National Endowment for the Arts and the Guggenheim Foundation, and been awarded residencies and fellowships supported by the Rockefeller Foundation, the Camargo Foundation, the Lannan Foundation, the John D. and Catherine T. MacArthur Foundation, the Bogliasco Foundation, Civitella Ranieri, the Corporation of Yaddo, and the MacDowell Colony, among others.

Freed was a professor of english at the University of California, Davis (UC Davis).

Freed died of lymphoma at her home in Sonoma, California, on 9 May 2025.

== Awards ==
In 2002, Lynn Freed received the inaugural Katherine Anne Porter Award for Fiction from the American Academy of Arts and Letters. She has also received fellowships, grants and support from the National Endowment for the Arts, The Guggenheim Foundation, The Camargo Foundation, The Rockefeller Foundation, and the Lannan Foundation, and the Bogliasco Foundation. In 1986, she won the Bay Area Book Reviewers' Award for Fiction, and her short fiction has been recommended in "Best American Short Stories" and the "O'Henry Awards: Prize Stories". In 2011 she won the PEN/O. Henry Prize for her short story "Sunshine," originally published in Narrative Magazine, and, in 2015 she won the PEN/O. Henry Prize for her short story, "The Way Things Are Going", originally published in Harper's Magazine.

== Works ==
- "The Romance of Elsewhere" (2017)
- "The Last Laugh" (2017)
- "The Servants' Quarters" (2009)
- "Reading, Writing & Leaving Home: Life on the Page" (2005)
- "The Curse of the Appropriate Man, Stories" (2004)
- "House of Women" (2002)
- "The Mirror" (1997)
- The Bungalow (1993)
- Home Ground (1986)
- Friends of the Family (first published as Heart Change, 1982)
