= Helmut Norpoth =

American political scientist (born 1943)

- Born: 1943 (age 82–83); Essen, Nazi Germany
- Education: University of Michigan
- Known for: Predicting election results
- Scientific career
- Fields: Political science
- Workplaces: Stony Brook University
- Thesis: Sources of party cohesion in the U.S. House of Representatives (1974)

Helmut Norpoth (born 1943) is an American political scientist and professor of political science at Stony Brook University. Norpoth is best known for developing the Primary Model to predict United States presidential elections. Norpoth's model has successfully matched the results of 25 out of 29 United States presidential elections since 1912, with the exceptions being those in 1960, 2000, 2020, and 2024.

== Early life, education, and career ==
Norpoth was born in Essen, Germany, in 1943. He received his undergraduate degree from the Free University of Berlin in West Berlin in 1966. He then attended the University of Michigan, where he received his M.A. and Ph.D. in 1967 and 1974, respectively. Before joining Stony Brook University as an assistant professor in 1979, he taught at the University of Arizona (he had been a visiting lecturer in its political science department in 1978), the University of Cologne, and the University of Texas at Austin. In 1980, Norpoth was promoted to associate professor at Stony Brook University and became a tenured full professor there in 1985.

== Research ==
Norpoth's research focuses on multiple subjects in political science, including public opinion and electoral behavior, and predicting the results of elections in the United States, Great Britain, and Germany. Alongside fellow political scientist Michael Lewis-Beck, he is the co-author of The American Voter Revisited, a 2008 book published by the University of Michigan Press the covering the images of presidential candidates, party identification, and why Americans turn out to vote. He also wrote Confidence Regained: Economics, Mrs. Thatcher, and the British Voter, a 1992 book published by the University of Michigan Press about public reactions to Margaret Thatcher, especially her economic and foreign policies. Other articles written by Norpoth include "Fighting to Win: Wartime Morale in the American Public" with Andrew H. Sidman (2012), "Yes, Prime Minister: The Key to Forecasting British Elections" with Matthew Lebo (2011), "The New Deal Realignment in Real Time" with Andrew H. Sidman and Clara Suong, "History and Primary: The Obama Re-Election" with Michael Bednarczuk, and "Guns 'N Jobs: The FDR Legacy" with Alexa Bankert.

== Election model ==
Norpoth developed the Primary Model, a statistical model of United States presidential elections based on data going back to 1912. Instead of opinion polling, Norpoth relies on statistics from a candidate's performance in the primaries and patterns in the electoral cycle to forecast results through the Primary Model. The Primary Model is based on two factors: whether the party that has been in power for a long time seems to be about to lose it, and whether a given candidate did better in the primaries than his or her opponent. The Primary Model was first used in the 1996 election, and correctly predicted Barack Obama's re-election as early as February 2012 and the election of Donald Trump in 2016.

Norpoth's election model had predicted 25 out of the past 29 elections, with 1960, 2000, 2020, and 2024 as misses.

=== Recent misses ===
==== 2016 ====
In February 2015, Norpoth projected that Republicans had a 65 percent chance of winning the presidential election the following year. In February 2016, he had predicted a Trump victory with 97 percent certainty, and by October 2016, citing Trump's performance in the primaries, his election model projected a win for Trump with a certainty of 87 to 99 percent, in contrast to all major election forecast. As a result, Norpoth's election model gained significant media attention because it predicted that Trump would win the election. Despite the attention for predicting Trump would win in 2016, Norpoth's election model only said that Trump would win the two-party popular vote 52.5% to 47.5%; Trump actually lost the 2016 two-party popular vote 48.2% to 46.1%, and the Primary Model for the next elections was modified to predict only the Electoral College votes as a result. In response to critics who cited polls in which Hillary Clinton led Trump by a significant margin, Norpoth said that these polls were not taking into account who will actually vote in November 2016, writing that "nearly all of us say, oh yes, I'll vote, and then many will not follow through."

==== 2020 ====
On March 2, 2020, Norpoth stated that his model gave Trump a 91 percent chance at winning re-election. His model also predicted that Trump would win with up to 362 electoral votes. This would have required Trump to have flipped several Clinton states from 2016; however, this prediction proved to be inaccurate. Trump did not flip any states Clinton won in 2016 and ended up losing five states plus one electoral vote in Nebraska that he won in 2016, ultimately losing the election with 232 electoral votes to Biden's 306 electoral votes. Norpoth cited a "perfect storm" of subsequent surprise events following his prediction that were not taken into account, notably the COVID-19 pandemic in the United States, which led to lockdowns, beginning only a few weeks after his prediction, and an economic downturn, which was not improved due to perceived inadequate response by Trump. The pandemic also led to an increase in mail-in and absentee ballots, which would lean toward the Democratic candidate. The George Floyd protests were also cited as a factor.

==== 2024 ====
The Primary Model for 2024 predicted a victory for Kamala Harris at 75 percent. Before the withdrawal of Joe Biden from the presidential election, the Primary Model had also given Biden a 75 percent chance to defeat Trump; this was because Biden was the incumbent and had won the Democratic primaries in New Hampshire and South Carolina by larger margins than Trump had in the Republican primaries. Norpoth thus predicted an election win for Biden based on the similar positive results for Trump in the 2020 Republican primaries (and which the Primary Model had incorrectly predicted would lead to a Trump victory). Biden would therefore secure 315 electoral votes and Trump 223 electoral votes. Harris ultimately lost to Trump, winning only 226 electoral votes to Trump's 312 electoral votes.
