= Jeanne C. Finley =

American artist

- Born: November 2, 1955 (age 70)

Jeanne C. Finley (born November 2, 1955) is an American artist who works with representational media including film, photography, and video. Her projects take a variety of forms including site-specific projections, sculptural installations, drawing, experimental non-fiction films, and engaged participatory events. She is a member of the San Francisco Threshold Choir and frequently incorporates the choir and original songs into her work. She has collaborated with artist and educator John Muse on numerous films and installations since 1989.

== Work ==
Finley frequently begins her projects by engaging in a series of non-fiction strategies of research which include interviews, site visits, and chronicling archival, original film, and photographic sources. She layers these bodies of research with humor, imagined narratives, and empirical information from the sciences, a tactic which highlights the contestable authority of the documentarian voice. Finley's process is often collaborative and she works with other artists as well as the individuals represented in her projects to create work.

Finley's early work with projected photographic slide shows such as Deaf Dog Can Hear, 1984, has developed into the continued creation of multi projector site-specific installation pieces including The Adventures of Blacky, 1999, The Trial of Harmony and Invention, Winter, 2001, Catapult, 2005, Sleeping Under Stars, Living Under Satellites], 2010, and the outdoor projection version of Book Report, 2017, for the True/False Film Festival.

Many of Finley’s projects explore sites where the lives of individuals have shifted due to events outside of their control. The tension between individual will and social/political structures is explored in works such as Manhole 452, 2011, a film in which a man ruminates on fate and determination after a manhole cover explodes under his car on Geary Street. The Napoleon Room, 2008, shown at the Camargo Foundation in Southern France, uses sound as well as interior and exterior projections on a room where Napoleon slept. This piece intertwines different narratives of war, including Finley’s mother’s experience at the site when she participated in the invasion of Southern France during World War II.

Finley often works with essay-formatted narratives, such as in the work Fat Chance, 2014. In this film, Finley combines footage of a wrecked sailboat with an original sound score developed and voiced by media artist Pamela Z. The film tells of the rogue wave that hit the sailboat, and includes an interview from one of the fathers piloting the boat before the accident. He testifies to the power of the documentary footage, which helped him move away from guilt, and towards the acceptance of the death of his friend’s son, an incident beyond his control.

The use of language as a weapon or tool of resistance has been a focus of a number of Finley's films, as seen in Involuntary Conversion, 1991, Language Lessons, 2002, and Book Report, 2017.

Several projects, such as Journeys Beyond the Cosmodrome, 2017, Falsework, 2015, and Threshold, 2012, use public and participatory singing to harness the fissures between the physicality of Finley's subjects and their often disembodied voices, a result of her often utilized format of the voice-over. The multi-platform project Journeys Beyond the Cosmodrome, 2017, began as a workshop with sixteen teenagers graduating out of an orphanage in Kazakhstan during which they imagined their lives after graduating through writing, photography, and video. In 2018, during a live cinema presentation of this project, the San Francisco Threshold choir performed music that singer/composer Kri Schlafer had written based on the language from the teenagers' stories.

== Biography ==
Finley was born in 1962 in Roanoke, Virginia. After graduating with an master's degree in photography at the University of Arizona in Tucson, where she also worked as the Curator for the Center for Contemporary Photography, Finley returned to San Francisco, her home base since the early 1980s. She worked as the Assistant Director for San Francisco Camerawork before accepting a teaching position at the San Francisco Art Institute. She curated exhibitions in her role as a board member in experimental exhibitions spaces such as New Langton Arts and San Francisco Cinematheque, and made work inspired by discourse with fellow artists such as Mark Durant, Lynne Sachs, Larry Sultan, Doug Hall, Lynn Hershman and Nayland Blake. In 1989 she received a Fulbright Fellowship to Belgrade, Yugoslavia where she worked at TV Belgrade with Dunja Blazevic, producing hour-long documentaries and original art programs for TV Galleria, a monthly, nationally broadcast program on the arts. She has produced and directed films and installations while working abroad in Istanbul, Moscow, Cassis France, Sarajevo and Kazakhstan as well as throughout the United States. Finley’s work has been exhibited internationally, including the Guggenheim Museum, San Francisco Museum of Modern Art, and New York Museum of Modern Art, Whitney Museum, and the George Pompidou Center. She has served on the board of directors of the Djerassi Foundation for seven years and is a Professor of Film and Graduate Fine Art at The California College of the Arts.

== Awards ==
Finley has received a number of grants and fellowships, including a Fulbright Fellowship to Belgrade, where she directed Nomads at the 25 Door a work which explores the displacement of individuals from their homes. In 1994 she lived in Istanbul through a Lila Wallace Reader’s Digest Fellowship where she directed Conversations Across the Bosphorus, an experimental documentary about two women’s relationship to their faith. During her Guggenheim Fellowship, Finley co-directed Arm Around Moscow with Gretchen Stoeltje, a feature documentary about an American Russian matchmaking service. A CEC Artslink Fellowship brought Finley to Kazakhstan, where she spent two summers working with 16-year-olds aging out of the Akkol orphanage. Other awards include a Rockefeller Media Arts Fellowship, Creative Capital, Cal Arts / Alpert Award, National Endowment for the Arts Fellowships, NYSCA Award and the Phelan Award. Her films have been honored by awards at festivals including the San Francisco International Film Festival, Atlanta Film Festival, Berlin Video Festival, Toronto Film Festival, and World Wide Video Festival.
