= David T. Hanson =

American photographer (born 1948)

- Born: David Taverner Hanson; January 28, 1948 (age 78); Billings, Montana, U.S.
- Education: Rhode Island School of Design, Stanford University
- Known for: Photography, mixed-media, installations
- Awards: John Simon Guggenheim Memorial Foundation Fellowship
- Website: www.davidthanson.org

David Taverner Hanson (born January 28, 1948) is an American environmental photographer known for his striking images documenting the impact of human activities on the natural world. His large-format and aerial photographs, mixed-media works, and installations have focused on industrial and military sites. His work has been described as beautiful even though it shows the ravages of activities such as mining, toxic waste sites, industrial pollution, and deforestation. He has exhibited his photographs in many major museums such as the Museum of Modern Art in New York City, and his exhibitions have been widely reviewed.

== Early life and education ==
Hanson was born on January 28, 1948, in Billings, Montana. He earned a BA in English from Stanford University in 1970 and a Master of Fine Arts in photography from Rhode Island School of Design in 1983. He was an adjunct professor at Rhode Island School of Design from 1983 to 2000.

== Career ==
Hanson began to photograph as an undergraduate at Stanford, but he made a serious commitment to art when he took a nine-month private workshop from American photographer Minor White in 1973. He served on the art faculty at Phillips Academy in Andover, Massachusetts from 1975 to 78. After spending a year photographing in France and Italy on a Camargo Foundation Fellowship, he worked as an assistant to Frederick Sommer.

Initially he focused on naturalistic photographs of the landscape in the tradition of photographers such as Ansel Adams. But in 1982, while on leave from his graduate program, he had an artistic crisis: he realized that nature was changing, that it was being assaulted by industry. While driving to his parents' house in Billings, he came across Colstrip, Montana, a mining town in an area where the landscape had been ruined. He made that his subject, taking wide-angle and aerial photographs.

His photographs of the coal strip mine, power plant, and factory town in Colstrip were subsequently exhibited at the Museum of Modern Art in New York in 1984 and 1986, bringing widespread attention to his work.

Since the late 1980s Hanson has worked with regional and national environmental organizations and legislators on mining reform, hazardous waste issues, and energy production and climate change.

A mid-career survey of his work was published in 1997 by Aperture as Waste Land: Meditations on a Ravaged Landscape. The sociologist Andrew Ross wrote, "Hanson's Waste Land series is a stunning documentary of a century of organized state terrorism against the North American land, its species, and its peoples."

In 2016 Hanson published a retrospective volume of his work from 1982 to 1990, Wilderness to Wasteland, that was reviewed by Joyce Carol Oates in The New Yorker and covered by Newsweek, The Guardian, and other major media.

Hanson's mixed-media installations have addressed North Carolina industries and endangered species, the Dugway Proving Ground in Utah, and U.S. nuclear tests.

The art historian Suzi Gablik said of his artwork, "The history of Western industrial society's assault on the earth and the devastation it has wrought are the subjects of Hanson's aerial photographs. The images are harsh, distressing and terrible. . . . Hanson’s photographs of this ongoing drama are among the most powerful and disturbing images ever to be seen, perhaps because their eerie, abstract beauty almost seems to negate the sinister, hidden life which glimmers in them: landscape as Eros transformed into landscape as Thanatos."

== Awards and major exhibitions ==
Hanson has received a number of awards for his work, including a John Simon Guggenheim Memorial Foundation Fellowship in 1985 and National Endowment for the Arts Visual Artist's Fellowships in 1986 and 1994. His artwork has been featured in numerous museum exhibitions, including the Museum of Modern Art in New York, the Whitney Museum of American Art, the Art Institute of Chicago, the San Francisco Museum of Modern Art, Aperture Foundation Burden Gallery, National Museum of American Art, Southeastern Center for Contemporary Art, International Center of Photography, and Harvard Art Museums.

== Monographs ==
- Waste Land: Meditations on a Ravaged Landscape, texts by David T. Hanson, Wendell Berry, Mark Dowie, Susan Griffin, William Kittredge, Terry Tempest Williams, and Peter Montague & Maria B. Pellerano (Aperture, New York, 1997). ISBN 978-0-89381-726-8
- Colstrip, Montana, texts by David T. Hanson and Rick Bass (Taverner Press, Fairfield, Iowa, 2010). ISBN 978-1-935202-20-2
- Wilderness to Wasteland, texts by David T. Hanson, Joyce Carol Oates, and Miles Orvell (Taverner Press, Fairfield, Iowa, 2016). ISBN 978-0-692-49372-4
- Waste Land, texts by David T. Hanson, Jimena Canales, and Wendell Berry (Taverner Press, Fairfield, Iowa, 2018). ISBN 978-0-692-04607-4
- The Cloud of Unknowing, texts by David T. Hanson, Diana L. Eck, and Mark Holborn (Taverner Press, Fairfield, Iowa, 2019). ISBN 978-0-692-09670-3
