= Miriam Beerman =

American painter and printmaker (1923–2022)

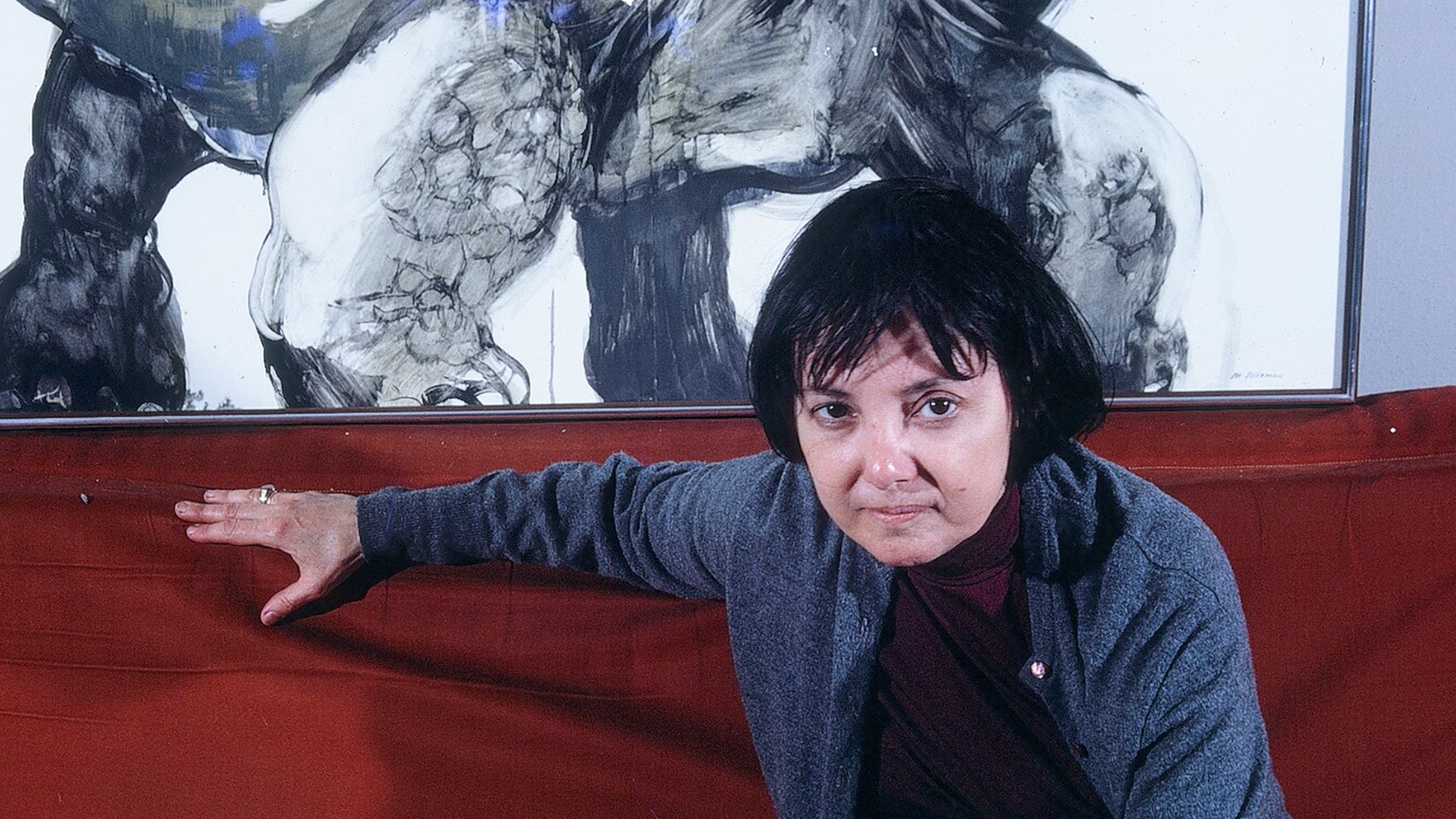
Miriam Beerman in Expressing Chaos

Miriam Beerman (November 15, 1923 – February 2022) was an American abstract expressionist painter and printmaker. She was born in Providence, Rhode Island, on November 15, 1923, and died in February 2022, at the age of 98.

== Education ==
Miriam Beerman earned her BFA from the Rhode Island School for Design, where she studied painting under John Frazier. After earning her degree, she studied with various established artists including Yasuo Kuniyoshi at the Art Students League in NYC, Adja Yunkers at the New School for Social Research in New York City, and Stanley William Hayter at Atelier 17 in Paris, France.

== Career ==
Self-portrait (1950), National Portrait Gallery, Washington, D.C.

Beerman maintained the gestural brushstrokes of abstract expressionism and often centered her pieces on human or animal forms. Her work includes automatic gestures, vivid colors, and stippled textures. In an artist's statement, she explained that her work is a response to her perception of a sense of brutality, devastation, and chaos in the world around her. She drew specific inspiration from biblical plagues, The Holocaust, and the Atomic bombing of Hiroshima and Nagasaki.

She was the first woman to ever have a solo exhibition at the Brooklyn Museum and has since had 31 solo exhibitions of her work. Her work has been exhibited globally, including at the Corcoran Gallery of Art in Washington, DC, the Whitney Museum of American Art in New York, NY, the Montclair Art Museum in Montclair, New Jersey, and the National Gallery of Art in Washington, DC.

In 2000, Beerman was an Artist's Book Resident at the Women's Studio Workshop in Rosendale, New York. During her residency, Beerman published Faces, a limited-edition portfolio of eight drypoint prints with text from The Notebooks of Malte Laurids Brigge by Rainer Maria Rilke.

Miriam Beerman: Expressing the Chaos (2015) is a documentary film directed by Jonathan Gruber, which explores her artwork. The film was shown on PBS and on Dutch and New Zealand T.V.

After she died in 2022, the retrospective exhibition, Miriam Beerman: 1923–2022 Nothing has changed, was held at the Rechnitz Hall DiMattio Gallery in West Long Branch and included twenty large-scale paintings by the late artist.

Beerman's work is included in the collections of the National Gallery of Art, the National Portrait Gallery, the Metropolitan Museum of Art, the Los Angeles County Museum of Art, the Brooklyn Museum, the National Museum of Women in the Arts, the Phillips Collection, the Victoria & Albert Museum, and the Whitney, along with dozens of other museums.

== Awards ==
Beerman received numerous grants and awards throughout her career. These include a CAPS grant from New York State Council on the Arts (1971), the Childe Hassam Purchase Award from the American Academy of Arts and Letters (1977), the Camargo Foundation Award (1980), a distinguished artist grant from the New Jersey State Council on the Arts (1987), and a 40-year retrospective of her work, held at the State Museum of New Jersey in Trenton (1991).

Beerman received awards and honors from the Pollock Krasner Foundation and Joan Mitchell Foundation among others. She also received an alumni award from the Rhode Island School of Design in 2015.

In 2015, she had a collage retrospective at Lawrence University.
