= Richard Gordon Lillard =

Author, educator, environmentalist (1909–1990)

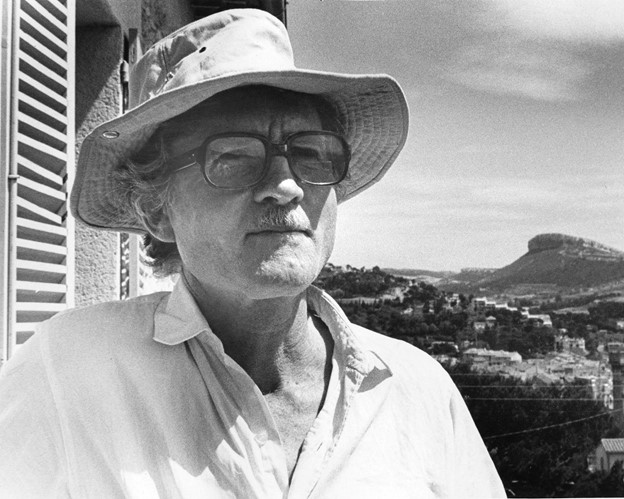
- Lillard at the Camargo Foundation in 1977
- Born: June 3, 1909; Los Angeles, California
- Died: March 19, 1990 (aged 80)
- Occupations: Author, educator

Richard Gordon Lillard (June 3, 1909 – March 19, 1990) was an American author and educator. He was an early contributor to the environmental movement in Southern California. The Richard G. Lillard Outdoor Classroom, along the Los Angeles River, is named after him.

== Early life ==
Lillard was born in Los Angeles, California. He grew up in Sacramento, California. After graduating from Sacramento High School in 1926. Lillard received a BA in English at Stanford University (1930), an MA in English at the University of Montana (1931), and a PhD in American Civilization at the University of Iowa in 1943. He did graduate study in American history and American literature at Harvard University (1934–1935).

== Career as an educator ==
Lillard was a professor at Los Angeles City College from 1933 to 1934, 1935 to 1942, and 1949 to 1965 and at California State University, Los Angeles from 1965 to 1976 where he was chair of the Department of English from 1971 to 1974. He taught courses in creative writing, and specialized in Mark Twain, Herman Melville, and Emily Dickinson.

== Publications and environmental activism ==
Lillard wrote on topics related to his early interest in American Civilization and his later espousal of what became known as the environmental movement. In addition to hundreds of articles and book reviews from 1932 to 1986, he wrote six books, created several bibliographies, and edited some early Californian correspondence. His book, Eden in Jeopardy: Man's Prodigal Meddling with his Environment, the Southern California Experience was an early cry for environmental consciousness. From 1972 to 1980, he continued his environmental pursuits through his bi-monthly column entitled "About Nature" for Westways Magazine, a publication of the Automobile Club of Southern California. In that column he "exposed Westways readers to the growing influence of environmentalism and charmed them with lovely descriptions of Southern California’s natural environs and the animal and plant species that [he] encountered in his travels."

== Published books ==
- Coan, Otis W.; Lillard, Richard Gordon (1941). America in Fiction. Stanford, California: Stanford University Press.
- Lillard, Richard Gordon (1942). Desert Challenge: An Interpretation of Nevada. New York City: Alfred A. Knopf.
- Lillard, Richard Gordon (1947). The Great Forest. New York City: Alfred A. Knopf.
- Lillard, Richard Gordon (1956). American Life in Autobiography. Stanford, California: Stanford University Press.
- Lillard, Richard Gordon (1966). Eden in Jeopardy: Man's Prodigal Meddling with the Environment – the Southern California Experience. New York City: Alfred A. Knopf.
- Bakker, Elna; Lillard, Richard Gordon (1972). The Great Southwest. Palo Alto, California: American West Publishing.
- Lillard, Richard Gordon; Hood, Mary (1973). Hank and Horace: An Enduring Episode in Western History. Georgetown (Washington, D.C.): Wilmac Press.
- Lillard, Richard Gordon (1978). A Bridge over Troubled Waters: A Report on Four All-Day Meetings. Los Angeles, California: Victor Gruen Center for Environmental Planning.
- Lillard, Richard Gordon (1983). My Urban Wilderness in the Hollywood Hills: A Year of Years on Quito Lane. Lanham, Maryland: University Press of America.
- Powell, G. Harold (1990). Lillard, Richard Gordon (ed.). Letters from the Orange Empire. Los Angeles, California: [Los Angeles Historical Society of Southern California.

== Honors and awards ==
Lillard was given the Outstanding Professor Award by California State University, Los Angeles, in 1968. He received the Fellows Award from the Historical Society of Southern California in 1989. He received a Guggenheim Fellowship for American Literature in 1945. He was a Fulbright Lecturer in English, in 1957–1958, at the University of Grenoble and the University of Aix-Marseilles. He received a fellowship from the Huntington Library in San Marino, California. His book, American Life in Autobiography won listing in the White House Library.

Lillard's working papers are available at the UCLA Library.
