= Cognitive Madisonianism =

Cognitive Madisonianism is the idea that divided government is better than one in which a single party controls both the executive and legislative branches. A relatively large percentage of the populace of the United States [over 20%] supposedly voted a split ticket because of this belief between 1992 and 1996, according to "Split-Ticket Voting: The Effects of Cognitive Madisonianism" by Lewis-Beck and Nadeau.

In the US, Cognitive Madisonianism is in keeping with Article One of the United States Constitution, and the principle of separation of powers under the United States Constitution. It comes about from the belief that James Madison, and the other Founding Fathers of the United States, intended power within the institutions of government (executive, legislature and judiciary) to be separate and act as checks and balances against each other. Voters might vote in this way because they do not want any of the above institutions to exercise too much power individually, as this might lead to tyranny. Voting due to Cognitive Madisonianism has the potential to create a weak government and negatively impact the administration of the country, because it creates split ticket voting, which in turn can create legislative gridlock.
