= Bonnie Effros =

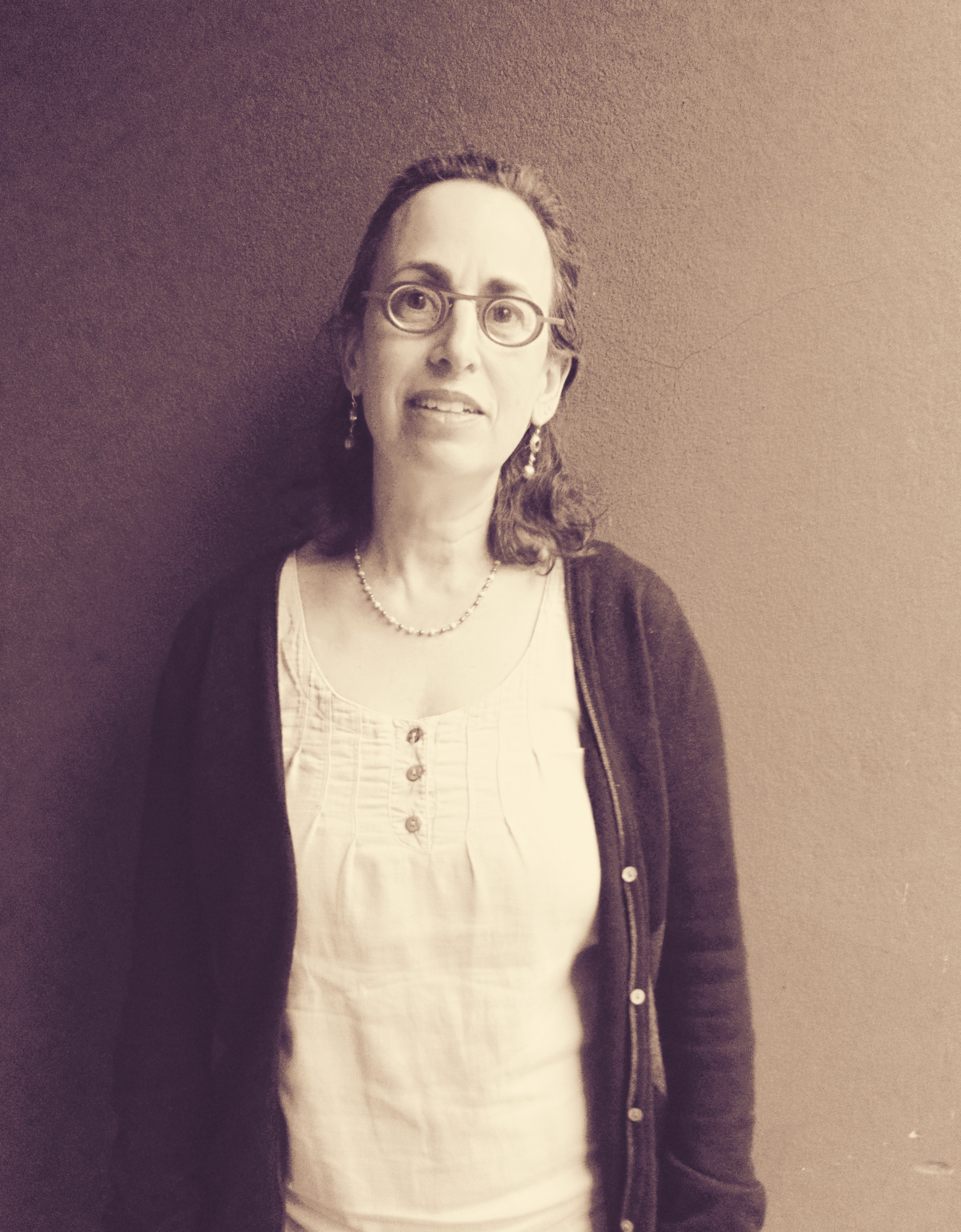
Bonnie Effros

Bonnie Effros FRHistS is Professor and Head of History at the University of British Columbia. She previously held the post of Chaddock Chair of Economic and Social History at the University of Liverpool. She is and a Fellow of the Royal Historical Society. She is an expert on the history of France in the nineteenth century, and late antique and early medieval history and archaeology, history of archaeology, and gender history and archaeology.

== Education ==
Effros studied at Somerville College, Oxford and received her BA from Brandeis University in 1987 and her MA from University California, Los Angeles in 1990. She received her PhD from University of California, Los Angeles in 1994. Her doctoral thesis was entitled From Grave Goods to Christian Epitaphs: Evolution in Burial Tradition and the Expression of Social Status in Merovingian Society.

== Career ==
Effros held the Izaak Walton Killam Memorial Postdoctoral Fellowship 1994-5 at the University of Alberta. She was Assistant and Associate Professor in the Department of Historical Studies, 1996-2001, at Southern Illinois University. She was Associate Professor and then Professor in the Department of History at Binghamton University 2001-09, and Chair of Department 2004-06. Effros joined the Department of History at the University of Florida in 2009 as Professor of History and she was the inaugural Robert and Margaret Rothman Chair and Director of the Center for the Humanities and the Public Sphere.

Effros was appointed Professor of European History in the School of Histories, Languages, and Cultures at the University of Liverpool in August 2017. She was named the Chaddock Chair in Economic and Social History in October 2017. She left the University of Liverpool in and joined the University of British Columbia in 2022.

Effros was a Fellow of the School of Historical Studies at the Institute for Advanced Study, University of Princeton, 2013-14. Her project was History of Archaeology. From 2004 she has edited Brill's Series on the Early Middle Ages. From 2016 she has been a member of the editorial board of the journal Studies in Late Antiquity.

In 2019 she joined the Guild of Students’ ‘Fossil Free’ campaign, calling on the University of Liverpool to end their investment in fossil fuel companies.

== Bibliography ==
- Caring for Body and Soul: Burial and the Afterlife in the Merovingian World (Penn State University Press, 2002)
- Creating Community with Food and Drink in Merovingian Gaul (London: Palgrave, 2002)
- Merovingian Mortuary Archaeology and the Making of the Early Middle Ages (University of California Press 2003)
- Uncovering the Germanic Past: Merovingian Archaeology in France, 1830-1914 (Oxford: Oxford University Press, 2012)
- Incidental Archaeologists: French Officers and the Rediscovery of Roman North Africa (Ithaca: Cornell University Press, 2018)
- (co-edited with Guolong Lai) Unmasking Ideology in Imperial and Colonial Archaeology: Vocabulary, Symbols and Legacy (Los Angeles: Cotsen Institute of Archaeology Press, 2018)
