= Dudley Andrew =

American film theorist

- Born: July 28, 1947 (age 79)

Academic background
- Education: University of Notre Dame (BA); Columbia University (MFA); University of Iowa (PhD)

James Dudley Andrew (born July 28, 1945) is an American film theorist, particularly specializing in world cinema, aesthetics, and French cinema. He is R. Selden Rose Professor Emeritus of Film and Comparative Literature at Yale University, where he has taught since the year 2000.

== Education ==
Andrew earned a BA from the University of Notre Dame in 1967, an MFA from Columbia University in 1969, and a Ph.D from the University of Iowa in 1972. He studied English and philosophy before learning filmmaking.

== Career ==
Before moving to Yale University, Andrew taught for thirty years at the University of Iowa. Andrew's works have been widely translated, including into French, Spanish, Portuguese, Chinese, Korean, Arabic, Persian, Turkish, Serbo-Croatian, and Polish.

== Awards and distinctions ==
Andrew has been awarded a Guggenheim Fellowship and was named a Commandeur in the Ordre des Arts et des Lettres by the French Ministry of Culture, its highest distinction. In 2006, he was elected a Fellow of the American Academy of Arts and Sciences. In 2011, he received the Society for Cinema and Media Studies Distinguished Career Achievement Award.

Andrew is known for his theory that there are three modes of adaptation in film. These are borrowing, meaning re-creating the feeling of the original, which is used just for inspiration; the use of unaltered fragments; and "fidelity and transformation", adapting the whole text and its meaning.

== Selected publications ==
Written

- The Major Film Theories. Oxford, New York: Oxford University Press, 1976.
- André Bazin. New York: Oxford University Press, 1978. ISBN 0-19-502165-7
- Kenji Mizoguchi: A Guide to References and Resources with Paul Andrew. G.K. Hall & Co., 1981.
- Concepts in Film Theory. Oxford, New York: Oxford University Press, 1984.
- Film in the Aura of Art. Princeton: Princeton University Press, 1986
- Breathless: Jean-Luc Godard, Director. (Rutgers Films in Print series). Rutgers University Press, 1988.
- Mists of Regret: Culture and Sensibility in Classic French Film. Princeton: Princeton University Press, 1995. ISBN 0-691-00883-3
- Popular Front Paris and the Poetics of Culture with Steven Ungar. Cambridge: Harvard University Press, 2005.
- What Cinema Is! Wiley-Blackwell, 2010
- French Cinema: A Very Short Introduction. Oxford University Press, 2023

Edited

- The Image in Dispute: Art and Cinema in the Age of Photography. Austin: University of Texas Press, 1997.
- Sanshô Dayû (Sansho the Bailiff) with Carole Cavanaugh. (BFI Film Classics). British Film Institute, 2000. ISBN 0-85170-541-3
- Opening Bazin: Postwar Film Theory and Its Afterlife. Oxford University Press, 2011
- with Anne Gillain. A Companion to François Truffaut. Wiley-Blackwell, 2013
- (and translated) André Bazin's New Media. University of California Press, 2014
- André Bazin on Adaptation: Cinema's Literary Imagination. University of California Press, 2022
