= Rudolph Binion =

American historian (1927–2011)

- Born: 1927; New York City, New York
- Died: 2011 (aged 83–84); Brookline, Massachusetts
- Occupations: Historian, author
- Spouse: Elena Lagrange

Academic background
- Education: Columbia University

Academic work
- Discipline: History
- Institutions: Brandeis University

Rudolph Binion (1927–2011) was an American historian and author who taught at Brandeis University.

== Early life and education ==
Binion was born in New York City in 1927 to an Austro-Hungarian father and an American mother; he had at least one sibling, a sister.

He received a Doctor of Philosophy degree in history from Columbia University in 1958.

== Career ==
Binion began his career history teaching at Rutgers University (1955–56), Massachusetts Institute of Technology (1956–59), and Columbia University (1963–67), as well as serving in the United States Army. In 1967, he joined the faculty at Brandeis University, where he eventually served as the Leff Family Professor of Modern European History. Aside from spending a year at Collège de France as a visiting scholar, Binion remained at Brandeis until his retirement.

== Awards and honours ==
Binion received the AHA Prize in European International History in 1960 for his work Defeated Leaders: The Political Fate of Cailleux, Jouvenel, and Tardieu.

== Personal life ==
He was married to Elena Lagrange.

He died at his home in Brookline, Massachusetts in May 2011, following a long illness.

== Publications ==
- Defeated Leaders: The Political Fate of Caillaux, Jouvenel, and Tardieu. Columbia University Press. 1960. ISBN 978-0-231-90816-0.
- Frau Lou: Nietzsche's Wayward Disciple. Princeton University Press. 1968. ISBN 978-0-691-06142-9.
- Hitler Among the Germans. Elsevier. 1976. ISBN 978-0-444-99033-4.
- Soundings: Psychohistorical and Psycholiterary. Psychohistory Press. 1981. ISBN 978-0-914434-16-0.
- Introduction à la Psychohistoire. Presses Universitaires de France. 1982. ISBN 978-2-13-037398-8.
- After Christianity: Christian Survivals in Post-Christian Culture. Logbridge-Rhodes. 1986. ISBN 978-0-937406-42-7.
- Love Beyond Death: The Anatomy of a Myth in the Arts. NYU Press. 1993. ISBN 978-0-814-71189-7.
- Sounding the Classics: From Sophocles to Thomas Mann. Contributions to the study of world literature (1st ed.). Westport, Conn. London: Praeger. 1997. ISBN 978-0-275-95965-4.
- Past Impersonal: Group Process in Human History. Northern Illinois University Press. 2005. ISBN 978-0-87580-345-6.
- Traumatic Reliving in History, Literature and Film. Karnac Books. 2011. ISBN 978-1-85575-743-1.
