= Carol Jacobs (academic) =

Carol Jacobs is a literary scholar and Birgit Baldwin Professor Emeritus of German and professor emeritus of Comparative Literature at Yale University. Her research interests include modern German, English, and French literature, literary theory from the 18th to 20th centuries, and film.

== Career ==
Jacobs completed her Ph.D. in Comparative Literature at Johns Hopkins University in 1974. She became a Comparative Literature and English professor at SUNY Buffalo before moving to New York University as a professor of German from 2000 to 2002. She was a visiting professor in the Department of German and the Humanities Center at Johns Hopkins University in 1998. Jacobs served as the Birgit Baldwin Professor of German and Comparative Literature at Yale University from 2002 until her retirement in 2017.

Jacobs is a recipient of the Guggenheim Fellowship. She has been a Camargo Foundation Fellow, Whitney Humanities Center Fellow, ACLS Fellow, Honorary Guest Professor of Beijing Normal University and Fellow at Internationales Kolleg Morphomata, University of Cologne.

== Bibliography ==
=== Authored works ===
- The Dissimulating Harmony: Readings of Nietzsche, Artaud, Rilke and Benjamin, Dissertation (1974), published Johns Hopkins University Press, 1978.
- Uncontainable Romanticism: Shelley, Brontë, Kleist, The Johns Hopkins University Press, 1989.
- Telling Time: Lévi-Strauss, Ford, Lessing, Benjamin, de Man, Wordsworth, Rilke, The Johns Hopkins University Press, 1993.
- In the Language of Walter Benjamin, The Johns Hopkins University Press, 1999.
- Skirting the Ethical (Sophocles, Plato, Hamann, Campion, Sebald), Stanford University Press, 2008.
- Sebald's Vision, Columbia University Press, 2015.

=== Articles (selection) ===
- "Walter Benjamin: Image of Proust." Modern Language Notes 86, no. 6 (1971): 910–32.
- "The Monstrosity of Translation." Modern Language Notes 90, no. 6 (1975): 755–766.
- "The Style of Kleist." Diacritics 9, no. 4 (1979): 47–61.
- "On Looking at Shelley's Medusa." Yale French Studies, no. 69 (1985): 163–79.
- "The Critical Performance of Lessing's Laokoon." MLN 102, no. 3 (1987): 483–521.
- Wuthering Heights: "On the Threshold of Interpretation," in the Norton Critical Edition‑‑Emily Brontë, Wuthering Heights, eds. William M. Sale and Richard Dunn (New York: Norton, 1990).
- "Walter Benjamin: Topographically Speaking." Studies in Romanticism 31, no. 4 (1992): 501–24.
- "Playing Jane Campion's Piano: Politically," in Modern Language Notes, vol. 109, December 1994, pp. 757–785.
- "Dusting Antigone" (on Hegel, Irigaray, and Sophocles), Modern Language Notes, December 1996, Volume II, no. 5, pp. 889–917.
- "What Does it Mean to Count?: W. G. Sebald's The Emigrants," Modern Language Notes, December 2004.
- "Walter Benjamin: Image of Proust" reprinted in Walter Benjamin: Critical Evaluations in Cultural Theory, ed. Peter Osborne (New York: Routledge, 2004).
- "Reading, Writing, Hatching (On Sebald's Austerlitz)" in What Does the Veil Know?, ed. Eva Meyer and Vivian Liska (Zurich: Voldemeer) 2009, 130–43.
- "Daniel Kehlmann's Fame: Eight Subjects for Reflection and an Afterword" in Literator 2010. Dozentur für Weltliteratur (Wilhelm Fink Verlag 2012) 205–225.
