= Frede Jensen (philologist) =

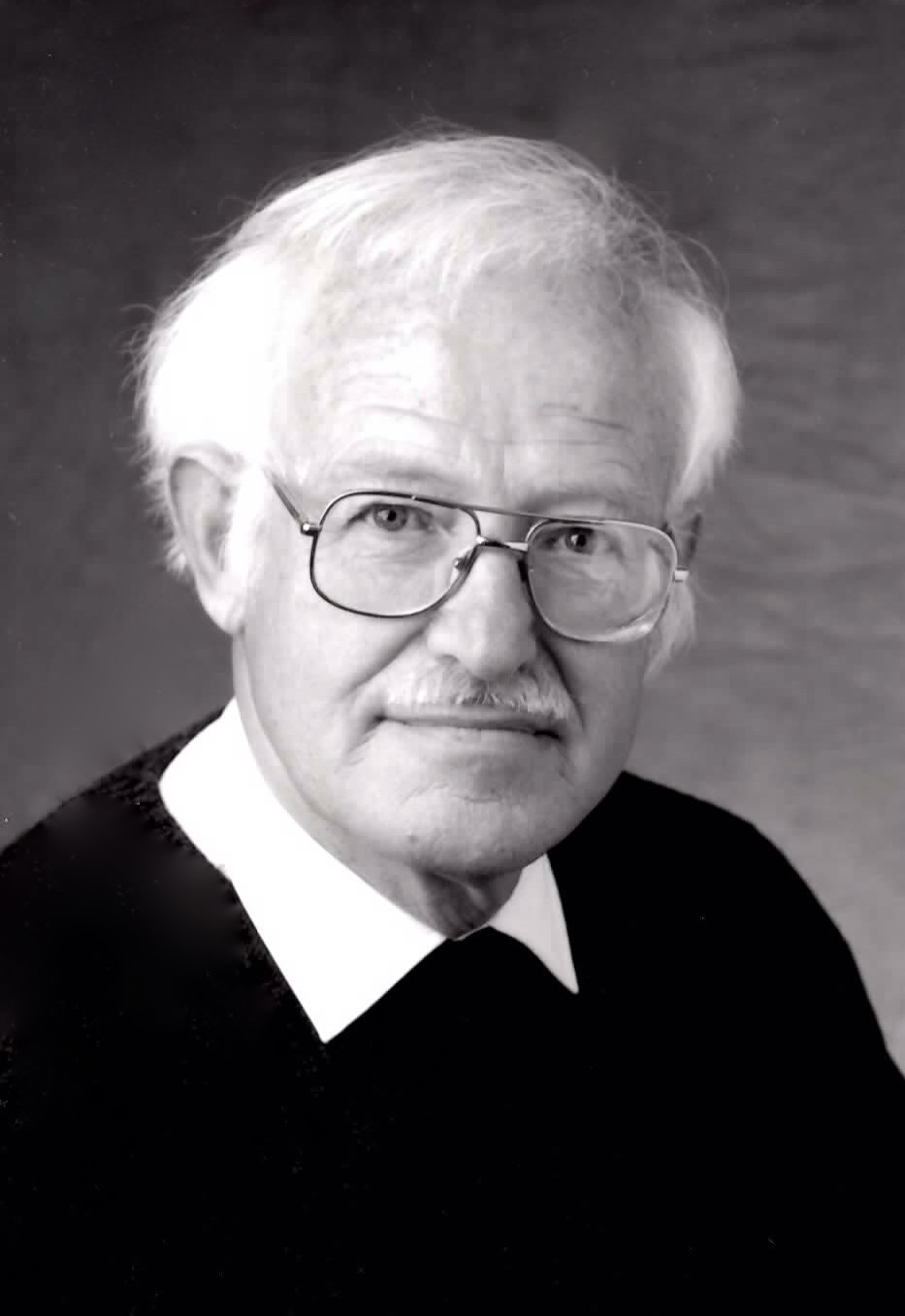
- Frede Jensen, circa 1994
- Born: February 17, 1926; Denmark
- Died: September 13, 2008 (aged 82); Boulder, Colorado, US
- Occupations: Romance philologist, author, university professor

Frede Jensen (February 17, 1926 – September 13, 2008) was a 20th-century, Danish-born Romance philologist, author, and professor of French.

Author of 17 books and over 60 articles, he was widely respected by the Romance philology community and recognized as an expert in the field. He is highly esteemed for his detailed and thorough publications on the grammar of Old Occitan (also referred to as Provençal) and has been referred to endearingly as "the 'Grevisse' of old Occitan". Jensen is also considered an expert on Sicilian poetry. His English translation and analysis of previously untranslated Sicilian poems have been honorably referred to as one of the codices optimi on the subject, dating from Dante forward.

As a linguist, Jensen was fluent in eight languages with a command of medieval/ancient Romance languages. His publications include works on vulgar and classical Latin, old Italian, old Spanish, medieval Occitan, old French, and old Portuguese.

== Life ==
Frede Jensen was born on February 17, 1926, to Hans Jensen and Jenny Kirstine Martinusen in Taarup, Auning county, in the Midtjylland region of Denmark. Frede was the second of three children born to the Jensen family. He spent his first years in a sizable family homestead and was raised by his two loving parents. The property was home to a lovely forest where oak, pine, and beech trees grew. These early surroundings were likely the mold from where Frede's great sensibility to nature was formed.

The Great Depression arrived with its share of sufferings and soon the family had to relocate to a smaller house in the nearby small village of Trojstrup. Frede lived there with his family until he graduated from the Randers Stattskole in 1945.

When he was a young teenager, he loved collecting and drying flowers from the countryside. His collection later ended up in the hands of the Museum of the Botanical Garden of Copenhagen, where they are still preserved today.

In 1945, Jensen went to the University of Copenhagen and completed his undergraduate studies in 1949. Jensen then attended the Université de Grenoble in France on a scholarship where he received a degree in French grammar and philology (Certificat de Grammaire et de Philologie Francaises) in 1950.

While in Grenoble he joined a mountaineering club. For him it was the door that opened to the undulating slopes of wildflowers, before setting his sights on higher summits later in his life.

Jensen returned to Denmark to serve his mandatory 9-month military service from 1950 to 1951 where he served as a telex operator.

Jensen then returned to the University of Copenhagen where he received his master's degree, with distinction, in 1953 in French with a minor in English.

He spent the summer of 1953 studying at the University of Santiago de Compostela in Spain, then went on to attend the University of Salamanca, Spain where he received a Spanish philology degree in 1955 (Diplomado de Filologia Hispánica). It was here that he met his future wife, whom he later wed in the United States in 1968.

In 1956, Jensen moved to Los Angeles, California in the United States on a Fulbright grant and subsequently earned his PhD from U.C.L.A. in 1961, in Romance languages and Literatures with an emphasis in philology (French, Spanish, and Italian).

Over the next 6 years, Jensen held a number of teaching positions, first at the University of Calgary, Canada and then at U.C.L.A., before settling in Boulder, Colorado to take on a professorship position at the University of Colorado in 1967. Jensen was Professor of French at the University of Colorado at Boulder until his retirement on June 19, 1996.

Jensen was the recipient of numerous awards for scholarly achievements throughout his career. He also served as the President of the Centre de Guillaume IX, a center for research in Troubadour studies, and was a member of the editorial board of Semasia (a romance philology publication).

He was also an avid mountaineer who summited hundreds of peaks in Canada, Mexico, Morocco, Europe and the United States, and he climbed all fifty three of Colorado's 14,000-foot peaks within two summers. He continued to hike regularly up until his death in September 2008, in Boulder, Colorado, at the age of 82.

A portion of his personal library, including many of his own works, has been donated to the University of California, Santa Cruz, and to the Norlin library at the University of Colorado, Boulder in support of research in Romance philology and linguistics.

== Education ==
- Middle school, a private school in Allingaabro, Denmark
- High school studies at Randers Stattskole in Randers, Denmark, graduating in June 1945
- University of Copenhagen, 1949 (BA)
- Université de Grenoble, France, 1950, Certificat de Grammaire et de Philologie Françaises
- University of Copenhagen 1953, M.A. (with distinction) with major in French and a minor in English
- University of Salamanca, Spain, 1955, Diplomado de Filologia Hispánica
- U.C.L.A., California, US1961, PhD in Romance languages and literatures, with major emphasis on philology (French, Spanish, Italian)

== Professional career ==
- University of Washington at Seattle, 1956–57, Teaching Assistant, Department of Romance Languages.
- U.C.L.A, 1957–60, Teaching Assistant, Department of French.
- Katedralskole, Nykøbing (Falster), Denmark, 1960–1961, Acting Instructor in French and English.
- University of Calgary, 1961–64, Assistant Professor of Modern Languages.
- U.C.L.A., 1964–67, Assistant Professor of French and Romance Philology.
- University of Colorado at Boulder, 1967–73, Associate Professor of French and Linguistics.
- University of Colorado at Boulder, 1973–77, Professor of French and Linguistics.
- University of Colorado at Boulder, 1977–1996, Professor of French.

== Publications ==
=== Books ===
Books:

1. The Italian Verb, A Morphological Study, University of North Carolina Press, Studies in the Romance Languages and Literatures, No. 107, 1971. 97 pp.
2. From Vulgar Latin to Old Provençal. University of North Carolina Press, Studies in the Romance Languages and Literatures, No. 120, 1972. 97 pp.
3. F. Jensen and T. Lathrop: The Syntax of the Old Spanish Subjunctive. The Hague: Mouton Publishers, Janua Linguarum Series, 1973. 92 pp.
4. The Syntax of the Old French Subjunctive. The Hague: Mouton Publishers, Janua Lunguarum Series,1974. 134 pp.
5. The Old Provençal Noun and Adjective Declension. Odense University Press, Études romanes de l'Université d'Odense, Vol. 9, 1976. 177 pp.
6. The Earliest Portuguese Lyrics. Odense University Press, Études romanes de l'Université d'Odense, Vol. 11, 1978. 308 pp.
7. Provençal Philology and the Poetry of Guillaume of Poitiers. Odense University Press, Études romanes de l'Université d'Odense, Vol. 13, 1983. 374 pp.
8. The Poetry of the Sicilian School. New York and London: Garland Publishing, Inc., Garland Library of Medieval Literature, Series A, Vol. 22, 1986. I-LXXIII. 250pp
9. The Syntax of Medieval Occitan. Tübingen/West Germany: Max Niemeyer Verlag, Beihefte zur Zeitschirft für romanische Philologie, Vol. 208, 1986. I-VII. 431 pp.
10. Old French and Comparative Gallo-Romance Syntax. Tübingen/West Germany: Max Niemeyer Verlag, Beihefte zur Zeitschirft für romanische Philologie, Vol. 232, 1990. I-XI. 590 pp.
11. Medieval Galician-Portuguese Poetry. An Anthology. New York and London: Garland Publishing, Inc., Garland Library of Medieval Literature, Series A, Vol. 87 1992. I-CXXXVIII. 624 pp. (see review)
12. Syntaxe de l'ancien occitan. Tübingen/West Germany: Max Niemeyer Verlag, Beihefte zur Zeitschift für romanische Philologie, Vol. 257, 1994. 404 pp.
13. Tuscan Poetry of the Duecento. New York and London: Garland Publishing, Inc., Garland Library of Medieval Literature, Series A, Vol. 99, 1994, I-XLV, 335 pp.
14. Troubadour Lyrics. A Bilingual Anthology. New York: Peter Lang Publishing, Studies in the Humanities, vol. 39, 1998, 593 pp.
15. A Comparative Study of Romance. New York: Peter Lang Publishing, Studies in the Humanities, vol. 46, 1999, 446 pp.
16. La Vie de Saint Eustace. Introduction to Old French. Philological Commentary by Frede Jensen. Edition and Introduction by Tom Lathrop. Newark/Delaware: LinguaText, Ltd., 2000, 208 pp.
17. The language of the eleventh century "Vie de St. Alexis". Edition by Tom Lathrop. Newark/Delaware: LinguaText, Ltd., 2003, 367 pp.
