= Edwin M. Duval =

American literary scholar (born 1947)

Edwin M. Duval (born 11 January 1947) is a literary scholar specializing in works of the French Renaissance.

Duval completed his bachelor's degree at Stanford University in 1968, followed by a master's degree and doctorate from Yale University in 1971 and 1973, respectively. Upon obtaining his doctorate, Duval joined the Princeton University faculty. In 1977, he began teaching at the University of California, Santa Barbara. Duval returned to Yale as a professor in 1987, and was named Henri Peyre Professor of French in 2012.
