= Sidonie Smith =

Professor of English, women's and gender studies

Sidonie Smith is the Lorna G. Goodison Distinguished University Professor Emerita of English and Women's and Gender Studies at the University of Michigan. She is known for her work on autobiography studies, narrative and human rights, feminist theories, and women’s studies in literature.

== Education ==
Smith earned her undergraduate degree in English Language and Literature from the University of Michigan in April 1966 and her master’s degree in English Language and Literature from the University of Michigan in December 1966. In 1971, she received her doctorate in English Literature from Case Western Reserve University.

== Career ==
Smith taught at the University of Arizona from 1973 until 1983. From 1983-1996 she worked at Binghamton University, where she served as interim dean from 1987 until 1990. Smith moved to the University of Michigan in 1996 where she was a full professor in the women's studies program. In 2017 she was named the Lorna G. Goodison Distinguished University Professor of English and Women’s Studies.

Smith served as president for the Modern Language Association from 2010 to 2011.

== Selected publications ==
- Smith, Sidonie; Walker, Robert H. (1974). Where I'm Bound: Patterns of Slavery and Freedom in Black Autobiography. Bloomsbury Publishing.
- Smith, Sidonie (1987). A Poetics of Women's Autobiography. Bloomington, Ind.: Indiana Univ. Press. ISBN 0-253-20443-7.
- Smith, Sidonie (1993). Subjectivity, Identity, and the Body: Women&#39;s Autobiographical Practices in the Twentieth Century. Bloomington: Indiana University Press.
- Smith, Sidonie; Watson, Julia (2002). Interfaces. Ann Arbor: University of Michigan Press. ISBN 978-0-472-06814-2.
- Schaffer, Kay; Smith, Sidonie (2004). Human Rights and Narrated Lives. New York: Palgrave Macmillan US. doi:10.1057/9781403973665. ISBN 978-1-4039-6495-3.
- Smith, Sidonie; Watson, Julia (2010). Reading Autobiography. Minneapolis: University of Minnesota Press. ISBN 978-0-8166-6986-8. OCLC 559860857.
- Smith, Sidonie; Watson, Julia (2012). "Witness or False Witness?: Metrics of Authenticity, Collective I-Formations, and the Ethic of Verification in First-Person Testimony". Biography. 35 (4): 590–626. ISSN 0162-4962.
- Smith, Sidonie Ann (2015-11-25). Manifesto for the Humanities. Ann Arbor: University of Michigan Press. ISBN 0-472-07304-4.
- Smith, Sidonie; Watson, Julia (2024). Reading Autobiography Now. Minneapolis: University of Minnesota Press. ISBN 1-5179-1688-7.
