= Sage Ni'Ja Whitson =

American interdisciplinary artist and performer

- Occupations: Artist, Writer, Performer, Performance Artist, Choreographer, Founder/Artistic Director of The NWA Project

Sage Ni'Ja Whitson is an artist, performer, writer and the founder/artistic director of The NWA Project. Whitson is transmasculine and uses the pronouns they/them.

== Career ==
An international artist working across art and technology, live performance, and writing, Whitson has received awards across multiple disciplines. A Bessie-Award-winning performer and choreographer, Whitson has been referred to as "majestic" and "magnetic" by The New York Times, and is recognized by Brooklyn Magazine as being one of the 100 culture influencers. Awards include a DAAD Artist in Berlin Fellowship, USA Artist Fellow, Dance USA Fellowship, Creative Capital Awardee, LMCC Process Space Residency, Bogliasco Fellowship, Brooklyn Arts Exchange Artist Residency, and two-time Creative Capital "On Our Radar" award, including being an inaugural recipient.

Whitson is a Professor in the Department of Black Study at the University of California, Riverside. and served as its inaugural chair from 2023-2025.

== Works ==
=== Exhibitions ===
- These Waking Glories (2025)
- Transtraterrestrial (2023, 2025)
- Illumination Catalogue (2021-2025)
- Oba Qween Baba King Baba (2019)
- A Meditation on Tongues (2017)
- Quasar (2015)
- Summons and Arrival (2015)
- Tribute to Malachi Maghostut Favors (2015)
- When Water Dries the Mouth (2015)

=== Books ===
- Whitson, Sage Ni'Ja (November 4, 2025). Transtraterrestrial: Dark Matter and Black Divinities. Wesleyan University Press. ISBN 9780819501998.
