= Jane Lackey =

American artist (b. 1948)

- Born: 1948 (age 77–78); Chattanooga, Tennessee, U.S.
- Education: California College of the Arts, Cranbrook Academy of Art
- Occupations: Visual artist, educator
- Known for: Mixed media art, fiber art
- Website: www.janelackey.com

Jane Lackey (born 1948), is an American visual artist and educator, primarily working in mixed media art and fiber art. She was named a fellow of the American Craft Council (ACC) in 2014. Lackey lives in Santa Fe, New Mexico since 2009.

== Biography ==
Jane Lackey was born in 1948, in Chattanooga, Tennessee. Lackey attended the University of Tennessee, Knoxville (now the University of Tennessee, from 1966 to 1968), the University of California, Los Angeles (in 1969); and she received a BFA degree in 1974 from the California College of the Arts, and a MFA degree in 1979 from Cranbrook Academy of Art.

She taught and chair of the fiber arts department from 1980 to 1997 at the Kansas City Art Institute. Followed by heading the fiber arts department from 1997 until 2007 at Cranbrook Academy of Art. She also taught at Santa Fe University of Art and Design.

Her artwork can be found in museum collections, including the Cranbrook Art Museum, the Detroit Institute of Arts, and the James A. Michener Collection at Kent State University.
