= Linda Plotkin =

American printmaker

- Born: 1938 (age 87–88); Milwaukee, WI

Linda Plotkin (born 1938) is an American printmaker. Her work is included in the collections of the Madison Museum of Contemporary Art, Smithsonian American Art Museum, the Metropolitan Museum of Art, the Art Institute of Chicago and the Museum of Modern Art, New York.

in 2022, Plotkin's work was included "HOME/STUDIO: 2022 Penn State School of Visual Arts Faculty Show," as part of the 50th anniversary of the Palmer Museum of Art at Penn State.
