= Melissa Kirsch =

American author (born 1974)

Melissa Kirsch (born 1974) is an American author who writes predominantly about media, politics, and women's issues. Her most recent book, The Girl’s Guide, provides advice to women on topics ranging from financial issues to dating. Currently, Kirsch lives in New York City, blogs for the Huffington Post, and writes the "My Secret Library" column for the KGB Bar Lit.

== Early life and education ==
Kirsch is from Westport, Connecticut, where she attended Staples High School.

Kirsch completed her undergraduate studies at the University of Virginia in 1996. She then completed a Master's in Creative Writing at New York University.

== Career ==
Kirsch's professional writing career began in 1998 when she was working as a senior producer for Oxygen Media and editing the Girls On website. Kirsch also wrote the advice column “Ask Princess” for Oxygen Media.

Other works by Kirsch include her poem "Sleep's Underside" in Acquainted with the Night (a collection of poems about insomnia) and various articles, which have been featured in Nerve, Good Housekeeping, Ladies' Home Journal, National Geographic Traveler, New York, and Scientific American.

Kirsch wrote the advice book for women in The Girl’s Guide. She also blogs for the Huffington Post.

Kirsch was editor-in-chief of the website Lifehacker and hosted the podcast The Upgrade.

She was a finalist for a James Beard Award in Journalism in 2009 and was a fellow at the MacDowell Colony in 2014.

Kirsch's poetry has been published in North American Review, Meridien, Northwest Review, Cincinnati Review, Indiana Review and Fence.

Her essay “Most Helpful Critical Review” was published in Southwest Review and was cited as a Notable Essay in Best American Essays 2015.

Kirsch started writing for The New York Times in 2020. As of 2024, she is the Times deputy editor of Culture and Lifestyle, and writes weekly columns published on Saturdays for the paper's The Morning newsletter.

== Selected works ==
- The Girl’s Guide to Absolutely Everything (Workman, 2007)
- The Girl’s Guide (Workman, 2015)
