= Renée Riese Hubert =

American writer and academic (1916–2005)

Renée Riese Hubert (July 2, 1916 – May 18, 2005) was a German-born American writer and academic.

The daughter of two Jewish physicians, she was born Renée Riese in Wiesbaden and emigrated to France with her parents in 1933. She received a bachelor's degree from the University of Paris, Sorbonne. Hubert moved to London at the beginning of World War II and then joined her parents in Virginia in 1944. Hubert received a PhD from Columbia University. She taught French and comparative literature at the University of California, Irvine. She published at least six books of French poetry (the first, entitled Le Cité borgne, came out in 1953) and over 175 articles and wrote extensively on surrealism and the interaction of verbal and visual in artists' books.

Hubert received a Guggenheim Fellowship, a senior National Endowment for the Humanities fellowship and the University of California Constantine Panunzio Distinguished Emeriti Award.

She married Judd Hubert, who was a French professor at the University of California, Irvine.

Hubert died from a heart attack at Hoag Hospital in Newport Beach at the age of 89.

== Selected works ==
- Surrealism and the Book (1992)
- Magnifying Mirrors: Women, Surrealism, and Partnership (1994)
- The Cutting Edge of Reading: Artists' Books, with Judd Hubert (1998)
- Cultural (Dis)connections: Memoirs of a Surrealist Scholar, autobiography (2006)
