= Kevin Kopelson =

American literary critic

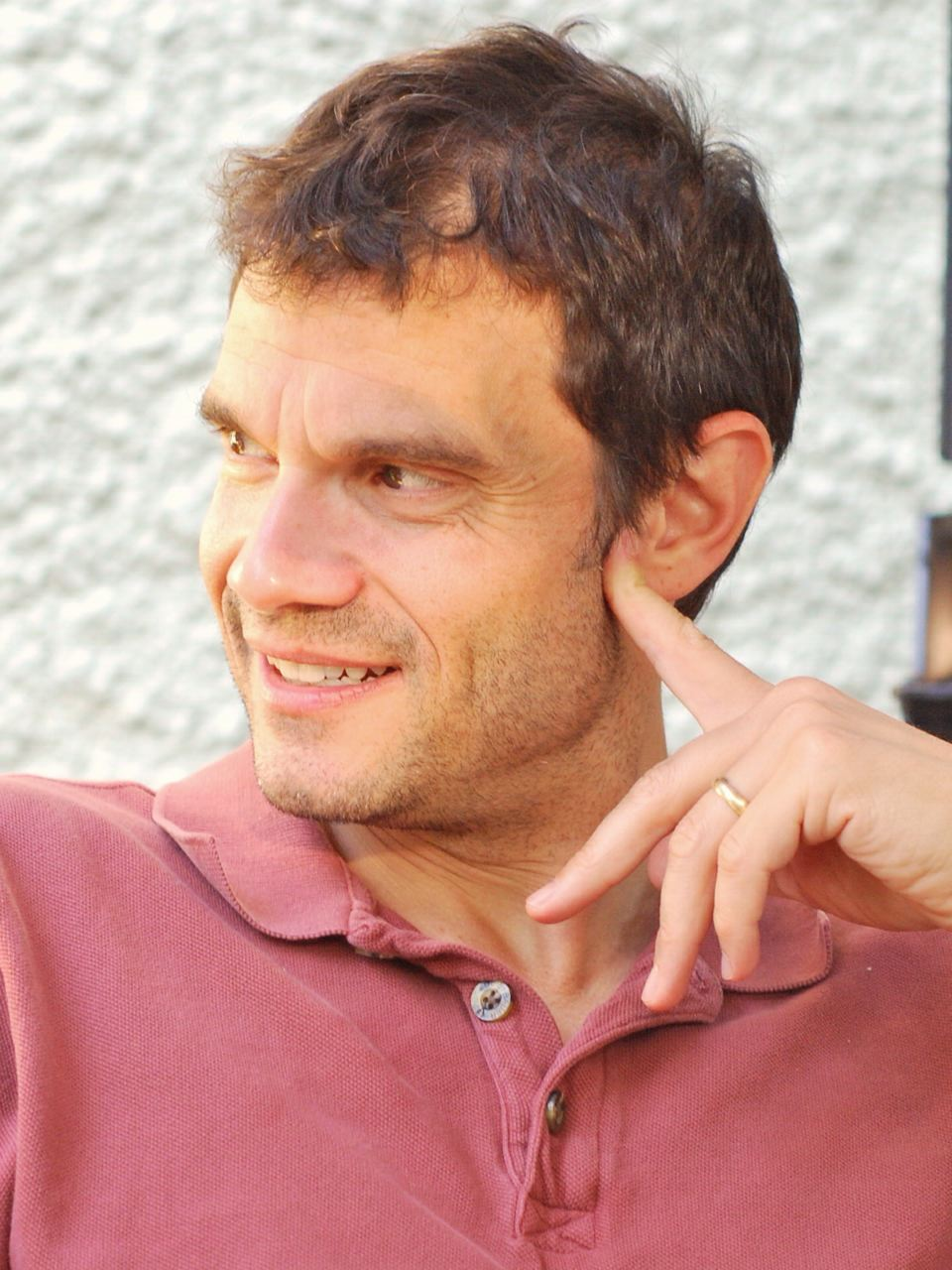
- Years active: 1994–present

Academic background
- Education: University of Iowa
- Influences: Roland Barthes

Academic work
- Main interests: Gender studies literary criticism cultural studies 20th century in literature

Kevin Kopelson is an American literary critic. He received a B.A. from Yale University, a J.D. from Columbia University, and a Ph.D. from Brown University. Currently, he is Emeritus Professor of English at The University of Iowa.

He is a contributor to the London Review of Books. He writes on topics ranging from fin-de-siècle literature to fashion photography.

== Fields ==
Kopelson has published in the fields of sexuality studies, critical theory, cultural studies, and 20th-century literature.

== Works ==
- Love's Litany: The Writing of Modern Homoerotics (Stanford University Press, 1994).
- Beethoven's Kiss: Pianism, Perversion, and the Mastery of Desire (Stanford University Press, 1996).
- The Queer Afterlife of Vaslav Nijinsky (Stanford University Press, 1997).
- Finishing Proust (2000)
- Neatness Counts: Essays on the Writer's Desk (University of Minnesota Press, 2004).
- Sedaris (University of Minnesota Press, 2007).
- Confessions of a Plagiarist: And Other Tales from School (Counterpath Press, 2012).
- Adorno and the Showgirl: Or Late Style (2016)
