= Paul Elwood =

American classical composer

Paul Iserman Elwood (born 1958, died 2025) was a composer and banjo player from Greeley, Colorado. He received his B.M.E. at Wichita State University and his M.M. in composition from Southern Methodist University and his Ph.D. in Composition from the State University of New York at Buffalo. He served on the faculty at Brevard College in North Carolina where he taught composition, music theory and sight singing. In the fall of 1998 he was the Southern Regional Visiting Composer at the American Academy in Rome. He is currently a professor at the University of Northern Colorado.

== List of works ==
- "Let's Go Pet The Lion: an example of minor 6ths"
- Over Looking Glass Falls (2006), orchestra, premiered February 2007 by the North Carolina Symphony. The concert was broadcast by WCPE-FM on July 2, 2007.
- Psalm Eight (2005), mixed chorus (SATB), King James text.
- Winter Fires (2005), women's chorus (SAA), Text by David St. John.
- Hymn (2005), women's chorus (SAA), Text by Jack Kerouac.
- In the Middle (2005), mixed chorus (SATB), Text by Paul Elwood.
- Capricious Apparitions for 2 violas and bowed banjo (2009)
