= Michael Lewis-Beck =

American political scientist (born 1943)

Michael S. Lewis-Beck
- Born: Michael Steven Lewis; October 29, 1943 (age 82)
- Education: Ball State University; University of Michigan
- Known for: Comparative politics Political forecasting Political methodology
- Scientific career
- Fields: Political science
- Workplaces: University of Iowa
- Thesis: Organizational innovation in a third world nation: hospitals in Peru (1973)
- Doctoral advisor: Lawrence Mohr

Michael Steven Lewis-Beck (born October 29, 1943) is an American political scientist and the F. Wendell Miller Distinguished Professor of Political Science at the University of Iowa. His research focuses on comparative politics, political forecasting, and political methodology.

== Education and career ==
Lewis-Beck earned a Bachelor of Arts with honors from Ball State University in (1965). He also has a Master of Arts and a Ph.D. from the University of Michigan. He earned his MA in August 1966, taking a gap in studies through 1966 to 1968 to serve in the Peace Corps in Guatemala. He earned his Ph.D. five years later in December 1973.

Lewis-Beck maintains his status as Professor Emeritus at the University of Iowa since 2010. As of November 2024, he has over 32,000 citations on Google Scholar and has authored or co-authored over 330 articles and books. Professor Beck's main areas of study are comparative politics, methodology, Western Europe, and the political economy.

He was formerly the editor-in-chief of the American Journal of Political Science from 1993 to 1994 and a past president of the Political Forecasting Group of the American Political Science Association.

He was a visiting professor at Harvard University, University of London, GESIS-Leibniz Institute for the Social Sciences, University of Copenhagen, LUISS University, University of Leuven, Koc University, University of Siena, Italy, Universitat Autònoma de Barcelona, University of Manchester, Universidad Autónoma de Madrid, University of Nantes, and Institut d’Etudes Politiques.

== Media ==
Lewis-Beck has received media attention for his predictions of the results of United States presidential elections based on economic factors. Lewis-Beck told ABC News that the economy is "always at or near the top of the average voter’s agenda."

He predicted that George H. W. Bush would win the 1992 presidential election, that Bill Clinton would win in 1996, and that Al Gore would win easily in 2000, telling the Washington Post that May that "It's not even going to be close." After Gore lost the 2000 election, Lewis-Beck modified his model to take job growth during the incumbent president's previous four-year term into account. He predicted in August 2004 that George W. Bush would receive 51% of the vote in that November's election, making it too close to call. Using the "Jobs Model", a model based on Gross National Product and growth in jobs, Lewis-Beck predicted Barack Obama would lose the 2012 election. In 2016, he correctly predicted a 51% two-party popular vote share for Hillary Clinton. Using polls on voter expectations for the winning presidential candidate in the 2024 election, Lewis-Beck forecast a victory by Kamala Harris.

== Personal life ==
Lewis-Beck resides in Iowa City, Iowa.

Lewis-Beck is fluent in English, French, Spanish, and Italian.

Lewis-Beck writes poetry, lyrics, fiction, and essays. He has two books of poems, Rural Routes and Shorter and Sweeter published by Alexandria Quarterly Press.

== Books ==
- Stubager, R., Hansen, K. M., Lewis-Beck, M. S., & Nadeau, R. (2021). The Danish voter: Democratic Ideals and Challenges. University of Michigan Press. ISBN 9780472132263.
- Nadeau, R., Bélanger, E., Lewis-Beck, M. S., Turgeon, M., Gélineau, F., & Ratto, M. C. (2019). Elecciones Latinoamericanas: Selección y Cambio de Voto. P.I.E-Peter Lang. ISBN 9782807609525.
- Dassonneville, R., Hooghe, M., & Lewis-Beck, M. S. (Eds.). (2018). Electoral Rules and Electoral Behaviour: The Scope of Effects. Routledge, Taylor & Francis Group. ISBN 9780367892586.
- Nadeau, R., Bélanger, E., Lewis-Beck, M. S., Turgeon, M., & Gélineau, F. (2017). Latin American Elections: Choice and Change. University of Michigan Press. ISBN 9780472130221.
- Kritzinger, S., Lewis-Beck, M. S., Nadeau, R., & Zeglovits, E. (2013). The Austrian Voter. Vienna University Press. ISBN 978-3847101666.
- Lewis-Beck, M. S., Nadeau, R., & Bélanger, E. (2012). French Presidential Elections. Palgrave Macmillan. ISBN 978-1-349-33582-4.
- Lewis-Beck, M. S., Norpoth, H., Jacoby, W. G., & Weisberg, H. F. (2008). The American Voter Revisited. University of Michigan Press. ISBN 9780472050406.
- Lewis-Beck, M. S. (2004). The French Voter: Before and After the 2002 Elections. Palgrave Macmillan. ISBN 978-1349432325.
- Lewis-Beck, M. S. (1995). Data Analysis: An Introduction. Sage Publications. ISBN 978-0803957725.
- Lewis-Beck, M. S., & Rice, T. W. (1992). Forecasting Elections. CQ Press. ISBN 978-0871876003.
- Norpoth, H., Lewis-Beck, M. S., & Lafay, J.-D. (1991). Economics and Politics: The Calculus of Support. University of Michigan Press. ISBN 978-0472101863.
- Lewis-Beck, M. S. (1988). Economics and elections: The Major Western Democracies. University of Michigan Press. ISBN 9780472081332.
- Berry, W. D., & Lewis-Beck, M. S. (1986). New Directions in Social Science Research: Methods and Applications. Sage Publications. ISBN 978-0803922563.
- Eulau, H., & Lewis-Beck, M. S. (Eds.). (1985). Economic conditions and electoral outcomes: The United States and Western Europe. Agathon Press. ISBN 978-0875860718.
- Lewis-Beck, M. S. (1980). Applied Regression: An Introduction. Sage Publications. ISBN 978-0803914940.
