= Six Sonatas for Violin and Harpsichord, BWV 1014–1019 =

Works by J. S. Bach

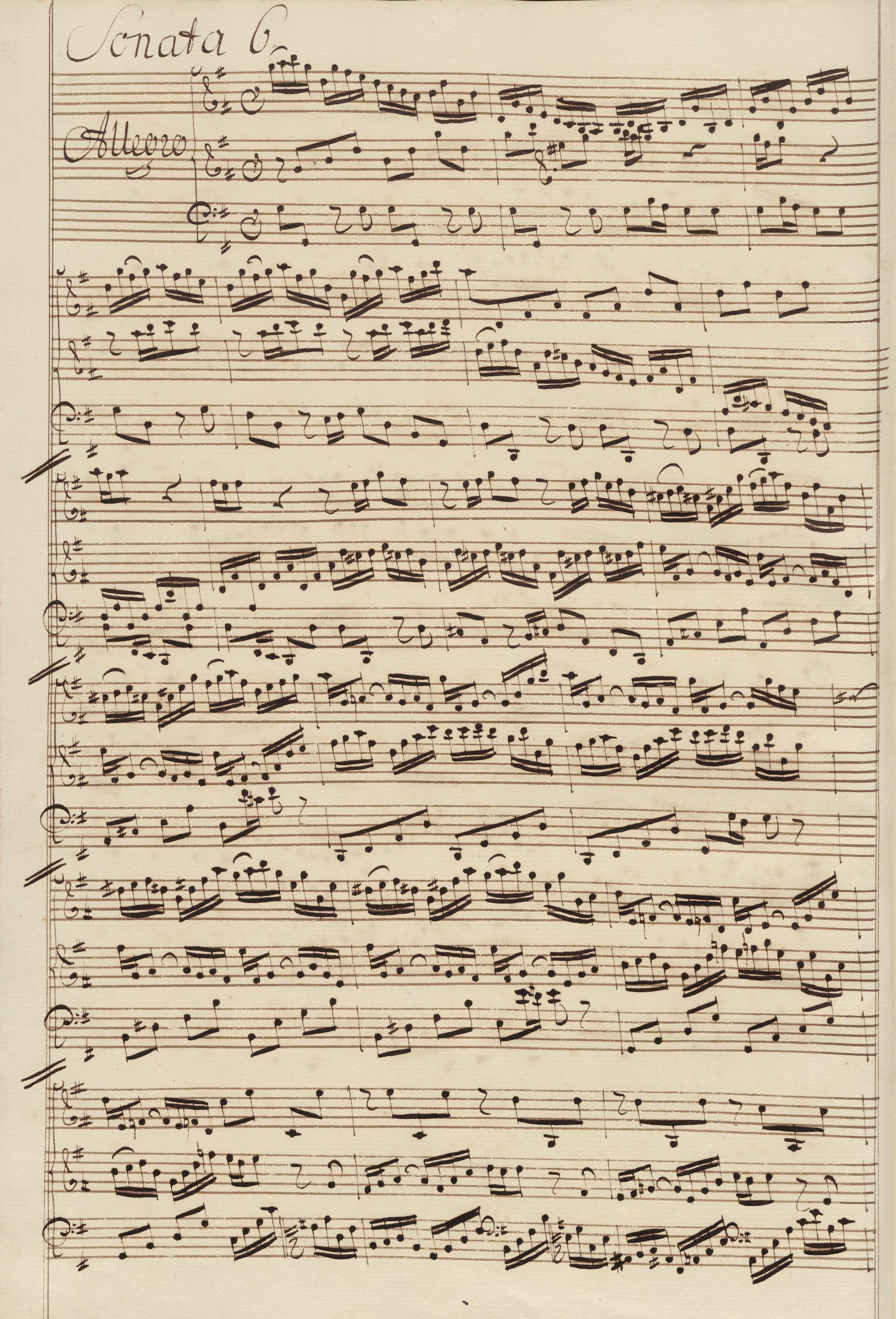
Manuscript of the first movement of BWV 1019, third version, copied by Johann Christoph Altnickol

The six sonatas for violin and obbligato harpsichord BWV 1014–1019 by Johann Sebastian Bach are works in trio sonata form, with the two upper parts in the harpsichord and violin over a bass line supplied by the harpsichord and an optional viola da gamba. Unlike baroque sonatas for solo instrument and continuo, where the realisation of the figured bass was left to the discretion of the performer, the keyboard part in the sonatas was almost entirely specified by Bach. They were probably mostly composed during Bach's final years in Cöthen between 1720 and 1723, before he moved to Leipzig. The extant sources for the collection span the whole of Bach's period in Leipzig, during which time he continued to make changes to the score.

== Origins and compositional history ==
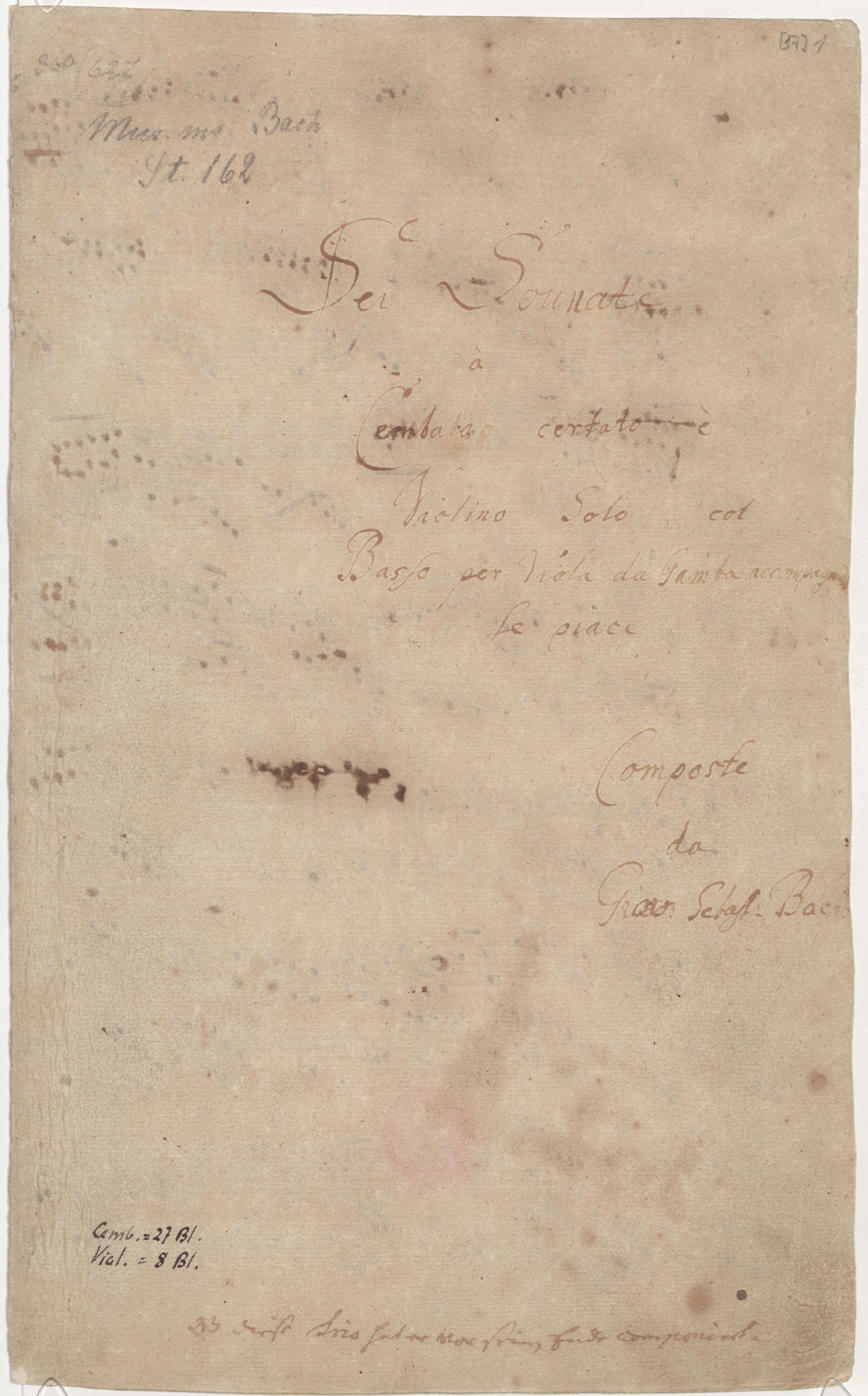
Title page from 1725 manuscript of BWV 1014–1019. It reads Sounate â Cembalo [con]certato è Violino Solo, col Basso per Viola da Gamba accompagnato se piace. Composte da Giov: Sebast: Bach

Bach's sonatas for violin and obbligato harpsichord were composed in trio sonata form, i.e. three independent parts consisting of two equally matched upper voices above a bass line. Instead of playing the role of a continuo instrument, filling in the harmonies of a figured bass, the harpsichord took one of the upper melodic lines on equal terms with the violin, whilst also providing the bass line (which could be reinforced if desired by the addition of a viola da gamba).

In the totality of Bach's musical output, the instrumental sonatas written in trio sonata form are small in number. Apart from the BWV 1014–1019, there are the six organ sonatas, BWV 525–530, the three sonatas for viola da gamba and harpsichord, BWV 1027–1029, and the three sonatas for flute and harpsichord, BWV 1030, BWV 1031 and BWV 1032. In each case the trio sonata texture derives from the compositional form and not the particular combination of instruments, which was partly a function of the musicians at Bach's disposal. This is well illustrated by the first movement of the organ sonata BWV 528 which originated as the sinfonia starting the second part of the cantata, BWV 76, with oboe d'amore and viola da gamba as solo instruments; and likewise by the trio sonata for two flutes and continuo BWV 1039 and its alternative version for viola da gamba and obbligato harpsichord, BWV 1027.

Although it had been believed for some time—and advanced as a theory by Eppstein (1966)—that the sonatas BWV 1014–1019 must have originated in lost trio sonatas for two instruments and continuo, no prior versions have been discovered and it is accepted that only a few movements could have such an origin. The first known source from 1725, in the handwriting of Bach's nephew Johann Heinrich Bach, explicitly specifies an obbligato harpsichord; and, despite the fact that a later version in the hand of Bach's pupil Johann Friedrich Agricola has a marginal "Violin I" at the start of BWV 1014, the scoring of the upper part in the keyboard, especially in the adagio movements BWV 1016/i, BWV 1017/iii and BWV 1018/iii, uses figures that are idiomatic to a keyboard instrument but unsuited to other instruments. Although this compositional style became widespread in the late eighteenth century, in Bach's day it was unusual and innovative. Although all the sonatas are written in trio sonata form, each has its own distinct character—the third is an example of the Sonate auf Concertenart, a sonata written in the style of a concerto. Throughout his life Bach returned to the sonatas to refine and perfect the score, particularly in the last sonata, which survives in three different versions.

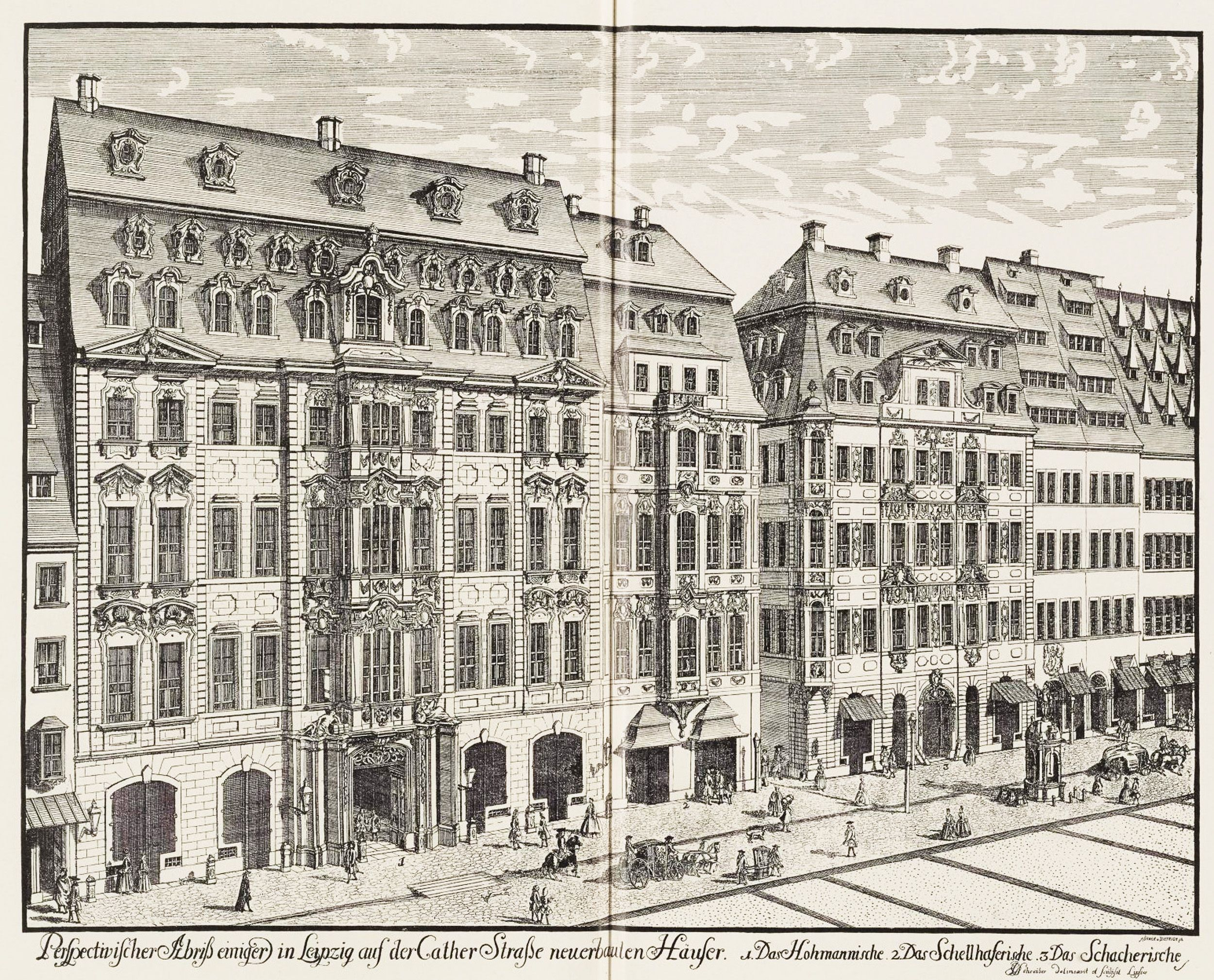
Johann Georg Schreiber, 1720: Engraving of Katherinenstrasse in Leipzig. In the centre is Café Zimmermann, where the Collegium Musicum held weekly chamber music concerts

When Wolfgang Schmieder created the chronology for the BWV catalogue of Bach's works in the 1950s, the assumption was that Bach's musical output matched his responsibilities in each of the three distinct phases in his career: the period 1700–1717 when he was organist at Lüneburg, Arnstadt, Mühlhausen and Weimar; the period 1717–1723 when he was Capellmeister at Cöthen; and the period from 1723 onwards when he served as Thomaskantor in Leipzig. Accordingly, the chamber music works by Bach were automatically assigned to the Cöthen period. Later generations of Bach scholars have recognized that Bach's involvement with chamber and orchestral music continued in Leipzig, especially through the Collegium Musicum; and accordingly Schmieder's rigid chronology is no longer generally accepted. Nevertheless, even though there is no direct confirmation for the dating of BWV 1014–1019, Bach scholars agree that the circumstances surrounding the 1725 source probably point to the first versions of these sonatas being composed between 1720 and 1723 during Bach's last years in Cöthen. In the 1958 Neue Bach-Ausgabe edition, the editor and musicologist Rudolf Gerber was unaware that the 1725 manuscript had been largely copied by Bach's nephew, who was only a pupil at the Thomasschule at the time. In addition two of the three last movements in the sixth sonata copied by Bach himself were borrowed from the sixth keyboard partita BWV 830, movements also included in the 1725 Notenbüchlein for Bach's wife Anna Magdalena Bach. This suggests that the initial collection of sonatas, assembled for an unknown purpose, was probably copied from pre-existing compositions and hastily completed. This hypothesis is not only compatible with Bach's heavy compositional duties as Thomaskantor at the start of his period in Leipzig; but also agrees with the dating of the sonatas to Cöthen by Bach's biographer Johann Nikolaus Forkel: a letter to him in 1774 from Bach's son Carl Philipp Emanuel describes the sonatas as being 50 years old.

The history of the sixth sonata BWV 1019 is distinct from that of the five others. The three different versions of the sonata and its successive comprehensive modifications in Leipzig indicate that its role in the collection evolved only gradually. The two first movements, a large scale concerto allegro and a short largo, remained largely unaltered throughout these revisions and were copied by Bach's nephew Johann Heinrich into the earliest surviving manuscript from 1725. The originals, assumed to date from Cöthen, are lost; but it is probable that these were the first two movements of a three-movement Sonate auf Concertenart. In the 1725 manuscript the remaining movements were entered by Bach himself. The sonata took the following form:

1. Vivace, G major
2. Largo, E minor
3. Harpsichord solo, E minor
4. Adagio, B minor and G minor
5. Violin solo with figured bass, G minor
6. Vivace, G major (repeat of opening movement)

The solo movements provide a contrast with the other movements, which are duos for violin and obbligato harpsichord; moreover as dance movements they add variety and lightness to the set, making it more like a dance suite. The harpsichord solo was later published in Bach's Clavier-Übung I as the Corrente in BWV 830, the sixth of the keyboard partitas; before that it had already been entered into Anna Magdalena's Notebook. The violin solo, with the harpsichord providing a simple figured bass accompaniment, was an early version of the Tempo di Gavotta from the same partita. Only the harpsichord part survives, but the violin solo for the fifth movement has been reconstructed without difficulty from the score of BWV 830; the missing violin part for the short Adagio has been recovered from the second version of the sonata.

After the publication of Clavier-Übung I, probably in the late 1720s, Bach revised the sixth sonata by excising the two published movements from BWV 830. He replaced the harpsichord solo by a lengthy Cantabile for violin and obbligato harpsichord:

1. Vivace, G major
2. Largo, E minor
3. Cantabile, G major
4. Adagio, B minor and G minor

The third movement is considered to be an arrangement of an aria from a lost secular cantata, probably dating from Bach's period in Cöthen. There is no longer any indication that the opening Vivace should be repeated in performance; the lack of a fast finale returning to the original key has been taken as an indication of the unfinished or intermediate status of this version.

The sonata attained its final form some time between 1729 and 1741 and survives in a copy made by Bach's pupil Johann Friedrich Agricola. Now with five movements and matching more closely the earlier five sonatas, it retained the first two movements (with some minor modifications, including "Vivace" changed to "Allegro") but had three newly composed movements after that: a dance-like harpsichord solo in E minor in binary form; an Adagio in B minor, modulating to D major; and a gigue-like final Allegro in G major.

== Musical structure ==
The slow movements contain some of Bach's most beautiful and profound essays in serious, sad, or lamenting affects.

— A History of Baroque Music, Buelow (2004, p. 523)

The first musical description of the sonatas for obbligato harpsichord and violin BWV 1014–1019 appeared in Spitta (1884). In the 1960s Hans Eppstein made a systematic analysis of all the sonatas for obbligato keyboard and melody instrument, including the six organ sonatas, BWV 525–530. He determined common features in their compositional forms; part of his aim was to investigate their possible origins as transcriptions of lost compositions for chamber ensemble. Because of the complex history of BWV 1019, with its five movements and two previous versions, Eppstein gives his analysis for the first five sonatas BWV 1014–1018, viewing the movements of the sixth sonata as hybrid forms. The movements of the three versions of BWV 1019 will be discussed separately in its own section below.

The five sonatas BWV 1014–1018 are all in four movements in the conventions of the sonata da chiesa, with a slow first movement, followed by a fast movement, then another slow movement before the final allegro, often having a joyful or witty dance-like character. Eppstein (1969) pointed out a uniform structure in the fast movements. They are all fugal in form but can be divided into two distinct and readily identifiable types:

- Tutti fugue. Contrary to Eppstein's choice of name, these do not start off with a "tutti" section: they commence with the fugue subject in one of the upper parts (violin or right hand of the harpsichord), accompanied by a non-thematic accompaniment in the bass, which can be a bare bass line or a figured bass. The fugue subject is then taken up by the other upper part and finally in the bass. These movements have countersubjects, solo episodes, fugal development sections and a ritornello at the close.
- Concerto allegro. These follow the model of the fast movements of the concertos of Antonio Vivaldi. Like dances, they have a binary form, i.e. are written in two sections which can be repeated (most often only the first section is repeated). All parts play together at the beginning and there are solo episodes; the subject and countersubject are in invertible counterpoint, so can be permuted between the parts.

In general the first fast movements of the sonatas are written as tutti fugues and the closing movements as concerto allegros. There are two exceptions: in the fifth sonata BWV 1018 in F minor, the first fast movement is a concerto allegro and the closing allegro is a tutti fugue; and in the third sonata BWV 1016 in E major both allegros are tutti fugues. Both fast movements are usually linked by the musical form of their subjects. Although the binary form of the concerto allegro is usually described as "dance-like", unlike other movements of this form discussed in detail by Little & Jenne (2001), no specific dance forms have been associated to individual movements.

The slow movements by contrast are united only by their diversity. The violin and keyboard play different roles and there are often more than two voices in the upper parts, which can divide in the keyboard part or have double stopping in the violin. Bach explored all possibilities in the slow movements: they can resemble movements from every variety of baroque musical genre, including concertos, chamber works, dance suites, cantatas or accompanied arias; and the textures in the keyboard and the violin were often new departures, quite distinct from previously known compositions.

Unlike the fast movements, there is no longer an equality between the two upper parts and the bass, which plays a continuo role. Sometimes the bass has its own theme, as in BWV 1014/1, where it produces a partial ostinato effect; in BWV 1014/3, BWV 1016/3 and BWV 1017/3, the bass line is a genuine ostinato.

The upper keyboard part can have an independent structure from the other voices: that happens in the broken chord semiquavers or triplets that give Bach's predetermined realisation of a figured bass in the slow movements of BWV 1017; and also in BWV 1016/1 where it is divided into three voices. In the accompanying keyboard ritornello of the first movement of the F minor sonata BWV 1018, the two parts in the upper keyboard and the bass line share the same material which is echoed imitatively between them; in the third movement of the same sonata, the filigree demisemiquaver scale figures in the right hand are responded to by demisemiquaver arpeggios in the left hand.

In a few exceptional movements the upper keyboard part is directly related to the violin part: in BWV 1015/3, the two upper parts play in strict canon over broken semiquaver chords in the bass; in BWV 1016/3 in trio sonata form, the two upper parts share the same material, with invertible counterpoint and imitation; in BWV 1014/3, the right hand part adds an imitative subordinate voice to the melody line in the violin, often accompanying in thirds. In BWV 1014/1 and BWV 1016/1, there are instances when the violin and upper keyboard respond to each other, with one borrowing the thematic material of the other. In these last two movements the violin and the upper keyboard are equally matched partners.

In the majority of slow movements, however, the role of the upper keyboard part is subordinate to that of the violin and—although composed with independent material—serves the function of providing an obbligato accompaniment.

=== No. 1 in B minor, BWV 1014 ===
1. Adagio in B minor
2. Allegro in B minor
3. Andante in D major
4. Allegro in B minor

=== No. 2 in A major, BWV 1015 ===
1. [Andante] in A major
2. Allegro in A major
3. Andante un poco in F♯ minor
4. Presto in A major

=== No. 3 in E major, BWV 1016 ===
1. Adagio in E major
2. Allegro in E major
3. Adagio ma non tanto in C♯ minor
4. Allegro in E major

=== No. 4 in C minor, BWV 1017 ===
1. Largo in C minor
2. Allegro in C minor
3. Adagio in E♭ major
4. Allegro in C minor

==== I. Largo ====
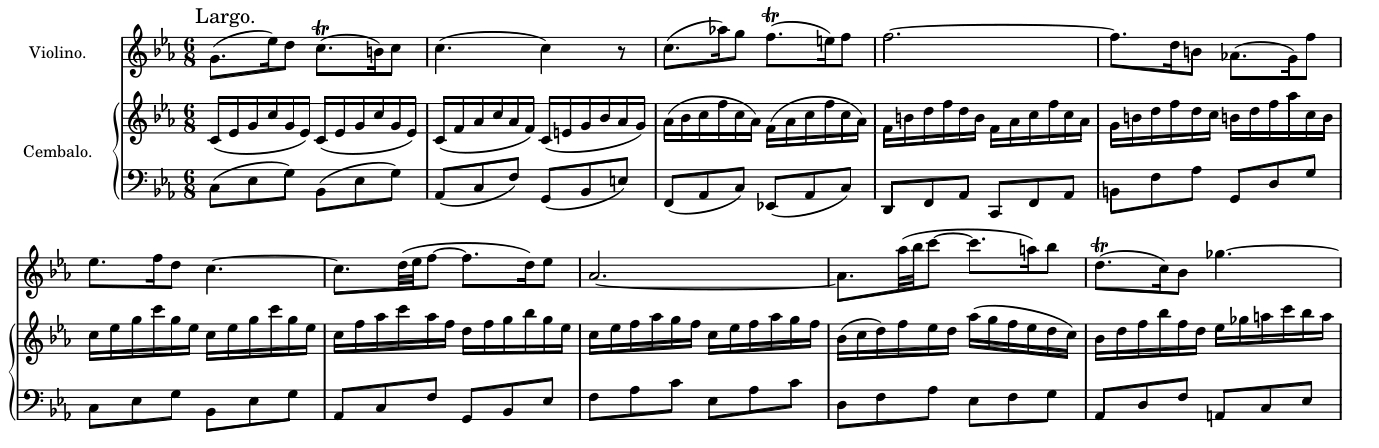

I. Largo BWV 1017

The opening Largo of BWV 1017 in 6/8 time is a Siciliano, a binary dance-form widely used in the early eighteenth century. In the minor key it was associated with a mood of melancholy or even pathos. The elegiac melodic line and ornamentation are entirely suited to the violin. As numerous commentators have pointed out, with its affecting anapaests, the compositional style and impassioned tone resemble those of the obbligato violin solo in the celebrated alto aria "Erbarme dich" from Bach's St Matthew Passion. The harpsichord supplies a continuo-like accompaniment. There are arpeggiated semiquaver figures in the harpsichord right hand, while the quavers in the left hand—with their French tenue slurs gradually descending in steps—provide a rhythmic pulse gently driving the movement forward, almost like an ostinato bass.

==== II. Allegro ====
II. Allegro BWV 1017

The second movement of BWV 1017 in common time is a "concerto allegro" according to Eppstein's classification. 109 bars long, Butt (2015) has described it as "a mammoth compendium of musical ideas all somehow integrated into one of the most intensive fugal movements Bach ever wrote." The movement is built on a ritornello which contains both a fugue subject and a countersubject. New material is also introduced in a brief two bar interlude a third of the way through the movement. The ritornello, or parts of it, recurs ten times in the movement, which it also concludes. The fugue subject is heard in C minor and G minor, and their relative major keys, E♭ major and B♭ major; further complexity is added by reprises starting in the middle of a bar. Musical material from the ritornello and interlude is developed extensively in the many intervening episodes.

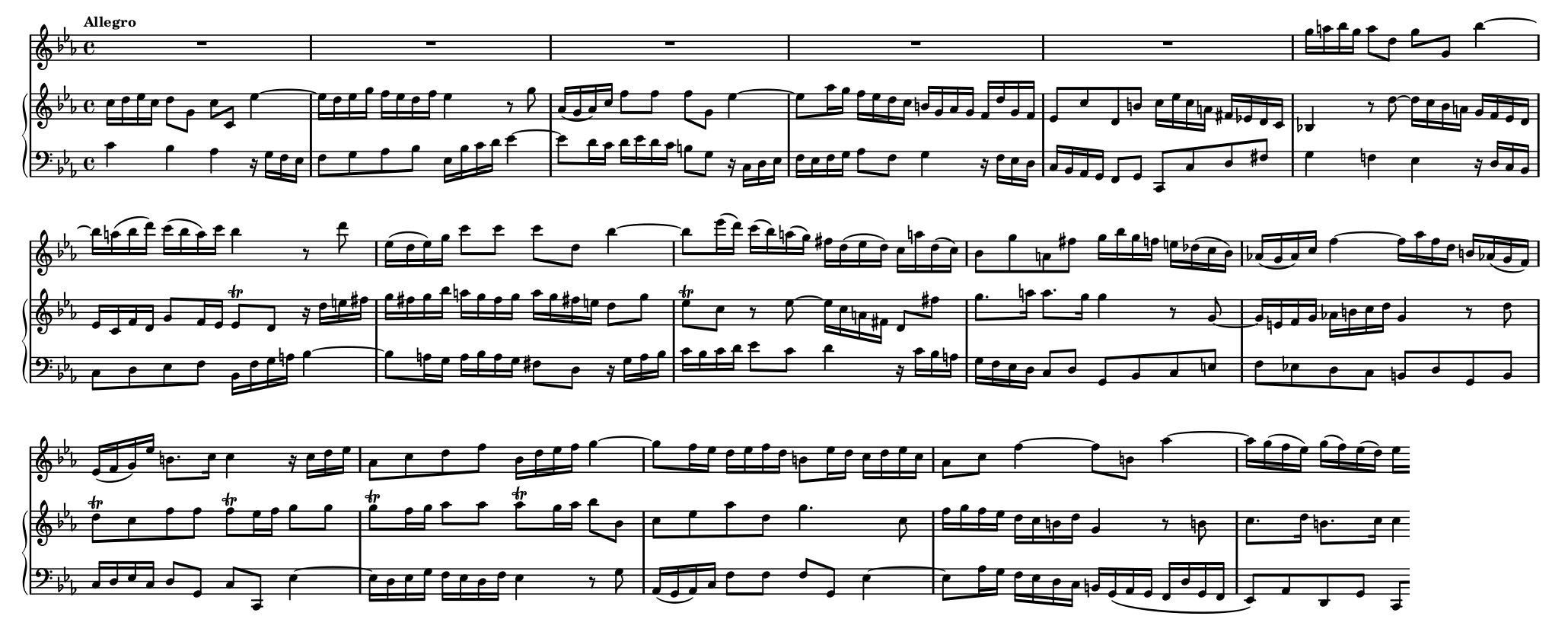

In the opening ritornello of 15 1/2 bars (see above) the fugue subject is first heard in the harpsichord, then the violin and finally in the bass line, when it is accompanied for two bars by the first statement of the countersubject—a rising sequence of repeated notes and trills—in the harpsichord. This is followed by the first episode of 10 1/2 bars in which motifs from the ritornello are developed between the upper parts in imitative responses and in parallel: rhythmic figures from the fugue subject are played in counterpoint to semiquaver passagework; and elsewhere the upper parts respond to each with trills. The ritornello then returns for seven bars with the fugue subject in the harpsichord. After the cadence, a pivotal two bar interlude introduces new motifs in all the parts:

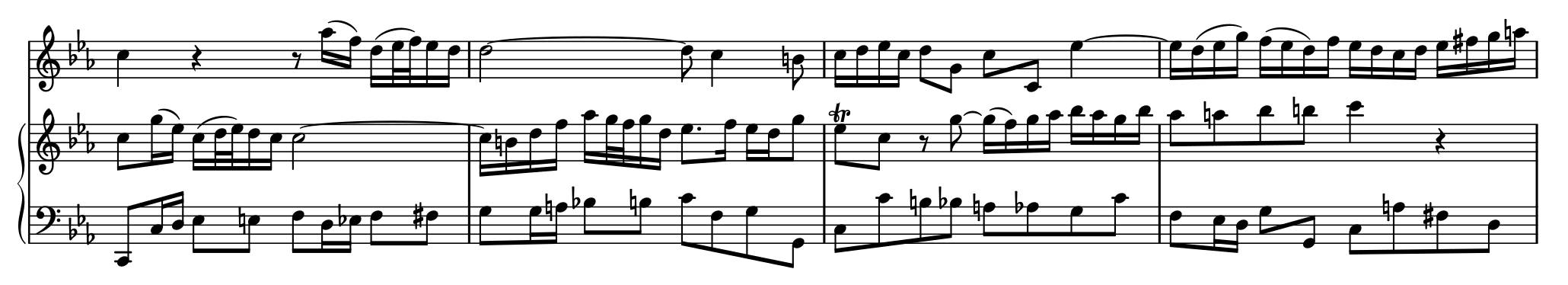

In the upper parts a tightly phrased semiquaver figure ornamented with a demisemiquaver dactyl is heard in the harpsichord, then in a response in the violin and finally in the harpsichord where it leads into a cadence. This is accompanied in the bass line by new rising figures made up of chromatic fourths. As Eppstein (1966) comments, although this new material is quite different from that of the ritornello, Bach subsequently relates it to the ritornello: in the two bar reprise of the fugue subject of the ritornello at the cadence, chromatic fourths are included first in the descending left hand of the harpsichord; and in the next bar they are then heard as a rising quaver motif in the right hand, forming a new countersubject. This four bar passage is immediately repeated with the upper parts exchanged.

For the remainder of the movement, Bach ingeniously permutes all the musical material at his disposal, with thematic passages from the ritornello interspersed with more elaborately developed variants of previous episodes. Between two bridging episodes, the ritornello theme returns in the violin but now starting in the middle of a bar. The fugue theme is heard again in the bass line accompanied by the countersubject in the violin; the fugue subject then passes to the violin starting mid-bar; and finally it is heard in the upper keyboard of the harpsichord. After a further extended concertino-like episode revisiting the trilling exchanges from the beginning of the movement, the ritornello theme returns mid-bar in the left hand of the harpsichord, accompanied by the countersubject in the right hand. With the upper parts exchanged, there is a repeat of the dactylic interlude along with its eight bar sequel. It is linked by a brief quasi-stretto section to a three bar cadenza-like passage over a pedal point, leading directly into the concluding eight bar ritornello, its opening marked by the rising chromatic fourth figure in the bass line.

==== III. Adagio ====
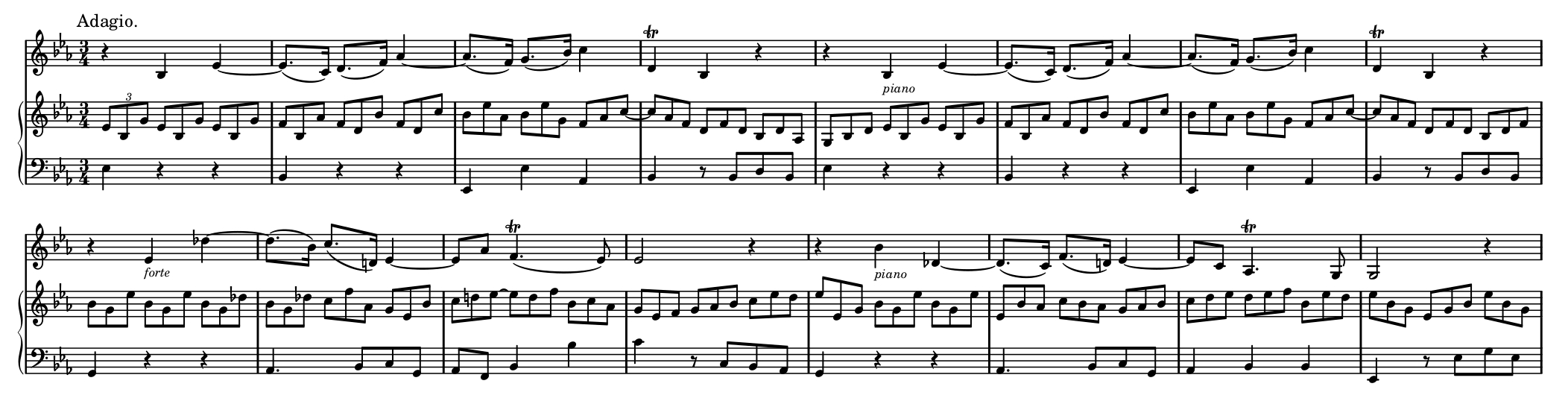

III. Adagio BWV 1017

In the Adagio in triple time, the violin plays the cantabile melodic line in dotted rhythms in its lower and middle registers as if an alto solo. At first declamatory in the forte passages, the piano responses are expressive but subdued. Bach's knowledge of the expressive qualities of the violin is shown in the opening phrases, written so they can be played on the G string, the lowest string on the violin, regarded as having a "noble" tone. As Stowell (1990) explains, citing the opening of BWV 1017/3 as an example, the G string's "energy and powerful voice make it a whole instrument in itself and the lower this voice is, the more opportunity it gives to expression to attain the sublime." Around the violin melody, in the same registers, the right hand keyboard part weaves a dreamy accompaniment of broken chords in triplets. Below them the bass part punctuates the melody with a fragmented continuo-like accompaniment in quavers and crotchets. As Ledbetter (2002) comments, the complex and contrasting juxtaposition of rhythms, if played as annotated, has a magical effect. In the course of the movement there are six forte phrases of increasing complexity and length in the violin part each followed by a proportionate piano response. In the concluding four bar coda, the violin and harpsichord play semiquaver figures imitatively as the tonality modulates to G major, leading into the final Allegro. Eppstein (1966) describes the mood of the movement as "verinnerlichte und vergeistigte"—inward-looking and spiritual.

==== IV. Allegro ====
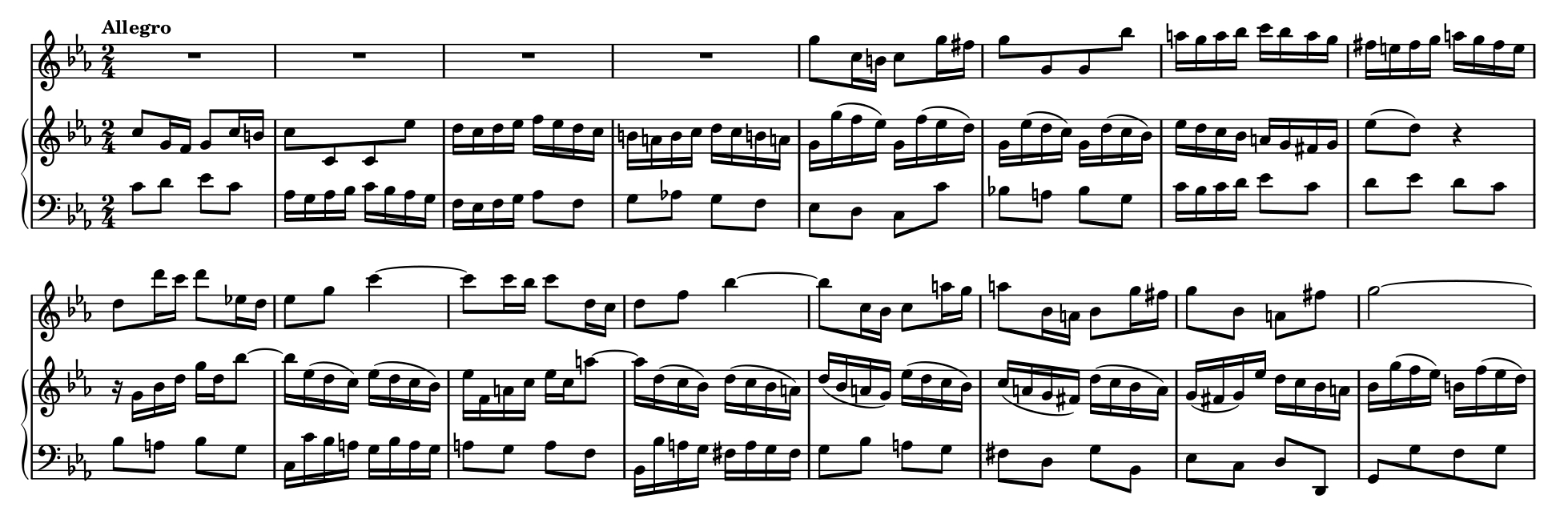

IV. Allegro BWV 1017

The final Allegro of BWV 1017 is a spirited dance-like "tutti fugue" in binary form. Like the last movements of BWV 1014 and the first organ sonata BWV 525, it follows the same plan as the fugal gigues in Bach's keyboard partitas, BWV 825–830; namely in the second part of the binary movement, the fugue subject is inverted.

Following Eppstein (1966), the structure of the first part can be described as follows. The fugue subject is first played by the harpsichord in the first four bars. In the next four bars it is taken up by the violin while the harpsichord plays the countersubject. Before the bass plays the theme, there are two linked interludes. The main one is four bars long with the violin playing material based on the fugue subject, while the harpsichord plays characteristic two bar motifs which Eppstein describes as "fountain-like". These are made up of semiquaver triad motifs leaping upwards before descending in the semiquaver figures of the countersubject. The second interlude of three bars has both parts playing these semiquaver figures in parallel. The material from both episodes is then ingeniously developed. Eventually a four bar passage of semiquaver scales in the harpsichord part leads to a cadence and then a reprise of the second interlude, before a fourth and final statement of the subject and countersubject. The first part then concludes with an emphatic rendition of the two interludes in the violin and harpsichord.

The second part of BWV 1017/4 starts as follows:

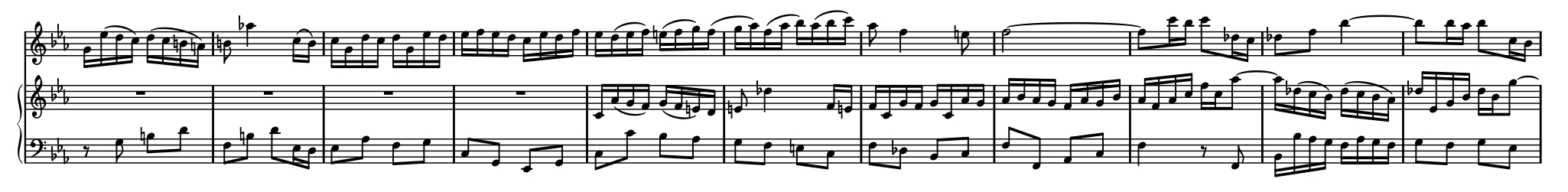

Although parallel to the first part, the second part is not a straightforward inversion (it is ten bars longer with 64 bars instead of 54). Only the fugue subject and countersubject are inverted. Both are also transformed in other ways: the first by adding intermediate notes and removing some repeated notes which change its rhythmic character to a more continuous melodic line; and diminution is introduced in the countersubject, now playfully scored in syncopated groups of three semiquavers instead of four (see the 5th bar above).

The second part starts with the (modified) fugue subject in the violin; followed by the subject in the harpsichord and the countersubject in the violin. As in the first part, there is a reprise of both interludes followed by a statement of the fugue subject/countersubject in the bass line/harpsichord, but now truncated from four bars to three. This is followed by an episode developing the material of the interlude, followed by the truncated fugue subject/countersubject in the harpsichord/violin. There is then a reprise of the episode with cascading semiquaver scales which leads this time into a fifth statement of the truncated fugue subject/countersubject in the violin/harpsichord. It is followed by the second interlude and a sixth and last statement of the truncated fugue subject/countersubject in the bass line/violin. This is immediately juxtaposed with the return of the original (uninverted 4 bar) fugue subject and countersubject in the harpsichord and violin, leading into a concluding restatement of the rhythmic eight bar interlude.

=== No. 5 in F minor, BWV 1018 ===
1. [Largo] in F minor
2. Allegro in F minor
3. Adagio in C minor
4. Vivace in F minor

=== No. 6 in G major, BWV 1019 ===
The three stages in the evolution of Sonata No. 6 in G major are described in great detail in the section "Origins and compositional history",

1. Allegro in G major
2. Largo in E minor
3. Allegro (harpsichord solo) in E minor
4. Adagio in B minor
5. Allegro in G major

==== I. Allegro ====
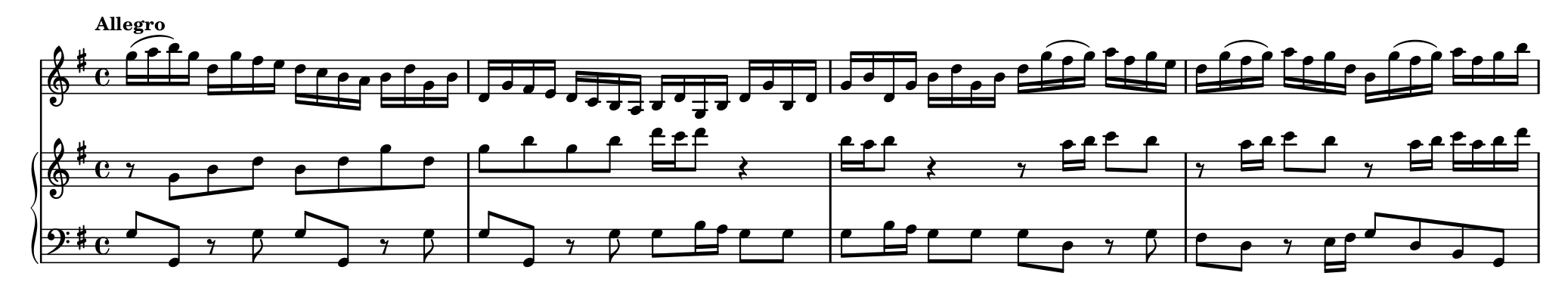

I. Allegro BWV 1019

The opening movement is a concerto allegro in G major and common time. This already sets the sonata apart from the previous sonatas, which like the sonatas da chiesa of Corelli start with slow movements: BWV 1019, like the instrumental concertos of Bach, begins with a fast movement. Symmetrical in structure and written in strict da capo form, its opening 21 bar ritornello is scored as a tutti section for all three parts. The toccata-like semiquaver theme descending in the violin is matched by a rising quaver countersubject in the upper keyboard, with a rhythmic quasi-continuo in the bass line. The upper voices are written in invertible counterpoint in the ritornello, with the musical material alternating every two or four bars. The semiquavers continue unabated like a moto perpetuo throughout the ritornello, passing from one voice to another. After the first eight bars, when the main theme is heard twice, there is an eight-bar interlude when the violin and upper keyboard play in counterpoint, alternating between semiquaver motifs derived from the main theme and a syncopated countersubject.

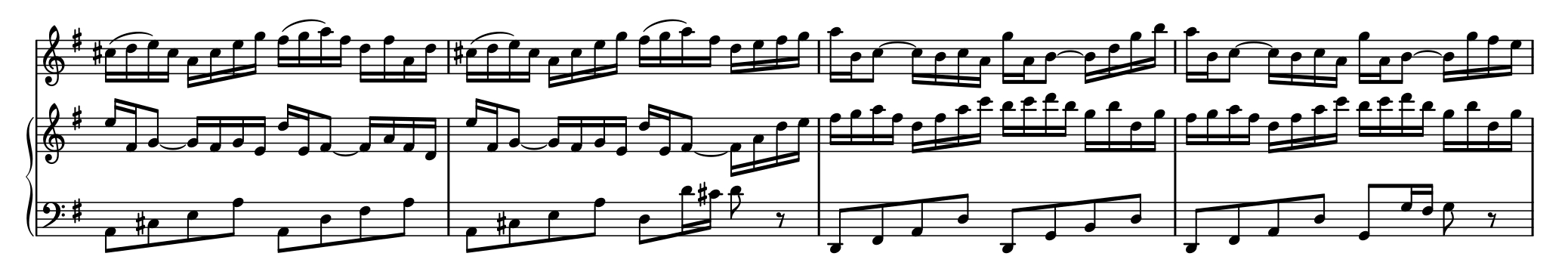

For the remainder of the ritornello the semiquavers pass to the bass, with an arpeggiated version of the motifs for two bars which leads into a short coda and a cadence marking the beginning of the middle section of the movement. The arpeggios in the left hand of the harpsichord are accompanied by an adaptation of the syncopated countersubject in the right hand and fragmented quaver responses in the violin.

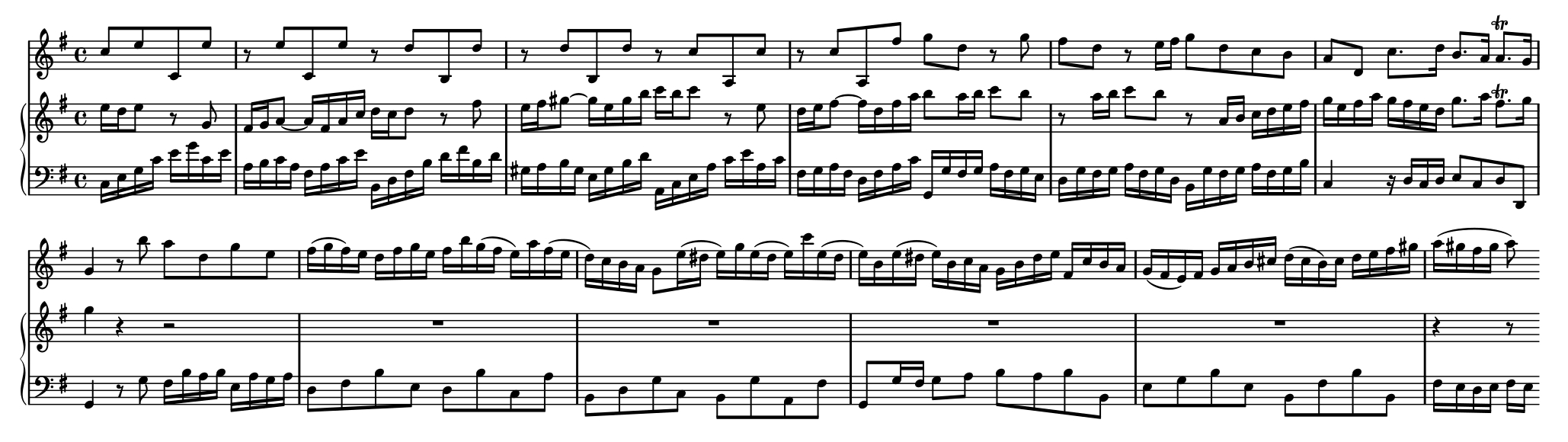

The middle portion of the movement lasts 48 bars and is also symmetrical in structure, made up of two fugal sections and a central episode in which the non-thematic material in the ritornello is heard again. The new fugue subject is five bars long and is first heard in the violin with a simple figured bass accompaniment in quavers. The subject is then taken up in the upper keyboard, while the violin part plays figures drawn from the continuo line, including characteristic quaver leaps in sixths. A two bar bridging passages with semiquaver scales in parallel thirds in the upper parts leads into the statement of the fugue subject in the bass line, while the upper parts develop the accompanying motifs in syncopated exchanges. At the close semiquaver scales in the bass merge into the semiquaver arpeggios from the second interlude in the ritornello, which is reprised in full with the upper parts exchanged. It is followed by a reprise of the first interlude, which leads directly into a repetition of the entire fugal section with the upper parts exchanged. This time at the close the semiquaver scales in the bass line are joined by parallel scales in the upper parts for the final cadence that heralds the concluding rendition of the ritornello.

==== II. Largo ====
The excellent Bach possessed this [skill] in the highest degree. When he played, the soloist had to shine. By his exceedingly adroit accompaniment he gave the upper part life when it had none. He knew how to imitate the upper part so cleverly, with either the right hand or the left, and how to introduce an unexpected counter-theme against it, that the listener would have sworn that everything had been carefully written out ... his accompaniment was always like a concertante part ... added as a companion to the upper voice so that at the appropriate time the upper voice would shine. This right was even given at times to the bass, without slighting the upper voice. Suffice it to say that anybody who missed his playing missed a great deal.

— Comments on Bach's continuo playing, Johann Friedrich Daube, Treatise on the figured bass, 1756.

The second movement of BWV 1019 is a Largo in E minor in triple time. A brief movement of only 21 bars in length, it has the tonal purpose of mediating between the keys of G major and E minor of the first and third movements. With the opening Allegro, it is one of the two movements present in every version of the sonata. The scoring, however, evolved as Bach added a third "middle" voice to the harpsichord part in later versions. This change results in the harpsichord part itself evolving within the piece as the middle voice enters: the texture of the accompaniment is gradually transformed from a simple continuo to a fully realised three-part accompaniment.

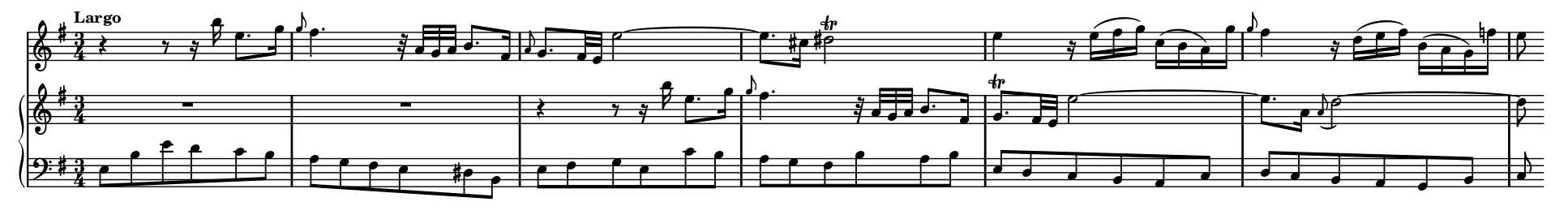

II. Largo BWV 1019

The Largo begins with a simple walking bass in the harpsichord which for the first three bars is annotated as a figured bass. The violin enters with the theme which is imitated in canon by the upper harpsichord part two bars later. The second complete statement of the theme is in the harpsichord with the canon in the violin, which passes into its "noble" lower register playing an expressive descending sequence of long sustained notes in suspension. It is during this passage that the third middle voice is first heard in the harpsichord playing semiquavers which dovetail with those of the main theme in the harpsichord, the combination of parts developing into a semiquaver accompaniment.

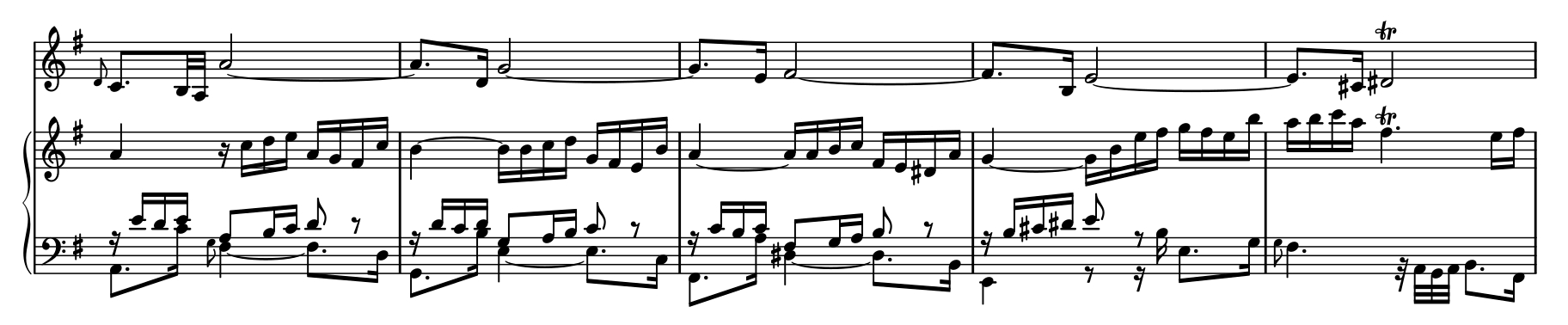

As this episode ends, the entire theme is heard once again but now in the bass line (in a slightly adapted form) with the violin in canon two bars later, resuming its descending sustained notes until the final cadence.

==== III. Allegro ====
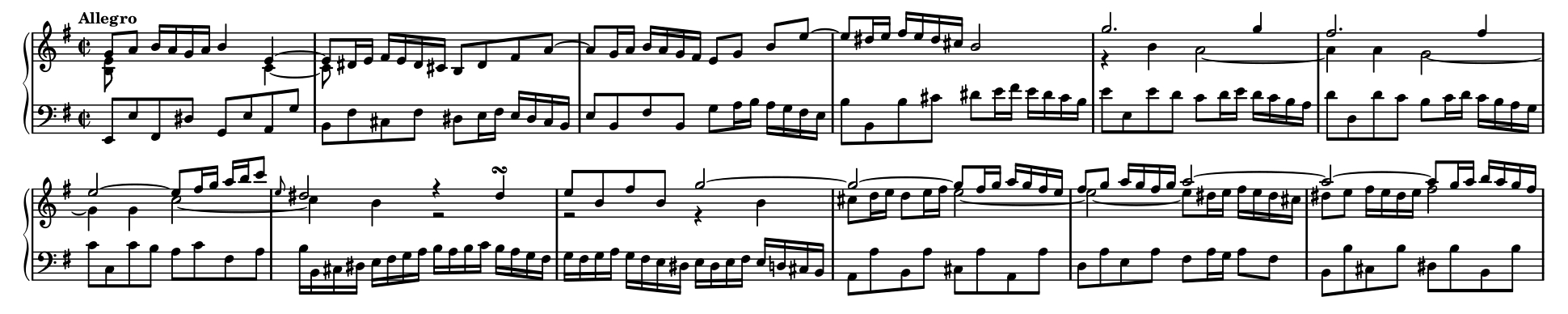

III. Allegro BWV 1019

In E minor and 2/2 time, the third and central movement of BWV 1019 is an allegro in binary dance-form for solo harpsichord. Unlike the movements it replaced—the corrente and tempo di gavotta from the sixth keyboard partita, BWV 830—it cannot be identified with a particular dance. Although perhaps less brilliant than the sixth partita, the compositional style is comparable to Bach's keyboard writing of the 1730s that can be found in the binary preludes in Book 2 of the Well Tempered Clavier or some movements from the Overture in the French Style, BWV 831: the final piece in BWV 831 was also an unspecified dance movement with a similar function of showcasing the harpsichord. BWV 1019/3 is composed as a large scale movement with two and sometimes three voices. The semiquavers in the rhythmic theme are developed in extended passagework in both the upper and lower keyboard; after a development section and a recapitulation of the theme an octave lower, the second part concludes with semiquavers in parallel and contrary motion in both hands.

==== IV. Adagio ====
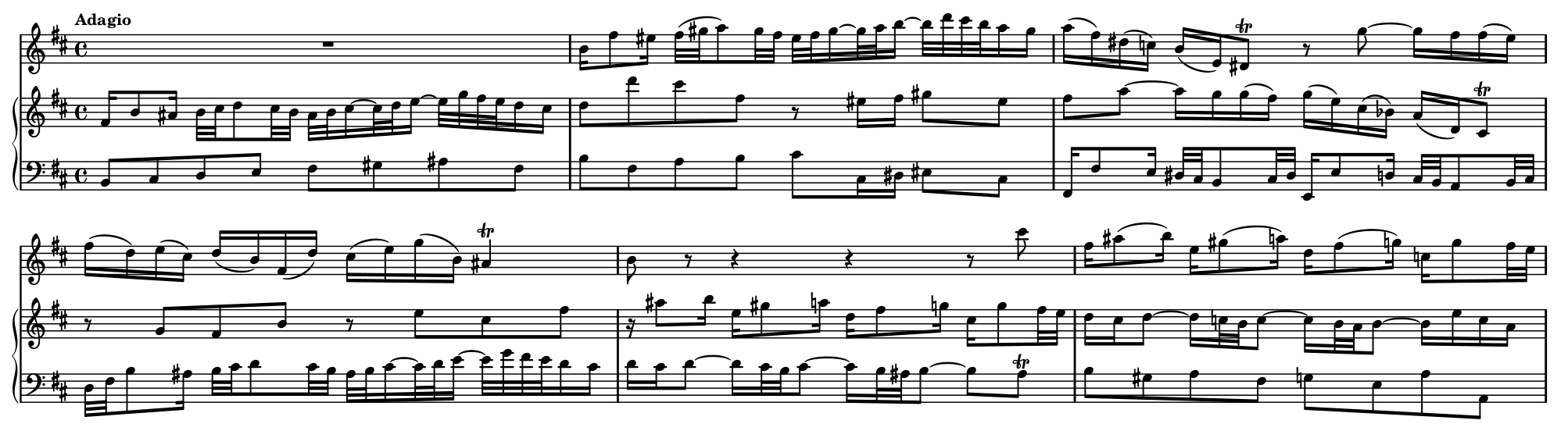

IV. Adagio BWV 1019

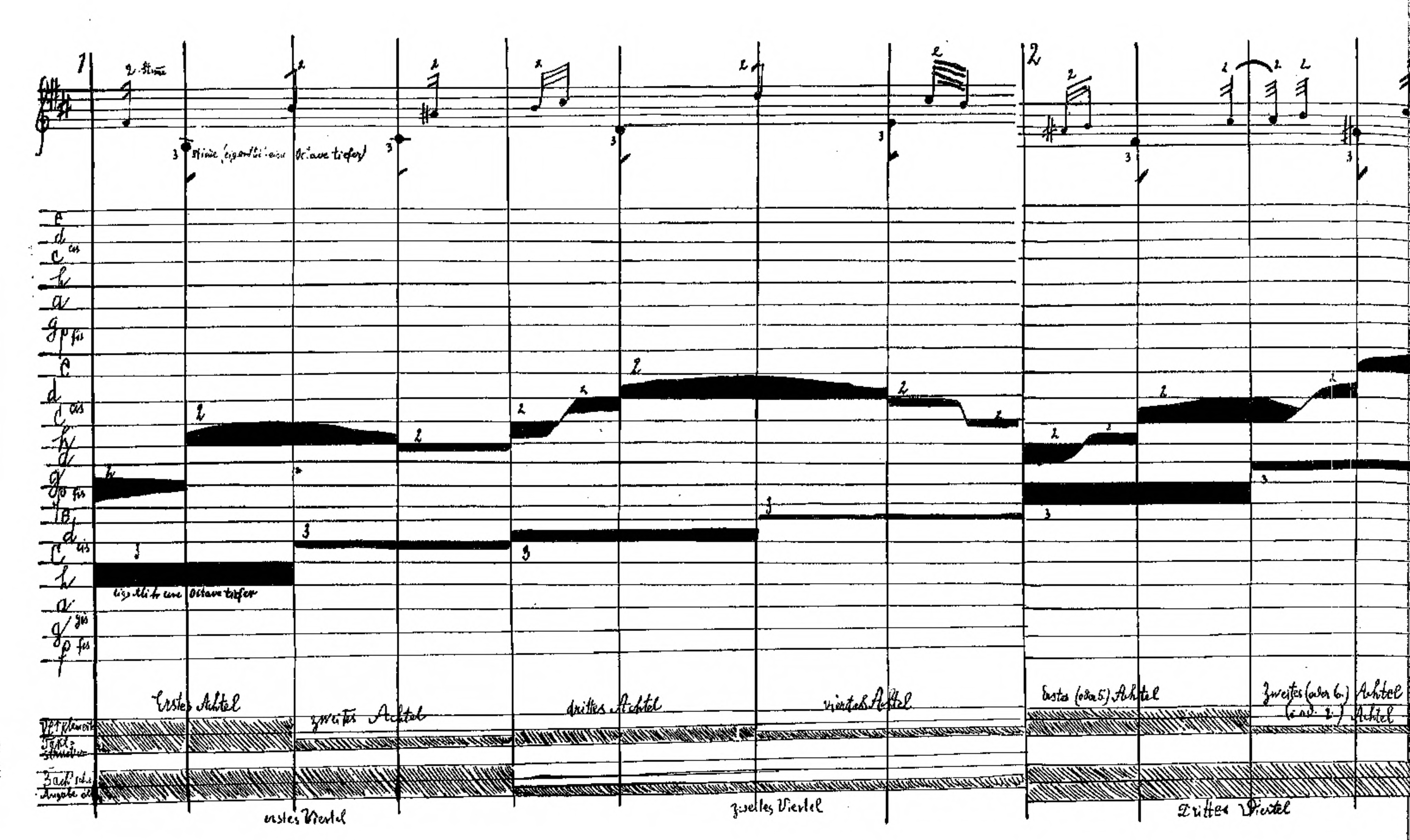
Part of a pictorial representation of the opening of BWV 1019/4 from the 1921–1922 Bauhaus lectures of the Swiss artist Paul Klee

The fourth movement is an Adagio in B minor in common time. Of 21 bars in length, its tonal function is to mediate between the keys of the central and final movements (E minor and G major). The contrapuntal material of themes and counter-themes is shared and exchanged between all three parts; the long phrases in the main theme provide a soaring melody for the violin. The first version of the sonata also had an Adagio in B minor with a similar function but, as Richard Jones comments, the later replacement is "more elaborate and of greater expressive weight and substance." Asmus (1982) gives a detailed analysis of the musical structure of the Adagio, which alternates between two contrasting elements, the interplay between the two underlying the architecture of the movement. The first "arc-shaped" element is the fugue theme—florid, melodic, rhythmically complex and based around the tonic key. It is heard in the first bar in the harpsichord over a rising scale of quavers in the bass. An inverted version of the opening motif appears in the bass line in the third bar as the two upper voices play descending figures semiquaver couplets, which not only complete the melodic line of the fugue theme in the violin part but also provide a counter-theme. The second "rectilinear" element—more severe, chromatic and modulating—is first heard with its own counter-theme in the fifth bar. It is formed of a chain of motifs descending in crotchets, with syncopated rhythms related to those of the fugue theme. Time-wise the first element accounts for the majority of the movement, but the second element governs its tonal structure. Halfway through the movement in bar 11 the tonality reaches the relative major key of D major, but only fleetingly. The melody of the fugue subject and a variant of its completion return in the violin. After two bars of the chromatic syncopated material, the motifs of the fugue subject, broken up between all three voices, lead up to two cadences in F♯ minor. The second element returns in the final two bar coda as the music modulates to the closing cadence in D major, in anticipation of the fifth movement in G major.

==== V. Allegro ====
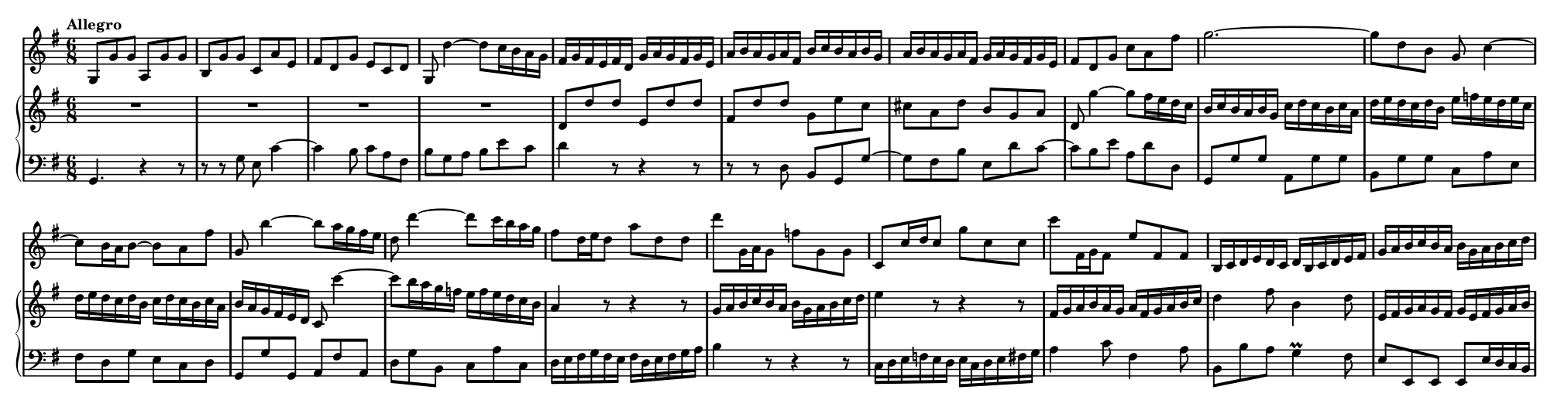

V. Allegro BWV 1019

The fifth and final movement of BWV 1019 is a concertante, gigue-like Allegro in G major and 6/8 time. Written for three voices in A–B–A da capo form, it is a hybrid movement, combining features from the tutti fugue and the concerto allegro. The energetic quaver theme in the fugal ritornello section is made up of repeated notes; the semiquaver counter-theme is also made up of repeated notes. Schweitzer and subsequent commentators have pointed out—without drawing any definite conclusions beyond the practise of self-borrowing—that the subject, countersubject and other motifs in the ritornello have strong affinities with the aria for soprano and continuo Phoebus eilt mit schnellen Pferden ("Phoebus speeds with swifty steeds") from the secular Wedding Cantata Weichet nur, betrübte Schatten, BWV 202 dating from Bach's period in Weimar. Jones (2007) notes that probably in the original aria the quaver figures musically represented the trotting of horses and the semiquavers their swiftness.

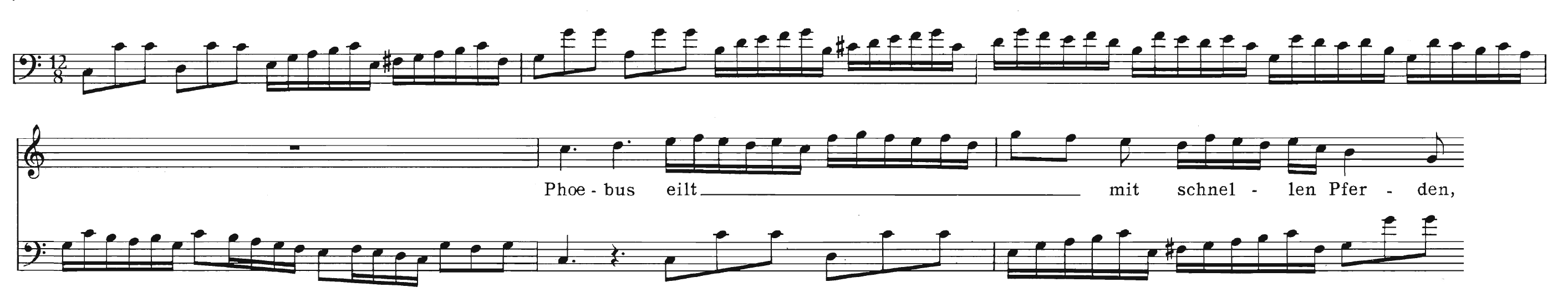

Whatever its origins, the conception of the newly composed Allegro matches that of the five other fugal last movements as well as the symmetry of the opening Allegro. The opening ritornello section is 30 bars long. After the statement of the three-bar fugue subject in the violin, it is taken up in the upper harpsichord part with the semiquaver counter subject in the violin. It is then heard in the bass with the counter-theme in the upper harpsichord. At bar 14 the fugue develops with an inverted version of the opening motif in the violin in counterpoint with semiquaver figures in the left hand of the harpsichord with responses in the right hand.

At the cadence marking the end of the ritornello (section A), the middle 58-bar "development" section B begins with a new highly ornamented one-bar theme in the harpsichord, consisting of declamatory repeated notes answered by a trill. It is echoed a bar later in the violin with the harpsichord playing in parallel thirds.

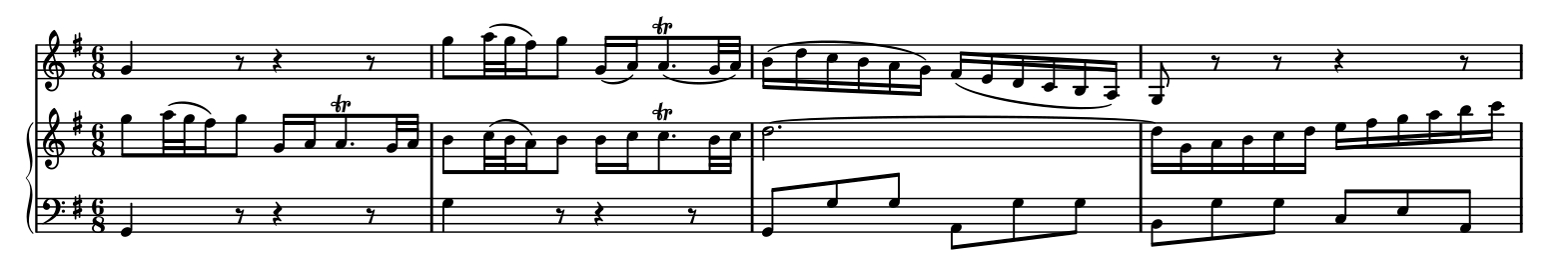

The new theme has the effect of an interjection —a kind of caesura—temporarily halting the flow of semiquavers, which resumes immediately afterwards with cascading scales over the fugue subject in the bass line. After a reprise with the parts inverted between violin and harpsichord, the middle section continues with joyful dance-like material drawn from the ritornello in half-bar exchanges between the violin and upper harpsichord before a cadence in E minor. The eight bar opening segment of section B is then reprised with the parts inverted followed by another episode of one-bar exchanges of motifs from the ritornello between all three parts until the music comes to a halt with a cadence in B minor. It resumes as a fugue on the counter-subject of the ritornello but the flow of the counter-theme is interrupted four times by half-bar interjections of the B theme.

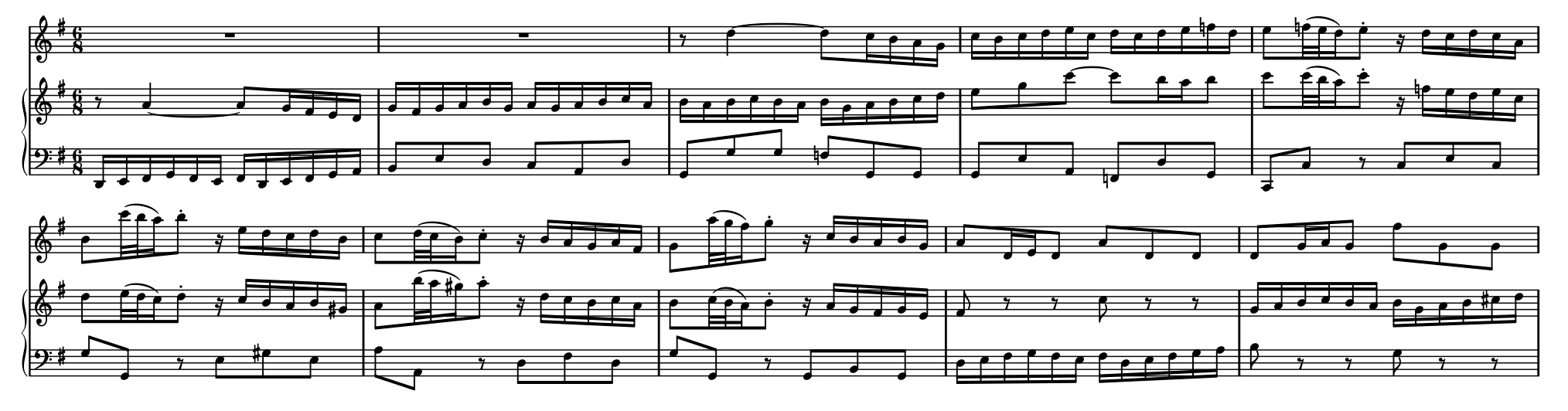

As Watchorn remarks, these momentary interruptions are similar in effect to those in the last movement of the fourth Brandenburg Concerto BWV 1049. After further contrapuntal exchanges between all three parts the music draws to a second halt with a cadence in B minor. It then resumes with a complete recapitulation of the ritornello back in G major.

== Reception and legacy ==
=== German-speaking countries ===
In the period 1700–1750, the trio sonata form became a sine qua non in the musical world. It incorporated all the ideals of harmony, melody and counterpoint espoused by theorists such as Mattheson, Scheibe and Quantz. In his treatise Der Vollkommene Capellmeister of 1739, Mattheson wrote that, ... es müssen hier alle drey Stimmen, jede für sich, eine feine Melodie führen; und doch dabey, soviel möglich, den Dreyklang behaupten, als obes nur zufälliger Weise geschehe: "Here each of the three voices must separately provide a fine melodic line; yet all the while together they must sustain as much as possible the three part harmony, as if by serendipity." Amongst all composers of that era, Bach was the one who raised the trio sonata form to its highest degree of perfection. In 1774 Bach's son Carl Philipp Emanuel commented that even after fifty years his father's compositions of this kind still sounded very good and that the lyricism of several of his adagios had never been surpassed. This continued veneration for these particular works even long after his death probably sprang not only from the fact that the form matched Bach's own compositional ideals—that all voices should "work wondrously with each other" (wundersam durcheinander arbeiten)—but also from the succeeding generation's preference for "sensitive" melodies. Perhaps even more influential was Bach's elevation of the harpsichord from a continuo instrument to a prominent obbligato instrument, on equal terms with the solo instrument, whilst also providing the bass line. As Stowell (1992) comments, with his sonatas for violin and obbligato keyboard "Bach triggered off the gradual demise of the sonata for violin and continuo," even though it lived on in a few eighteenth century volin sonatas, for example those of Bach's German contemporaries Johann Adam Birkenstock, Johann David Heinichen, Gottfried Kirchhoff and Johann Georg Pisendel.

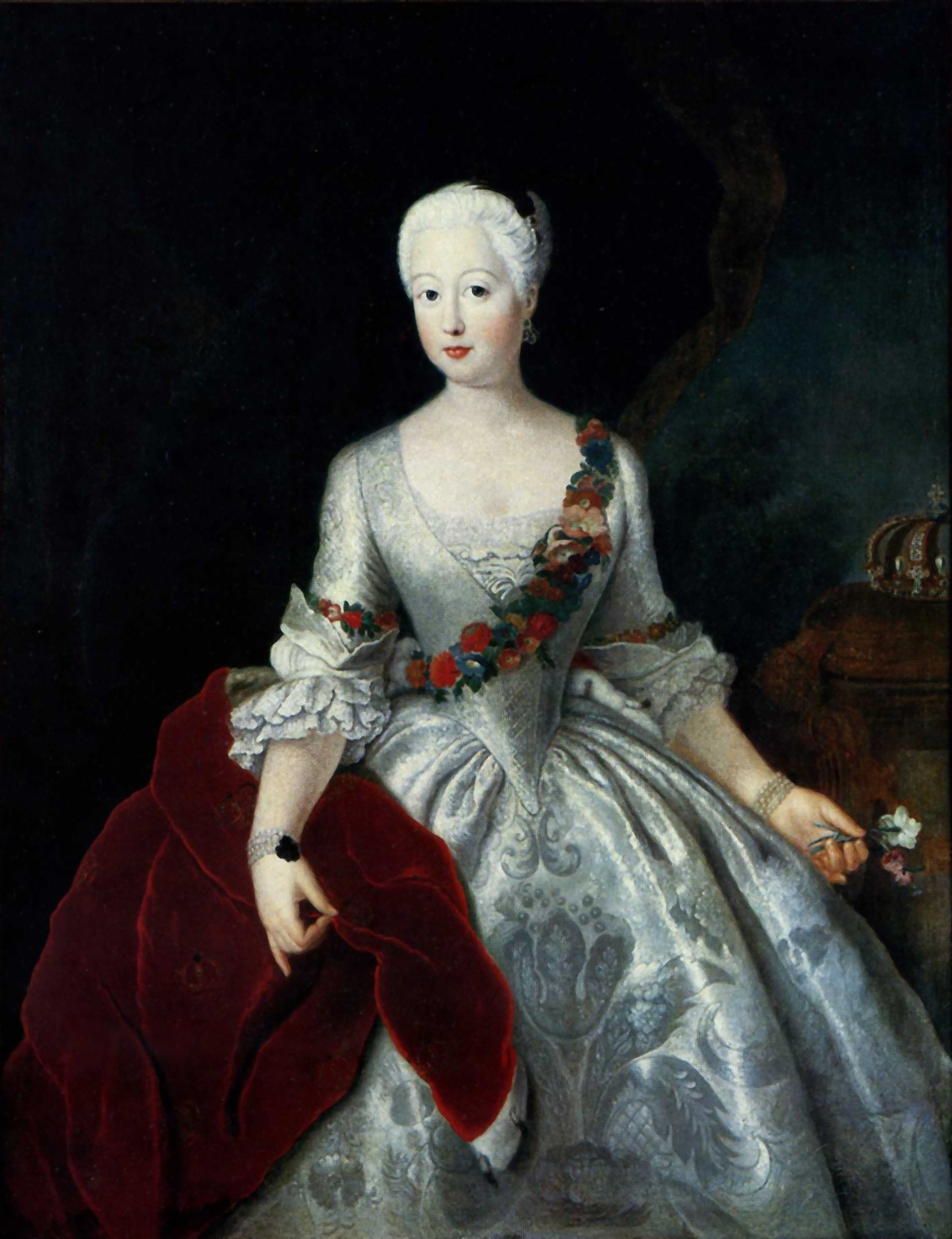
Princess Anna Amalie

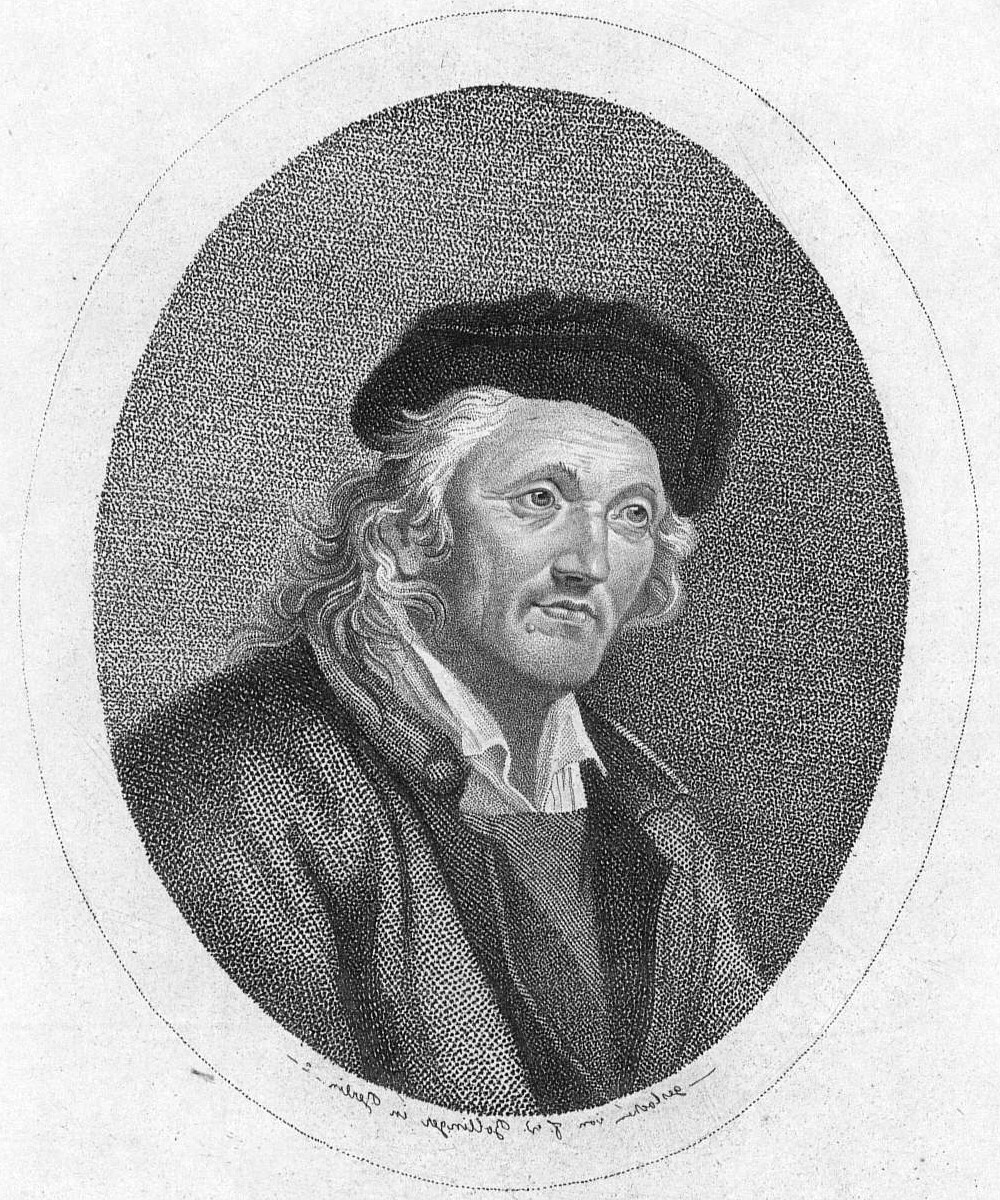
Johann Kirnberger

In the second half of the eighteenth century in Germany, the sonatas were transmitted through hand copies made by Bach's pupils and circle from Leipzig. During that period Berlin rose to prominence as the centre of musical activities in Germany. The court of Frederick the Great, where Carl Philipp Emanuel Bach was appointed harpsichordist in 1740, had a number of exceptional violinists, including Johann Gottlieb Graun, the violin teacher of Wilhelm Friedemann Bach, and Franz Benda, another of Graun's pupils. In Berlin Princess Anna Amalia, the sister of Frederick the Great, was a keen amateur keyboard player and from 1758 had Bach's pupil Johann Kirnberger as her music teacher: since 1751 he had been employed as another of Frederick's court violinists. Anna Amalia's music library—the Amalienbibliothek, now incorporated in the Berlin State Library—contained a large collection of Bach manuscripts, including a hand copy of the sonatas. Many musical compositions from her collection were transmitted to Vienna by Baron van Swieten, the Austrian ambassador to Berlin: starting in the 1770s, van Swieten ran his only weekly salon in Vienna devoted to the music of Bach. Bach's music was also performed in Berlin outside the royal court. The family of Daniel Itzig, banker to Frederick the Great and his father, provided a cultural milieu for musical connoisseurs: four of his daughters, Sara, Zippora, Fanny and Bella (maternal grandmother of Felix Mendelssohn), were all keyboard players.

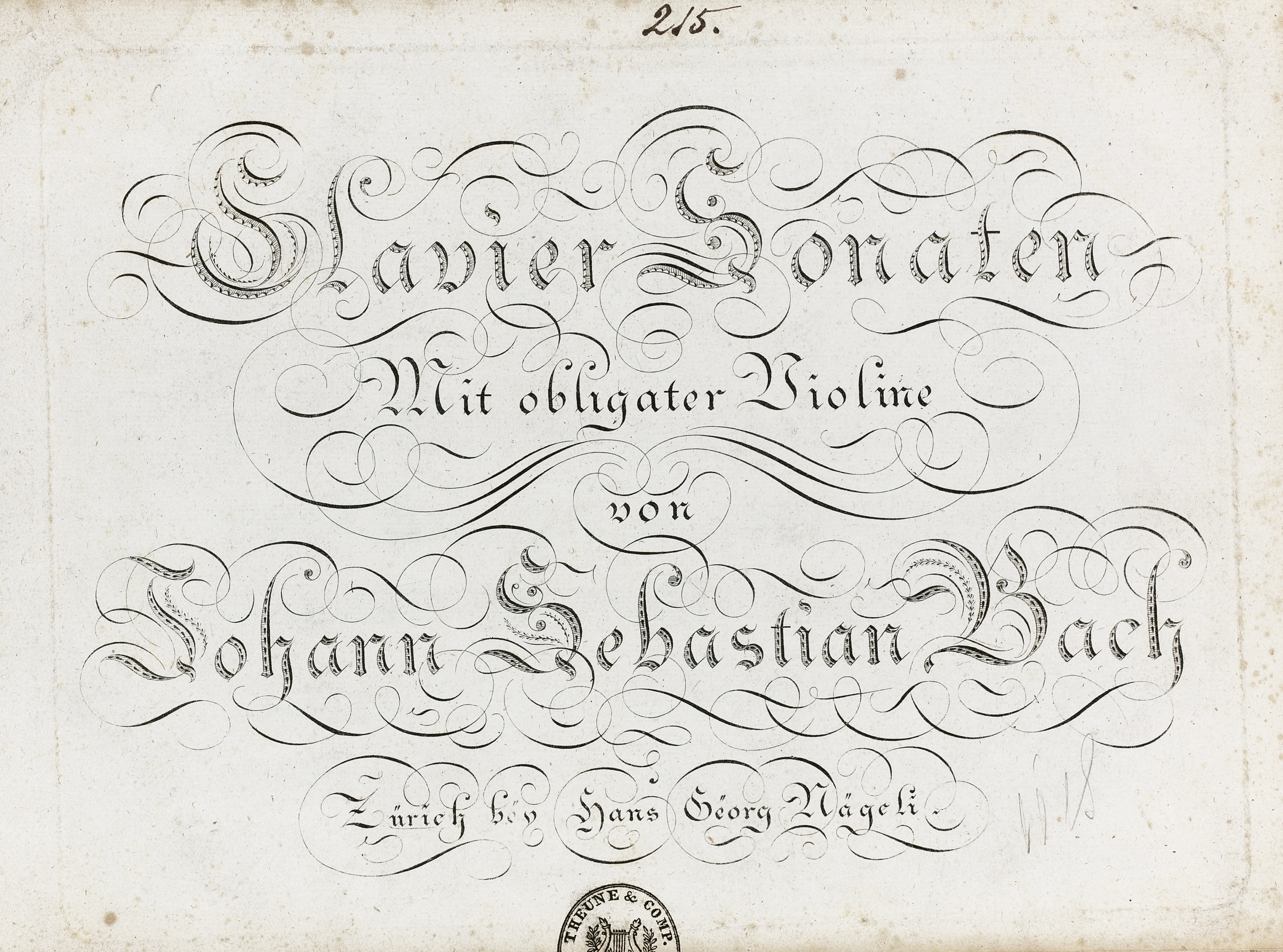
Title page of first printed edition of the sonatas published by the Swiss musicologist Hans Georg Nägeli in Zürich in the early 1800s

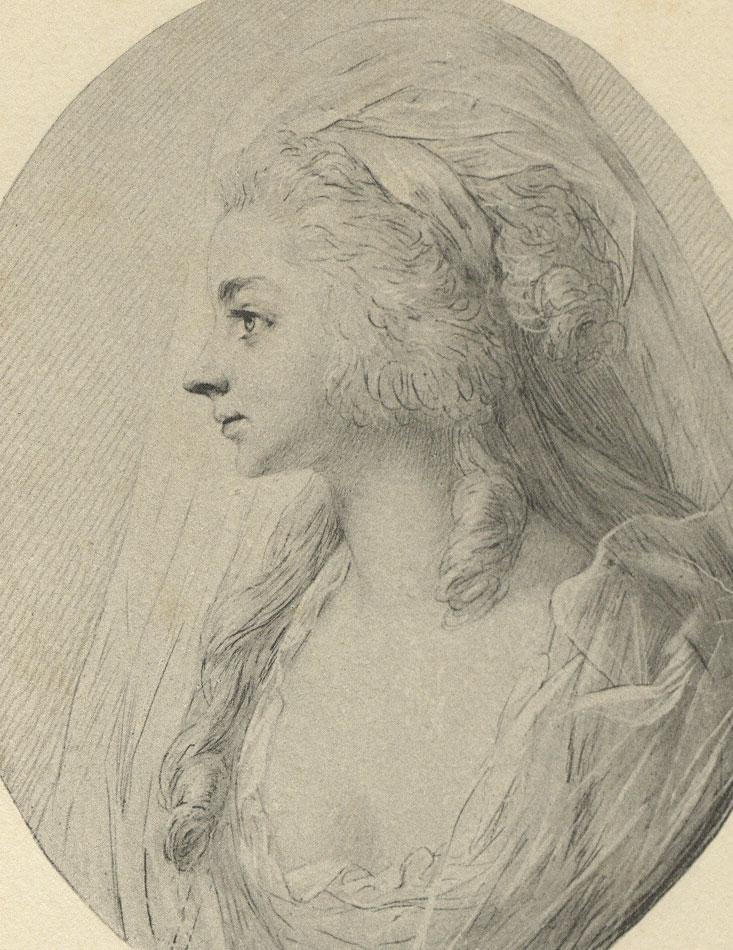
Portrait of Sara Levy by Anton Graff, 1786

Sara was the most gifted harpsichordist in the Itzig family, of professional standard. When Wilhelm Friedemann Bach moved to Berlin from Dresden, she took lessons from him and provided him with some financial support in his old age. Through Wilhelm Friedemann and Carl Philipp Emanuel, she acquired a collection of hand copies of Bach manuscripts, including copies of the first and third sonatas (BWV 1014 and BWV 1016). After her marriage to the banker Samuel Salomon Levy in 1784, she ran a weekly musical salon in their residence on the Museuminsel. Sara herself performed in public, including performances at the Sing-Akademie zu Berlin, from its foundation in 1791 until her retirement in 1810. The collections of Bachiana of Sara Levy and C.P.E. Bach became part of the Sing-Akademie's library, now held in the Berlin State Library.

The first printed score only appeared in the early nineteenth century. It was published in the early 1800s in Zürich by the Swiss musicologist Hans Georg Nägeli. The son of a musically inclined Protestant pastor in Wetzikon, Nägeli showed precocious musical skills. In 1790 he moved to Zürich where he took lessons with the Swiss pianist Johann David Brünings, who introduced him to the music of Bach. A year later he set up a music shop and in 1794 a publishing house. Corresponding with Bach's publisher Bernhard Christoph Breitkopf and the widow of C.P.E. Bach, he was able to acquire Bach manuscripts, including that of the Mass in B minor, which he eventually published. His Bach publications started with The Well-Tempered Clavier in 1801 and The Art of Fugue in 1802. His interests later turned to pedagogy and singing: in Zürich he set up an institute similar to the Sing-Akademie zu Berlin of Carl Friedrich Christian Fasch.

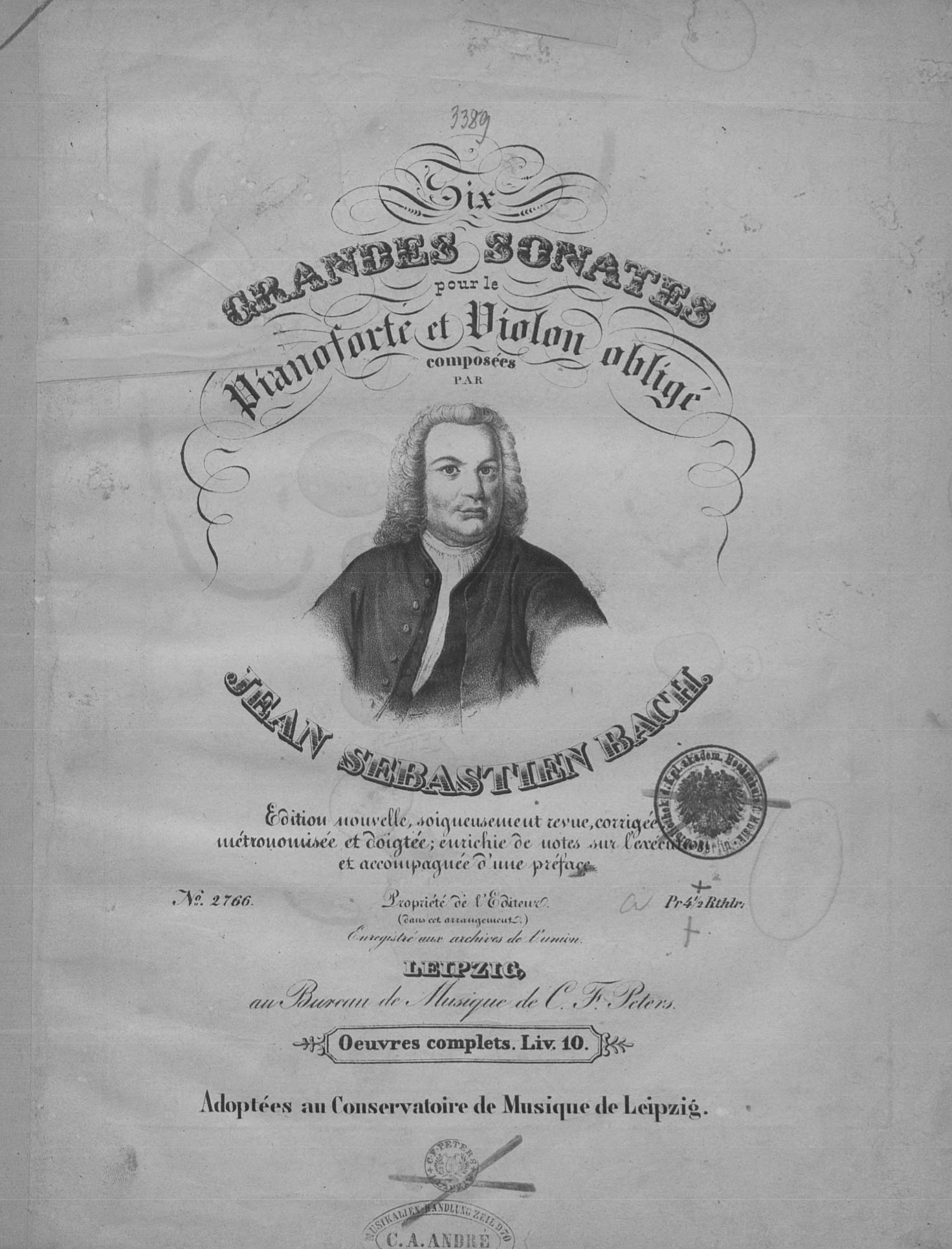
1841 Peters edition

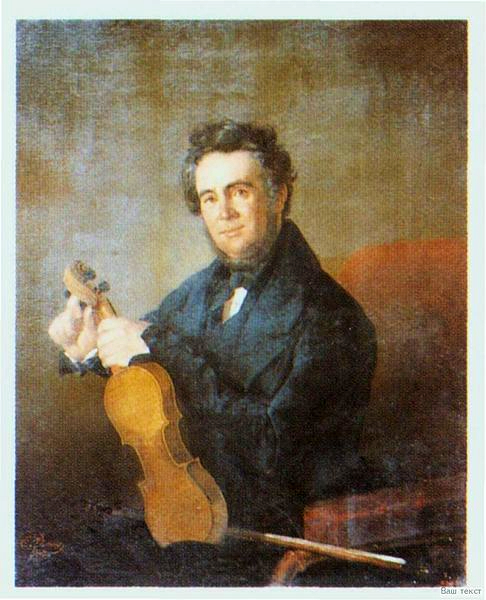
Karol Lipiński

In the early nineteenth century the virtuosity of the violinist Niccolò Paganini heralded a new generation of violinists. The Polish violinist Karol Lipiński, trained with Paganini and toured all the main cities in Europe before eventually settling in Dresden. In 1841, as part of a complete edition of Bach's works by the Leipzig publisher C.F. Peters, he prepared a new performing edition of BWV 1014–1019 in collaboration with the pianist Carl Czerny. It had the title Six grandes sonates pour piano et violon obligé. For the edition, Moritz Hauptmann corrected errors in Nägeli's version by going back to original manuscripts; and Lipinski decided upon bowing and other performing details by playing through the sonatas with the organist August Alexander Klengel. Gottfried Wilhelm Fink, the editor of the Allgemeine musikalische Zeitung, commented that "die Angabe der Bezeichnungen von einem Manne kommt, der nicht blos volkommener Meister seines Instrumentes, sondern auch vom Geiste Bach'scher Grossartigkeit durchdrungen ist" ("the provision of annotations comes from a man who is not merely a perfect master of his instrument, but also suffused with the sublimity of Bach's spirit").

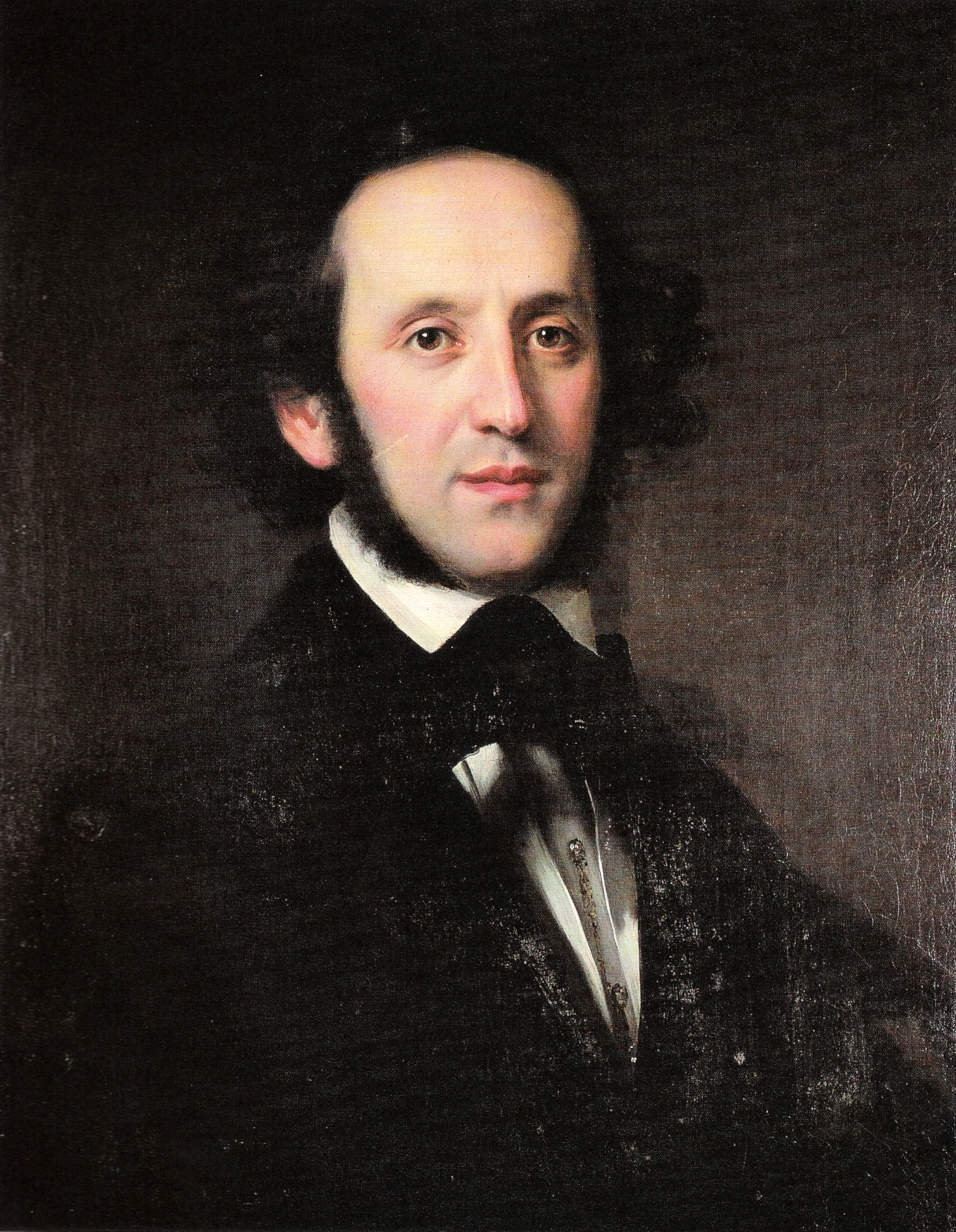
Felix Mendelssohn

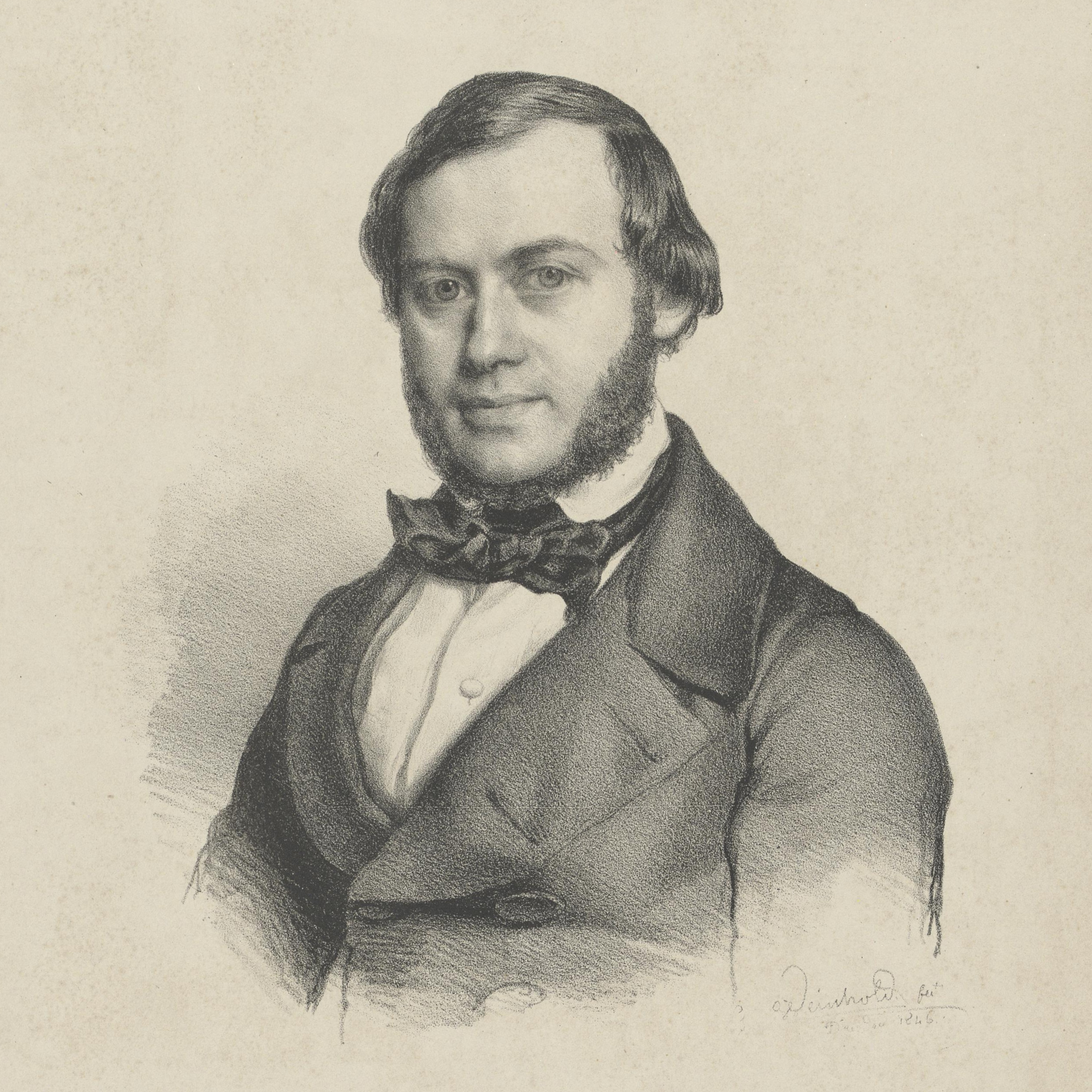
Ferdinand David

The Berlin violinist, Ferdinand David, was concertmaster at the Gewandhaus, while Felix Mendelssohn was director; their association dated back to their infancy, as they were born within a year of each other in the same house. A champion of Bach's music and, with Robert Schumann, one of the main musicians leading the Bach revival in Germany, Mendelssohn would often include Bach's lesser known works in the programmes of the evening chamber music concerts at the Gewandhaus: in 1838 David and Mendelssohn performed the third sonata in E major BWV 1016; and in 1840 David played the Chaconne in D minor and Praeludium in E major from Bach's sonatas and partitas for solo violin with piano accompaniments provided by Mendelssohn; he felt that a piano accompaniment was needed to make the solo violin works more accessible to a nineteenth century audience. The Chaconne was programmed in several subsequent Gewandhaus seasons; David was unwilling to perform it unaccompanied in public but the young Joseph Joachim did so while briefly sharing the first desk with David. In Leipzig the firm of Friedrich Kistner published David's performing version of the solo sonatas and partitas in 1843. Later Mendelssohn had the arrangement of the Chaconne published in England in 1847; piano accompaniments were subsequently provided for all Bach's solo violin works by Schumann. In 1864 David prepared an edition of BWV 1014–1016 for Peters which was reissued ten years later by Breitkopf & Härtel.

=== England ===
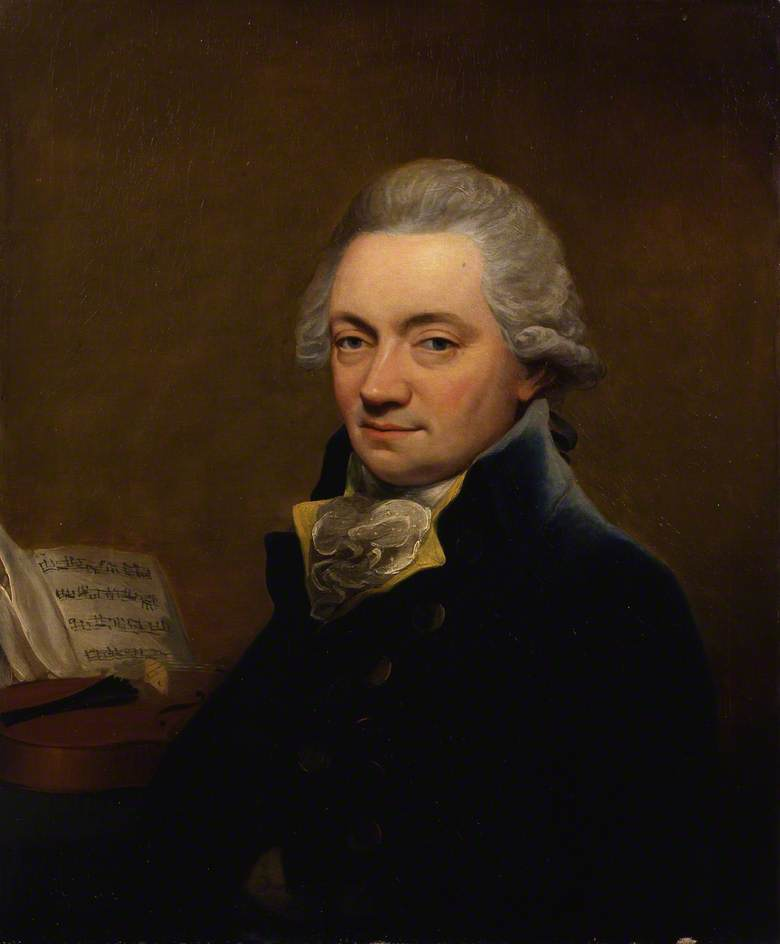
Johann Peter Salomon, portrait by Thomas Hardy, 1792, Royal College of Music

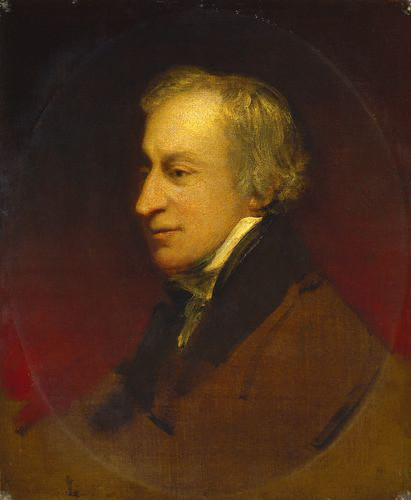
Samuel Wesley

I am in the utmost Distress, & there is no one on Earth but yourself can help me out of it. Dr. Burney is stark staring mad to hear Sebastian's Sonatas, & I have told him all how & about your adroit Management of his Music in general. He was immediately resolved on hearing you on the Clavicembalum & me on the fiddle at them. He has appointed Monday next at 12 o'Clock for our coming to him ... The triumph of Burney over his own Ignorance & Prejudice is such a glorious Event that surely we must make some sacrifice to enjoy it. I mentioned Kollmann as quite capable of playing the Sonatas, but you will see [...] that he prefers you. Pray comply in this arduous Enterprize. Remember our cause, "Good Will towards Men" is at the bottom of it, & when Sebastian flourishes here, there will be at least more musical "Peace on Earth."

— Letter from Samuel Wesley to Benjamin Jacobs, September 1809

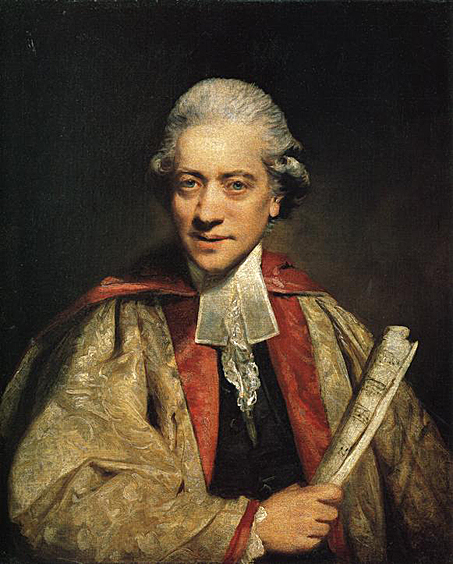
Charles Burney, portrait by Joshua Reynolds, 1781

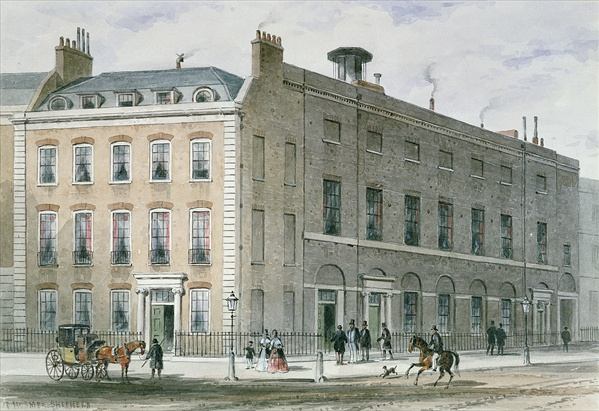
Hanover Square Rooms, set up by Johann Christian Bach and Carl Friedrich Abel in 1774, was one of the main concert venues in London for over a century

The sonatas BWV 1014–1019 figured prominently in the "English Bach awakening" that took place at the beginning of the 19th century, largely due to the efforts of Samuel Wesley. In 1809, while arranging the future publication with Charles Frederick Horn of the Well Tempered Clavier (sold by subscription in four instalments), Wesley began to stage performances of Bach's works in London with the help of Horn, Vincent Novello and Benjamin Jacobs, organist at the Surrey Chapel, Southwark. The public concerts included keyboard works—with some of Bach's organ works arranged for piano three hands—and often one of the sonatas for violin and harpsichord, with the German violinist Johann Peter Salomon as soloist and Wesley at the keyboard. For the first concerts, when Salomon was unavailable, Wesley played the violin part himself, although somewhat out of practice. Prior to the first public concert with organ accompaniment in the Surrey Chapel in November 1809, Wesley and Jacobs had also given a private performance of all six sonatas to Charles Burney, a venerable Handelian, recently converted to Bachism by Wesley.

Salomon was already familiar with Bach's compositions for violin through Bach's son Carl Philipp Emanuel whom he knew from his period in Berlin, where he had served from 1764 to 1780 as director of music to Prince Heinrich of Prussia, the younger brother of Frederick the Great. In 1774 Johann Friedrich Reichardt had reported on Salomon's performances of the "magnificent violin solos by Bach without accompaniment" in Berlin, praising "the great power and sureness with which Salomon presented these masterpieces." In London thirty years later, at Wesley's 1810 benefit concert in the Hanover Square Rooms, Salomon again performed one of the unaccompanied sonatas together with one of the sonatas for violin and harpsichord, with Wesley at the keyboard. More of the sonatas BWV 1014–1019 were included in subsequent concerts featuring Salomon: two were played for the first time in 1812 in a Surrey Chapel recital with Jacob at the organ.

=== France ===
Woodcut of the pianist Marie Bigot

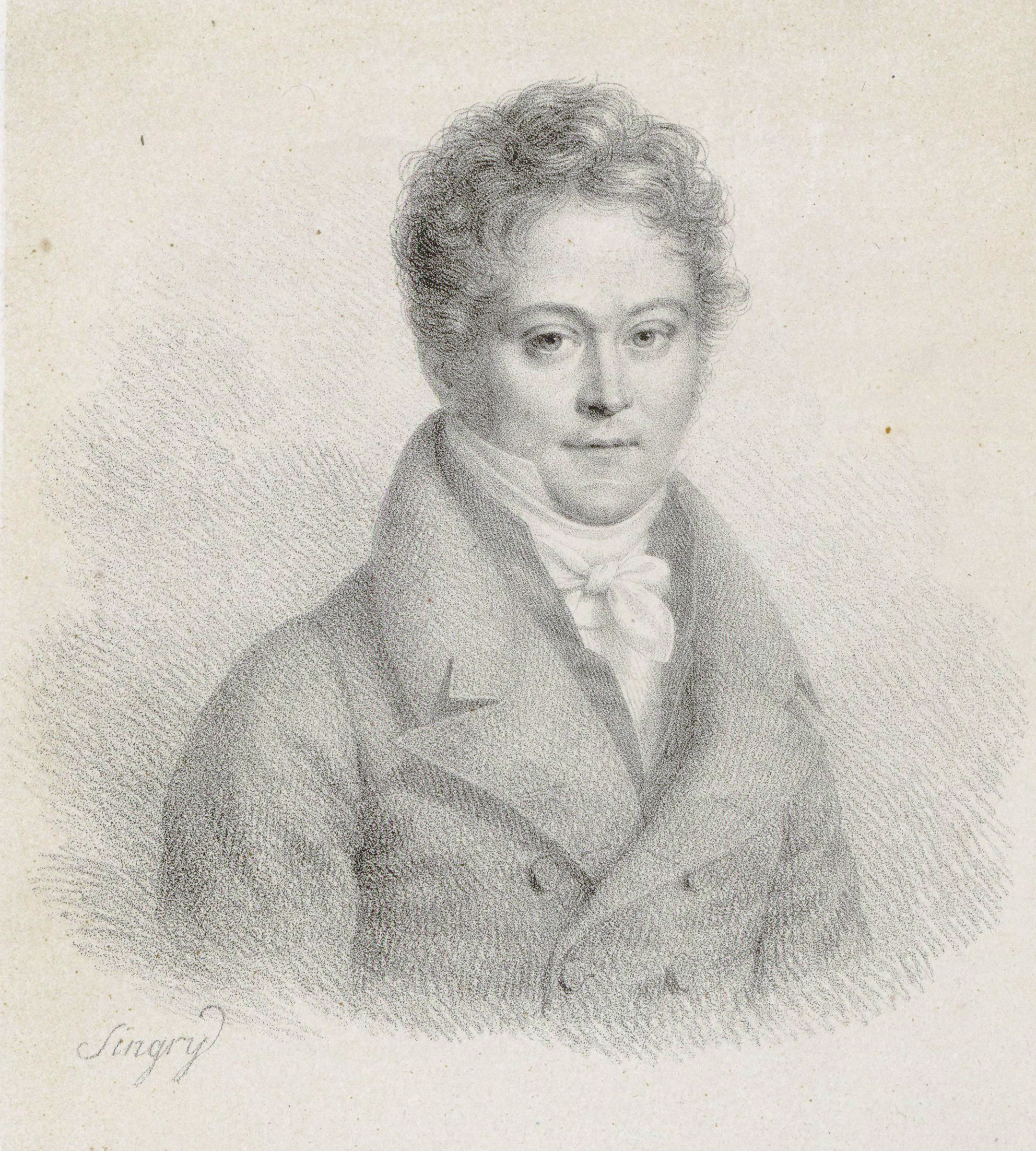
Pierre Baillot, violinist

At the turn of the nineteenth century, the chamber music of Bach became known in Paris thanks to the intermediary Marie Bigot. Born in Colmar in 1786, she was a highly accomplished keyboard player. In 1804, she moved to Vienna, where her performances attracted the admiration of Haydn, Salieri and Beethoven; her husband served as librarian to Beethoven's patron Count Razumovsky. In Vienna she became familiar with the keyboard and chamber music of Bach through the musical circles of Baron van Swieten, who had died a year before her arrival. Obliged to return to France in 1809 because of the Napoleonic wars, during the period 1809–1813 she proceeded to mount concerts in Paris with the violinist Pierre Baillot and the cellist Jacques-Michel Hurel de Lamare. After 1813, as a result of political events, she restricted herself to teaching, taking Felix Mendelssohn and his sister Fanny as pupils in 1816–1817.

Bach's sonatas for violin and keyboard featured in the repertoire of the Paris concerts and prompted the musicologist François-Joseph Fétis to comment that, "Anybody who has not heard Bach's beautiful compositions played by Mme Bigot, Lamare and Baillot will not know how far the perfection of instrumental music can go." Later around 1820 Fétis himself attempted unsuccessfully to advance the musique d'autre-fois of Bach: his invitation for subscriptions to a proposed publication of organ works by Bach elicited only three responses.

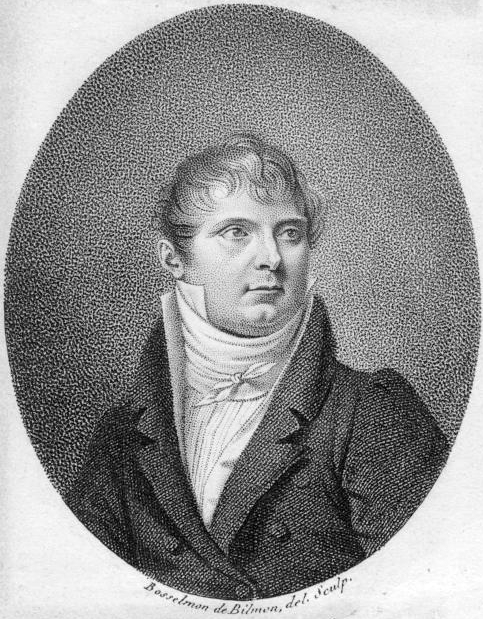
Jérôme-Joseph de Momigny

Another musicologist who had attended many of the recitals of Bigot was the musicologist Jérôme-Joseph de Momigny. Of their performance of BWV 1014 in 1810 he wrote:

This piece could be cold, monotonous and old-fashioned if poorly played; but felt and played as Mme Bigot and M Baillot can feel it and play it, it leaves nothing to be desired; its only aspects from the past are some cadences that are not so easy to notice and are part of its period charm; but above all under the bow of Baillot these are brought to life in a delicious way and with a feeling imbued with devotion.

The writings of Momigny can be considered as marking the reawakening of an interest in Bach in France. Already in 1803, barely a year after the publication of Forkel's biography of Bach, he had started his study of polyphony with the fugues and sonatas of Bach. One of Momigny's main contributions was an article in the music section of the Encyclopédie méthodique ou par ordre de matière (1818) analysing the sonatas BWV 1014 and BWV 1015/1. The article discusses the development of the sonata in the eighteenth century, divided into halves, with the sonatas of Bach, in Nägeli's edition, taken as representatives for 1700–1750 and the piano sonatas of Haydn for 1750–1800. Although Momigny enthusiastically wrote of Bach, c'est dans les trente ou quarante premières années du siècle dernier, qu'il offrit au public les fruits pleins de maturité de son génie transcendant,—"it was in the first thirty or forty years of the last century that he gave the public the fully matured fruits of his transcendent genius"—the general revival of interest in the music of Bach, particularly his choral works, was slower in France than in Germany. While referring to the timelessness and influence of Bach's music, Momigny lamented that the sonatas were so rarely performed; he wrote that the time was not ripe because of changes in musical taste, but also observed that "there are very few people capable of playing them and understanding them".

At the beginning of the twentieth century there was an increased interest in classical chamber music in France. The onset of the First World War and resulting issues of nationalism prompted French music publishers to bring out their own editions of classic German works to replace German editions. Claude Debussy was the editor for Durand's version of BWV 1014–1019.

== Arrangements and transcriptions ==
BWV 1017 – 1. Siciliano

BWV 1017 – 3. Adagio
Performed by Petro Titiajev (violin) and Ivan Ostapovych (pipe organ)

- Arrangement of the six sonatas for viola and piano, Friedrich Hermann (1828–1907), Library of Viola Music, Breitkopf & Härtel.
- Arrangements by the German violinist August Wilhelmj:
  - Adagio, BWV 1016/i, for violin and organ, 1885, Berlin: Schlesinger.
  - Siciliano, BWV 1017/i, for violin and orchestra, 1885, Berlin: Schlesinger.
- Arrangements for piano:
  - Allegro, BWV 1014/i, two pianos, Michael Gottlieb.
  - Andante, BWV 1015/iii, piano solo, Ludwig Stark (1831–1884).
  - Adagio, BWV 1016/i, piano solo, Bernhard Kistler-Liebendörfer.
  - Siciliano, BWV 1017/i, piano solo: Heinrich Bungart (1864–1910); Eric Kuhlstrom (1860–1940); and Ludwig Stark.
  - Adagio, BWV 1017/iii, piano solo, Bernhard Kistler-Liebendörfer.
  - Adagio, BWV 1018/iii, piano solo; Bernhard Kistler-Liebendörfer; and Alexander Siloti (1863–1945).
  - Allegro, BWV 1019/i, piano solo, Erich Doflein (1900–1977).
- Arrangement of Siciliano, BWV 1017/i, for violin and harp, Franz Poenitz (1850–1912), Berlin: Carl Simon Musikverlag.
- Arrangement of Adagio, BWV 1017/iii, for organ, Franz Liszt, 1866.

== Selected recordings ==
- Michèle Auclair, Marie-Claire Alain (organ), 1957, Les Discophiles Français – DF 209-210 Remastered 2021.
- Yehudi Menuhin, Louis Kentner (piano), 1951, Membran reissue 2007
- Joseph Suk, Zuzana Růžičková (harpsichord), Elatus Records (four different recordings between 1964 and 1998)
- Arthur Grumiaux, Egida Giordani Sartori (harpsichord), Philips, 1964.
- Henryk Szeryng, Helmut Walcha (harpsichord), Philips, 1970.
- Sigiswald Kuijken, Gustav Leonhardt (harpsichord), Harmonia Mundi, 1974.
- Jaime Laredo, Glenn Gould (piano), Columbia Masterworks, 1976.
- Arthur Grumiaux, Christiane Jaccottet (harpsichord), Philips, 1978.
- Reinhard Goebel, Robert Hill (harpsichord), Archiv, 1982.
- Monica Huggett, Ton Koopman (harpsichord), Philips, 1989.
- Susanne Lautenbacher, Leonore Klinckerfuss (harpsichord), Bayer Records, 1989.
- Alice Piérot, Martin Gester (organ), Decca Records, 1993.
- Viktoria Mullova, Bruno Canino (piano), Philips, 1993 (Sonatas 1, 2 & 6)
- Ryo Terakado, Siebe Henstra, Denon, 1996
- Fabio Biondi, Rinaldo Alessandrini (harpsichord), Opus 111, 1996.
- Catherine Mackintosh, Maggie Cole (harpsichord), Chandos, 1996.
- Luis Otavio Santos, Pieter-Jan Belder (harpsichord), Brilliant Classics, 1999.
- Andrew Manze, Richard Egarr (harpsichord), Jaap ter Linden (viola da gamba), Harmonia Mundi, 2000.
- John Holloway, Davitt Moroney (harpsichord), Virgin Classics, 2000.
- Rachel Podger, Trevor Pinnock (harpsichord), Channel, 2002.
- Giuliano Carmignola, Andrea Marcon (harpsichord), Sony, 2002.
- Emlyn Ngai, Peter Watchorn (harpsichord), Musica Omnia, 2002.
- Elizabeth Blumenstock, John Butt (harpsichord), Harmonia Mundi, 2005.
- Stefano Montanari, Christophe Rousset (harpsichord), Ambroisie, 2006.
- Viktoria Mullova, Ottavio Dantone (harpsichord), Onyx, 2007.
- Frank Peter Zimmermann, Enrico Pace (piano), Medici Arts, 2009.
- Jochen Brusch, Sven-Ingvart Mikkelsen (organ), Classico, 2010.
- Louis Creac'h, Jean-Luc Ho (harpsichord), Son an ero / Cordes & Ames, 2011.
- Catherine Manson, Ton Koopman (harpsichord), Challenge Classics, 2012.
- Chiara Banchini, Jörg-Andreas Bötticher (harpsichord), Zigzag Records, 2012.
- Michelle Makarski, Keith Jarrett (piano), ECM Records, 2013.
- Lucy Russell, John Butt (harpsichord), Linn Records, 2015.
- Leila Schayegh, Jörg Halubek (harpsichord), Glossa Records, 2015.
- Itzhak Perlman, Martha Argerich (piano), BWV 1017, Warner Classics, 2016.
- Isabelle Faust, Kristian Bezuidenhout (harpsichord), Harmonia Mundi, 2018./
- Nicolas Dautricourt, Juho Pohjonen (piano), la dolce volta, 2018.
- Rachel Barton Pine, Jory Vinikour (harpsichord), Çedille, 2018.
