= Klengel =

Klengel is a German surname. People with that name include:

- August Alexander Klengel (1783-1852), German pianist, organist and composer, son of Johann Christian
- Johann Christian Klengel (1751-1824), German engraver and painter, father of August Alexander
- Julius Klengel (1859-1933), German cellist and composer, brother of Paul
- Paul Klengel (1854-1935), German violinist/violist/pianist and composer, brother of Julius
- Wolf Caspar von Klengel (1634-1691), Baroque architect in Dresden
