= Partita for keyboard No. 6, BWV 830 =

Suite composed by Johann Sebastian Bach

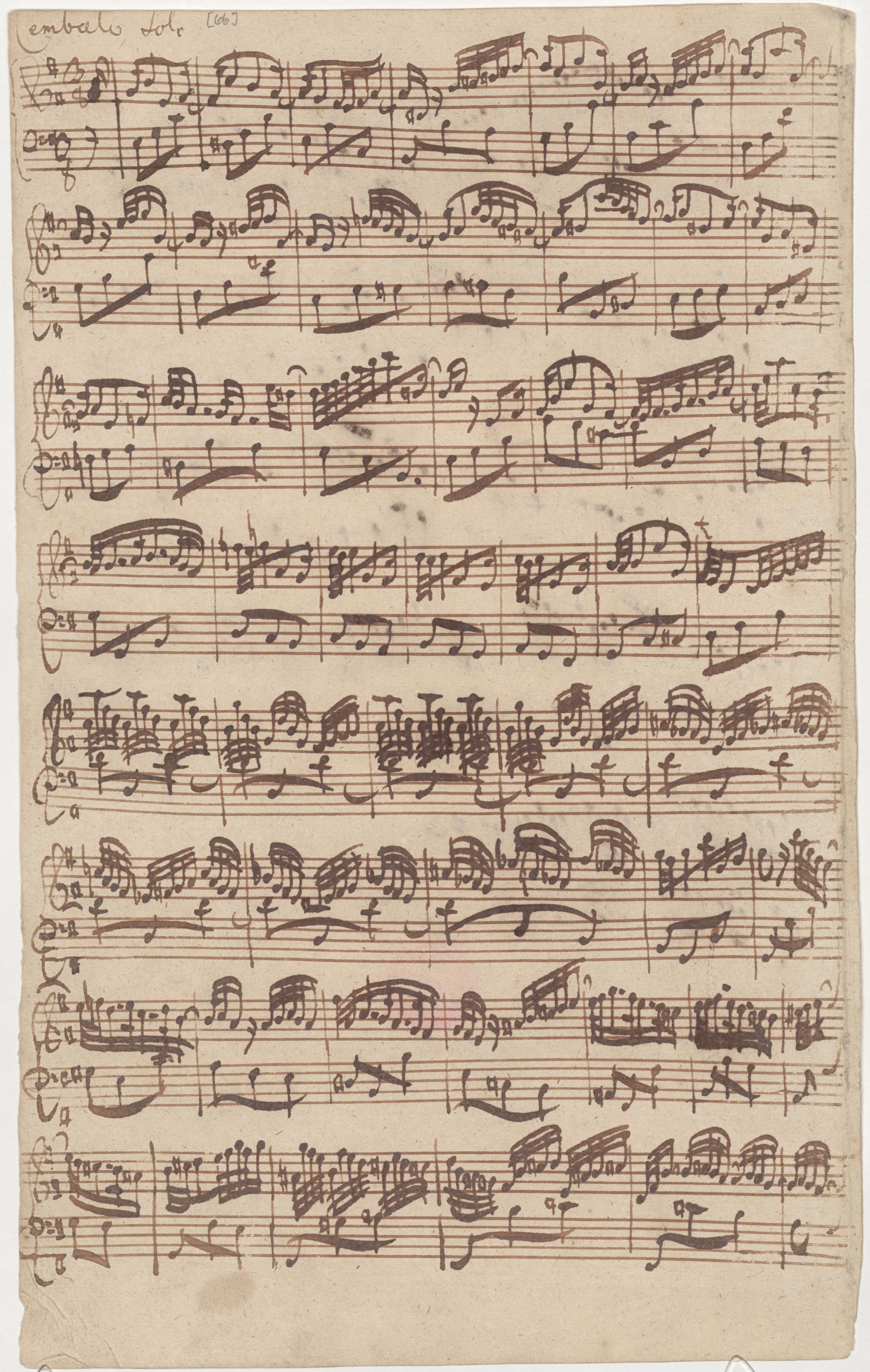
Autograph manuscript (1725) of Allegro for solo harpsichord from first version of Bach's sixth sonata for obbligato harpsichord and violin, BWV 1019a, later published as the Corrente in BWV 830

The Partita for keyboard No. 6 in E minor, BWV 830, is a suite of seven movements written for the harpsichord by Johann Sebastian Bach. It was published in 1731 both as a separate work and as part of Bach's Clavier-Übung I.

== History ==
Prior to publication, two movements of BWV 830 formed part of the first version of the sixth sonata in E minor for obbligato harpsichord and violin, BWV 1019: the Corrente as a harpsichord solo; and the Tempo di gavotta as a duo for violin and harpsichord. The surviving manuscript, largely written by Bach's nephew Johann Heinrich Bach, has been dated to 1725; the harpsichord parts for these two movements were written by Bach himself. BWV 830 is the last suite in Bach's Clavier-Übung I, the first music published by Bach within his lifetime. The partitas were initially published separately, starting in 1726; the title page of the collection of six, published together in 1731, carries the designation "Opus 1".

== Musical structure ==
This partita consists of seven movements all in E minor.

1. Toccata
2. Allemanda
3. Corrente
4. Air
5. Sarabande
6. Tempo di Gavotta
7. Gigue

== Reception and legacy ==
David Schulenberg describes this partita: "The Sixth Partita is the crowning work of the set and Bach's greatest suite. The allemande and sarabande contain some of the most audacious and dramatic melodic embellishment ever written, and the work opens and closes with two particularly ambitious contrapuntal movements." Peter Williams, however, considers that some movements from Clavier-Übung I that were composed earlier than others, such as the Gigue from BWV 830, have a "grinding quality that is totally absent from the elegant and novel No. 1."

Martin Gester says about Sarabande in his notes in the booklet to his recording of partitas: "As for the following Sarabande, it plunges us into deep reflection. It is a pure lamento and perhaps the most intensely expressive piece in all of Bach's works for harpsichord."

American composer George Rochberg's harpsichord fantasia Nach Bach contains direct musical quotations from this partita.
