= Nach Bach =

1966 composition by George Rochberg

Nach Bach (German for "After Bach", subtitled Fantasia for harpsichord), is a composition for harpsichord or piano by American composer George Rochberg, written in 1966 and dedicated to his friend Igor Kipnis, who premièred the work in Annenberg Auditorium at the University of Pennsylvania on 27 January 1967.

== History ==
Rochberg composed this piece while still serving as chairman of the music department at the University of Pennsylvania. He had just abandoned serialism three years previously in 1963, the year before his father died, in the spring, and in November of the same year his teenage son, Paul died of a brain tumor. The composer said it was after his son died that

it became crystal clear to me that I could not continue writing so-called 'serial' music... It was finished...hollow...meaningless. It also became clearer than ever before that the only justification for claiming one was engaged in the artistic act was to open one's art completely to life and its entire gamut of terrors and joys (real and imagined); and to find, if one could, new ways to transmute these into whatever magic one was capable of.

He also said he had found serialism to be a style incapable of expressing "serenity, tranquility, grace, wit, energy and perhaps most importantly, joy". His last serial work was the Trio for violin, cello, and piano, written in 1963.

Rochberg composed the work at Tanglewood in the summer of 1966, on a commission from the harpsichordist Igor Kipnis. At the time, Rochberg knew virtually nothing about the technical problems of the harpsichord, so before setting to work had a long discussion with Kipnis who demonstrated the use of pedals, the attack and timbral characteristics of the instrument, which enabled the composer to incorporate every possible color combination available on Kipnis's custom-built instrument into the structure of the piece. The manuscript score is dated July 6, 1966, and at that point was designated only for the harpsichord. The score was revised for publication, to include registration markings for the harpsichord added by the dedicatee, Igor Kipnis, and accommodations for performance on the piano, including dynamic markings, indications for pedaling, and ossia passages (on pages 4.1, 4.2, and 8.2) in which some notes are to be played an octave higher on the piano than in the version for harpsichord.

== Structure ==
This work is in free form, like many other fantasias, with long sections with durations in unmeasured notation. The composer describes this form as "open, asymmetrical and progressive, i.e., non-repetitive, and so akin, in spirit at least, to the old 'fantasia' idea of Bach and Mozart". In the score, according to the composer, passages marked in boxes are direct quotes from J. S. Bach's Partita No. 6 in E minor, BWV 830, and should be played as dramatic "inserts". In addition to these direct quotations, all of which occur in the second of its five main sections, there are many non-literal quotations and pitch segments derived from Bach's composition. There is also a quotation from a Brahms Intermezzo on the last page.

The general texture of the work is freely atonal, with rhythms written in indeterminate notation. One of the most striking features of the work is the contrast between this predominant texture and the quotations from Bach. A free-form composition with an improvisatory character, the work nevertheless falls into five large sections, with a transitional passage between sections two and three. The sections are discriminated by the use of strong cadences, long pauses, and changes in texture, density, tempo, mood, and dynamics. Dissonances are also used to differentiate the sections.

Although it does not employ twelve-tone technique, several twelve-tone sets occur in the piece, including one that opens the work: B♭, E, B, C♯, D, C, E♭, F, G♭, A, A♭, G, which divides into a pair of [0, 1, 2, 3, 4, 6] hexachords. Many of the main pitch elements of the piece are derived from this set. Three further twelve-tone sets occur in the second main section, and two in the third.

== Discography ==
Performed on harpsichord

- Three Sides of George Rochberg. Carnival Music (suite for piano solo); Black Sounds for 17 players; Nach Bach, fantasy for harpsichord. Alan Mandel, piano; Igor Kipnis, harpsichord; Oberlin Wind Ensemble. LP recording. 1 disc: 33 1/3 rpm., stereo., 12 in. Grenadilla GS-1019. [N.p.]: Grenadilla Records, 1977. Also issued on tape, 1 audio cassette, 1 7/8 ips .Avery 5250 [United States]: [Avery], 1977. Nach Bach reissued on Norton Recorded Anthology of Western Music, edited by Claude V Palisca and Donald Jay Grout. Classic to Modern, Volume 2, CD 12. With works by Webern, Messiaen, Ives, Crawford Seeger, Copland, Still, Carter, Crumb, Babbitt, Schuller, and Reich. CD, 1 audio disc; 4 3/4 in. Sony Music Special Products A 26650; A12 26638; PN 10153. New York: W.W. Norton, Sony Music Special Products, 1996.

Performed on piano

- George Rochberg: Four Decades of keyboard Music. Twelve Bagatelles (1952); Nach Bach (1966); Partita-Variations (1976); Four Short Sonatas (1984). Martha Lynn Thomas, piano. Recorded July 13–26, 1995, at ACA Digital Recording Studio, Atlanta. CD recording, 1 sound disc: digital, 4 3/4 in. ACA CM 20044. Atlanta: ACA, 1997.
- George Rochberg: keyboard Music. Partita-Variations; Nach Bach; Sonata-Fantasia; Carnival Music; Four Short Sonatas; Variations on an Original Theme. Sally Pinkas, piano. Recorded at Spaulding Auditorium, Dartmouth College, December 1996 and June 1997. CD recording, 2 sound discs: digital; 4 3/4 in., stereo. Gasparo GSCD-340/2. Peterborough, N.H.: Gasparo, 1999. First disc (first three works) reissued on Naxos 8.559633. [Hong Kong]: Naxos, 2010.
- Twentieth Century American keyboard Music. Dello Joio: Piano Sonata No. 3; Hindemith: Sonata No. 2; Vincent Persichetti: Poems for Piano Vol. 1; Krenek: Sonata No. 3, Op. 92, No. 4; Rochberg: Nach Bach; Cowell: Three representative works; Cage: Sonatas and Interludes for prepared piano; Robert Morris: Three Pieces for Piano. Peter Coraggio, piano. Recorded at the Orvis Auditorium, University of Hawaii at Manoa, between 1967–1969. CD recording, 2 sound discs: digital, 4 3/4 in., stereo. Sinergia SR 5020. [Hawaii]: Sinergia, 2005.
- George Rochberg: Carnival Music; Nach Bach; Partita-Variations. Paul Chihara; Bagatelles: Twice Seven Haiku for piano Ned Rorem: 75 Notes for Jerry. Jerome Lowenthal, piano. Recorded May 31, June 1 and 4, 2013, American Academy of Arts and Letters, New York. CD 1 audio disc: digital, CD audio; 4 3/4 in., stereo. BRIDGE 9417. New York: Bridge Records, 2014.
