= Jérôme-Joseph de Momigny =

Belgian/French composer and music theorist (1762–1842)

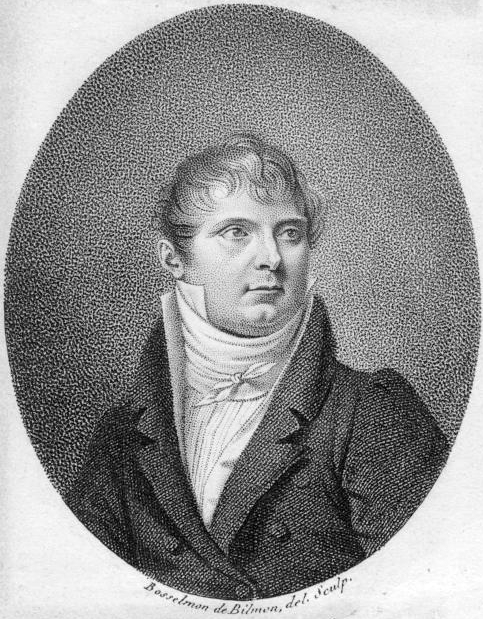
Jérôme-Joseph de Momigny

Jérôme-Joseph de Momigny (20 January 1762 – 25 August 1842) was a Belgian/French composer and music-theorist.

== Life ==
Momigny was born in Philippeville, Belgium. He composed music and wrote books including Momigny, which he printed himself.

His theories about rhythm and musical phrasing were ahead of his time. From 1803 to 1806, he published his most notorious work Cours complet d'harmonie et de composition, d'après une théorie neuve et générale de la musique (in three volumes). It features, among others, a new theory about the significance of the upbeat over the downbeat, which was later taken up by Hugo Riemann.

He died in the Charenton asylum.

== Publications ==
Writings in music

- Cours complet d'harmonie et de composition d'après une théorie neuve et générale de la musique, 3 vols (1806)
- Exposé succinct du seul système musical qui soit vraiment fondé et complet, lu à la classe des beaux-arts de l'Institut, le 17 décembre 1808 (1808)
- Réponse aux observations de M. Morel, ou à ses attaques contre la seule vraie théorie de la musique, n. d.

Political writings

- De l'ordre et du désordre, et de l'ordre du jour (1825)
- De la monarchie selon elle-même et selon Dieu et le bon sens, essai dédié aux puissances paternelles, seules amies de l'humanité, seules conformes à la raison (1826)
- À MM. les députés des départemens (1828)
- À Louis-Philippe, roi des Français, de l'ordre et du désordre dans les êtres et les choses (1831)
- La Grande nouvelle humanitaire (1837)
- À la France de la monarchie et du bon ordre (n. d.)

== Bibliography ==
- Albert Palm: Jérôme-Joseph de Momigny: Leben und Werk. Ein Beitrag zur Geschichte der Musiktheorie im 19. Jahrhundert (Köln: Arno Volk Verlag, 1969)
- Jacques Chailley: Un grand théoricien belge méconnu de la musique: J.-J. de Momigny (Brussels, 1966)
- Glenn Gerald Caldwell: Harmonic Tonality in the Music Theories of Jerome-Joseph Momigny, 1762–1842 (Studies in the History and Interpretation of Music, vol. 79) (2001)
