= August Alexander Klengel =

German pianist, organist and composer

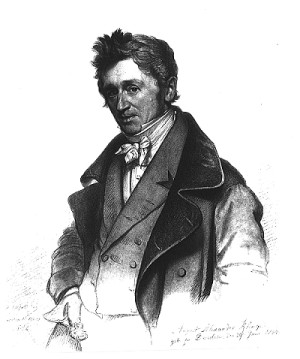
The portrait of organist and composer August Alexander Klengel, by Carl Christian Vogel von Vogelstein. Date unknown.

August Stephan Alexander Klengel (29 June 1783, Dresden – 22 November 1852, Dresden) was a German pianist, organist and composer.

== Biography ==
Klengel was the son of landscape painter Johann Christian Klengel. He showed an early talent for music, and studied piano under (among others) Johann Peter Milchmeyer (1750–1813).

In 1803, Muzio Clementi, a renowned teacher, visited Dresden. He accepted Klengel as pupil, and took him with him on his travels. In 1805, they went together with Ludwig Berger to Saint Petersburg. Clementi next travelled to London, but Klengel remained in St Petersburg until 1811, giving piano lessons. He next moved to Paris in 1812; in 1814, he returned to Dresden; in 1815, he visited London, where the Philharmonic Society commissioned him to write a piece, and he wrote for them his Piano Quintet (for piano, violin, viola, cello and double bass). In 1816, he was appointed court composer to the King of Saxony (at the time, Frederick Augustus I), in Dresden. Except for brief visits to Paris and Brussels, he remained in that city for the rest of his life.

His Canons and Fugues for Piano, in All the Major and Minor Keys were first published in 1854, after his death. In them, Klengel attempted to synthesise the lessons he had drawn both from Bach and from Clementi. (In his text-book Applied Counterpoint, page 287, Percy Goetschius recommends analysis of Klengel's Canons and Fugues.)

== Compositions ==
These include:

- Canons and Fugues for Piano, in All the Major and Minor Keys (1854)
- Fantasy for piano four hands, Op. 31
- Grande Polonaise Concertante for piano, flute, clarinet and strings, Op. 35
- Piano Concertos, Op. 4 and 15/29
- Piano Sonatas, Op. 1, 2 and 9
- Piano Trio, Op. 36

== Discography ==
- Romance in A major op.6, Anna Petrova-Forster, piano (Toccata Classics, TOCC 0417, 2018)
- Fantaisie sur un thème russe op.23, Anna Petrova-Forster, piano (Toccata Classics, TOCC 0417, 2018)
- 3 Romances sentimentales de caractère mélancolique op.34, Anna Petrova-Forster, piano (Toccata Classics, TOCC 0417, 2018)
- Air suisse avec variations op.32 for piano and violin, Anna Petrova-Forster, piano, Keiko Yamaguchi, violin (Toccata Classics, TOCC 0417, 2018)
- 6 Nocturnes op.23, Anna Petrova-Forster, piano (Toccata Classics, TOCC 0417, 2018)
- Grand Trio Concertant op.36, Trio Klengel (Keiko Yamaguchi, Stefania Verità, Anna Petrova-Forster, Toccata Classics, TOCC 0417, 2018)
