= Visual culture =

Aspect of culture expressed in visual images

Visual culture is the aspect of culture expressed in visual images. Many academic fields study this subject, including cultural studies, art history, critical theory, philosophy, media studies, Deaf Studies, and anthropology.

The field of visual culture studies in the United States corresponds or parallels the Bildwissenschaft ("image studies") in Germany. Both fields are not entirely new, as they can be considered reformulations of issues of photography and film theory that had been raised from the 1920s and 1930s by authors like Béla Balázs, László Moholy-Nagy, Siegfried Kracauer and Walter Benjamin.

== Overview ==
Among theorists working within contemporary culture, this field of study often overlaps with film studies, psychoanalytic theory, sex studies, queer theory, and the study of television; it can also include video game studies, comics, traditional artistic media, advertising, the Internet, and any other medium that has a crucial visual component.

The field's versatility stems from the range of objects contained under the term "visual culture", which aggregates "visual events in which information, meaning, or pleasure is sought by the consumer in an interface with visual technology". The term "visual technology" refers to any media designed for purposes of perception or with the potential to augment our visual capability.

Because of the changing technological aspects of visual culture as well as a scientific method-derived desire to create taxonomies or articulate what the "visual" is, many aspects of Visual Culture overlap with the study of science and technology, including hybrid electronic media, cognitive science, neurology, and image and brain theory. In an interview with the Journal of Visual Culture, academic Martin Jay explicates the rise of this tie between the visual and the technological: "Insofar as we live in a culture whose technological advances abet the production and dissemination of such images at a hitherto unimagined level, it is necessary to focus on how they work and what they do, rather than move past them too quickly to the ideas they represent or the reality they purport to depict. In so doing, we necessarily have to ask questions about ... technological mediations and extensions of visual experience."

"Visual Culture" goes by a variety of names at different institutions, including Visual and Critical Studies, Visual and Cultural Studies, and Visual Studies.

== Pictorial Turn ==
In the development of Visual Studies, WJT Mitchell's text on the "Pictorial Turn" was highly influential. In analogy to the linguistic turn, Mitchell stated that we were undergoing a major paradigm shift in sciences and society which turned images, rather than verbal language, to the paradigmatic vectors of our relationship to the world. Gottfried Boehm made similar claims in the German-speaking context, when talking about an "iconic turn", as did Marshall McLuhan when speaking of television in terms of creating an "intensely visual culture".

== Visualism ==
The term "Visualism" was developed by the German anthropologist Johannes Fabian to criticise the dominating role of vision in scientific discourse, through such terms as observation. He points to an under theorised approach to the use of visual representation which leads to a corpuscular theory of knowledge and information which leads to their atomisation.

== Relationship with other areas of study ==
=== Art history ===
As visual culture studies, in the United States, have begun to address areas previously studied by art history, there have been disputes between the two fields. One of the reasons for controversy was that the various approaches in art history, like formalism, iconology, social history of art, or New Art History, focused only on artistic images, assuming a distinction with non-artistic ones, while in visual culture studies there is typically no such distinction.

=== Performance studies ===
Visual culture studies may also overlap with another emerging field, that of performance studies. As "the turn from art history to visual culture studies parallels a turn from theater studies to performance studies", it is clear that the perspectival shift that both emerging fields embody is comparable.

=== Image studies ===
While the image remains a focal point in visual culture studies, it is the relations between images and consumers that are evaluated for their cultural significance, not just the image in and of itself. Martin Jay clarifies, "Although images of all kinds have long served as illustrations of arguments made discursively, the growth of visual culture as a field has allowed them to be examined more in their own terms as complex figural artifacts or the stimulants to visual experiences."

Likewise, W. J. T. Mitchell explicitly distinguishes the two fields in his claim that visual culture studies "helps us to see that even something as broad as the image does not exhaust the field of visuality; that visual studies is not the same thing as image studies, and that the study of the visual image is just one component of the larger field."

=== Bildwissenschaft ===
Though the development of Bildwissenschaft ("image-science") in the German-speaking world to an extent paralleled that of the field of visual culture in the United Kingdom and United States, Bildwissenschaft occupies a more central role in the liberal arts and humanities than that afforded to visual culture. Significant differences between Bildwissenschaft and Anglophone cultural and visual studies include the former's examination of images dating from the early modern period, and its emphasis on continuities over breaks with the past. Whereas Anglo-American visual studies can be seen as a continuation of critical theory in its attempt to reveal power relations, Bildwissenschaft is not explicitly political. WJT Mitchell and Gottfried Boehm have had a discussion about these potential differences in an exchange of letters.

== History ==
Early work on visual culture has been done by John Berger (Ways of Seeing, 1972) and Laura Mulvey (Visual Pleasure and Narrative Cinema, 1975) that follows on from Jacques Lacan's theorization of the unconscious gaze. Twentieth-century pioneers such as György Kepes and William Ivins Jr. as well as iconic phenomenologists like Maurice Merleau-Ponty also played important roles in creating a foundation for the discipline. For the history of art, Svetlana Alpers published a pioneering study on The Art of Describing: Dutch Art in the Seventeenth Century (Chicago 1983) in which she took up an earlier impulse of Michael Baxandall to study the visual culture of a whole region of early-modern Europe in all its facets: landscape painting and perception, optics and perspectival studies, geography and topographic measurements, united in a common mapping impulse.

Major works on visual culture include those by W. J. T. Mitchell, Griselda Pollock, Giuliana Bruno, Stuart Hall, Roland Barthes, Jean-François Lyotard, Rosalind Krauss, Paul Crowther and Slavoj Žižek. Continuing work has been done by Lisa Cartwright, Marita Sturken, Margaret Dikovitskaya, Nicholas Mirzoeff, Irit Rogoff and Jackie Stacey. The first book titled Visual Culture (Vizuális Kultúra) was written by Pál Miklós in 1976. For history of science and technology, Klaus Hentschel has published a systematic comparative history in which various patterns of their emergence, stabilization and diffusion are identified.

In the German-speaking world, analogous discussions about "Bildwissenschaft" (image studies) are conducted, a.o., by Gottfried Boehm, Hans Belting, and Horst Bredekamp. In the French-speaking world, the visual culture and the visual studies have been recently discussed, a.o., by Maxime Boidy, André Gunthert, Gil Bartholeyns.

Visual culture studies have been increasingly important in religious studies through the work of David Morgan, Sally M. Promey, Jeffrey F. Hamburger, and S. Brent Plate.

== See also ==
- Art education
- Art history
- Asemic writing
- Media influence
- Mediascape
- Sublime
- Visual anthropology
- Visual communication
- Visual ethics
- Visual literacy
- Visual rhetoric
- Visual sociology
