= Reimund Bieringer =

German theologian, priest and scholar

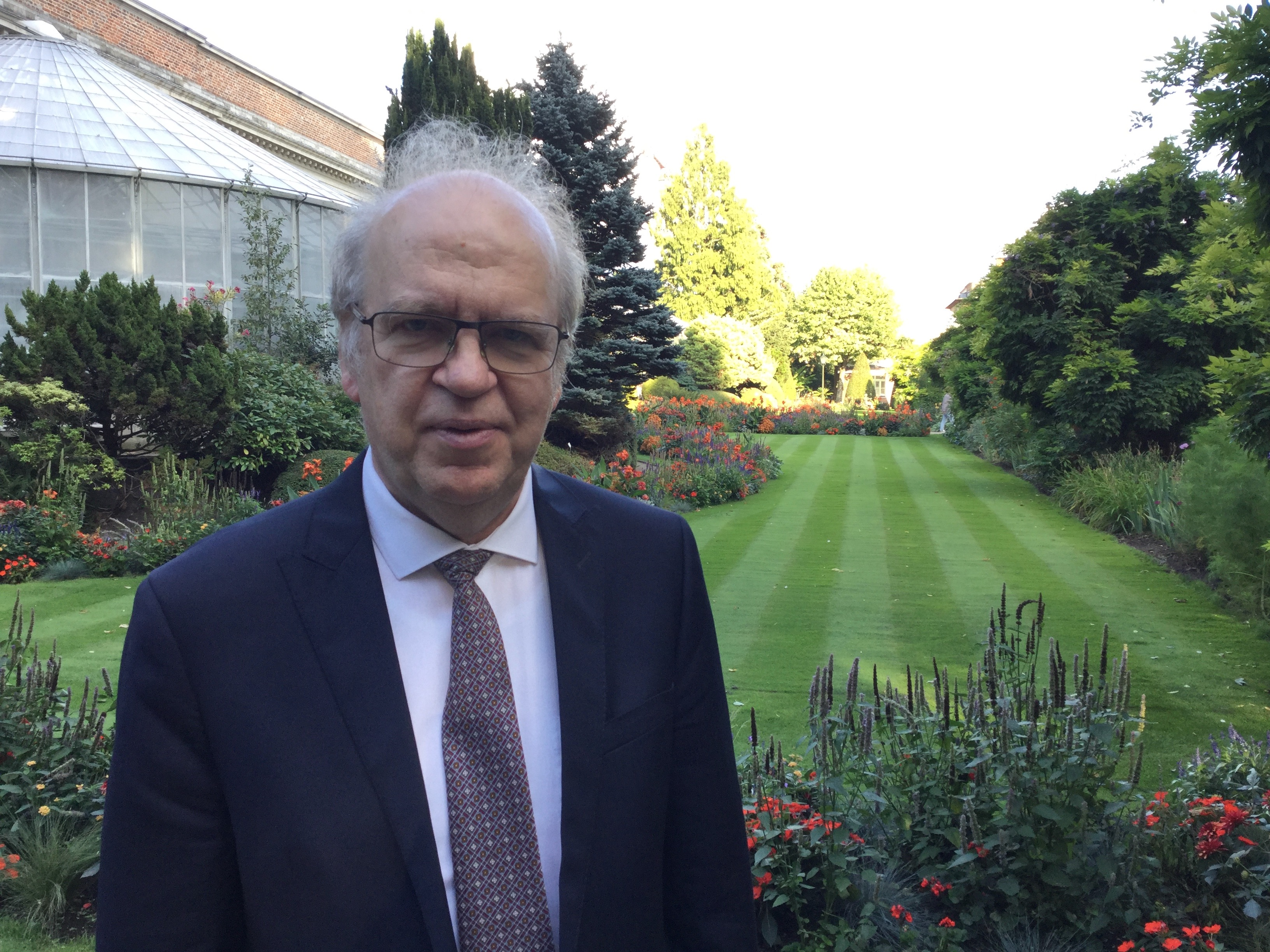
- Reimund Bieringer in 2018
- Born: 1957 (age 68–69)
- Title: Professor Doctor

Academic background
- Education: KU Leuven
- Thesis: "Lasst euch mit Gott versöhnen": Eine exegetische Untersuchung zu 2 Kor 5,14-21 in seinem Kontext, (1986)
- Doctoral advisor: Jan Lambrecht

Academic work
- Discipline: New Testament scholar
- Sub-discipline: Pauline studies, Anti-Judaism in the New Testament, Johannine studies, feminist theology
- Institutions: KU Leuven
- Doctoral students: Archbishop Mar Joseph Pamplany; Virginia Rajakumari

Reimund Bieringer (born 1957) is a German theologian, biblical scholar, Professor Emeritus (with formal duties) of New Testament Exegesis at the Faculty of Theology and Religious Studies, KU Leuven, Belgium, and a Roman Catholic priest of the Diocese of Speyer in Germany. The main areas of his research include the Second Letter to the Corinthians (exegesis and theology), the Gospel of John (Anti-Judaism and the Gospel of John; Mary Magdalene and the Noli me tangere), and biblical hermeneutics (normativity of the future).

== Education and academic career ==
Bieringer first studied theology at the Sankt Georgen Graduate School of Philosophy and Theology, and then continued his studies at the Faculty of Theology of the KU Leuven, Belgium, where he defended his doctorate in 1986. His doctoral dissertation presents an exegesis of 2 Corinthians 5:14-21 in its epistolary context and is partially published in Studies on 2 Corinthians.

In 1988 he was ordained a priest in the Roman Catholic Diocese of Speyer, and served in a parish in Rodalben as assistant priest until 1990, when he was appointed as a full-time staff member of the Faculty of Theology (now Faculty of Theology and Religious Studies) at KU Leuven. Between 2008 and 2012 he served as vice-dean for research of that faculty. Since 2014 he has been the coordinator of the Biblical Studies Research Unit. He was also the co-founder and is currently the head of the Faculty's Centre for Women's Studies Theology. He also chairs the Research Group Exegesis, Hermeneutics and Theology of the Corpus Paulinum and Corpus Johanneum. Since 2011, he has been serving as the secretary of the Colloquium Biblicum Lovaniense.

Between 2012 and 2015 Bieringer served as the president of the European Association of Biblical Studies and is currently the president of the Flemish Bible Society. He is also the secretary of Colloquium Oecumenicum Paulinum, and in 2010 served as its president.

== Contribution to Biblical studies ==
=== Reconciliation and 2 Corinthians ===
The theology and the background of Paul's Second Letter to the Corinthians have belonged to Bieringer's main research interests since the beginning of his academic career. He is known to be one of the long-standing defenders of the letter's unity and integrity.

In his doctoral work, supervised by Jan Lambrecht, and in subsequent publications, he has argued that the genesis of Paul's use of the concept of reconciliation in reference to the divine-human relationship in 2 Cor 5:14-21 is to be sought in Paul's theological reflection on his personal experience of an initial reconciliation with the Corinthians. Bieringer has also suggested that, as opposed to the traditional understanding of καταλλάγητε (katallagēte) in 2 Cor 5:20d as passive, the verb has here a reflexive meaning and thus could be translated as "reconcile yourselves to God" rather than "be reconciled to God".

In a paper presented at the 2008 Society of Biblical Literature Annual Meeting in Boston, Bieringer proposed the term "theology in the making" to refer to the process whereby Paul's everyday life experiences and the resources at his disposal led to the development of Paul's profound theological insights. This paper constituted also an introduction to the series of seminar sessions on Second Corinthians: Pauline Theology in the Making, to take place every year at the Society of Biblical Literature Annual Meetings, from 2008 to 2019.

Some of Bieringer's insights on reconciliation in 2 Corinthians were taken over and developed in a doctoral dissertation by Ivar Vegge, published subsequently in the WUNT series.

=== Normativity of the future ===
In 1996 Bieringer began to develop an eschatological-oriented biblical hermeneutics, which came to be known as the normativity of the future approach. In dialogue with the theologian Mary Elsbernd (1946-2010) from Loyola University (Chicago) and their respective students, they elaborated this approach in the publication Normativity of the Future: Reading Biblical and Other Authoritative Texts in an Eschatological Perspective. The normativity of the future approach is rooted in a dialogical perspective on God's revelation, both through the Scriptures and the "signs of the times". Incorporating a variety of scholarly biblical methodologies, it focuses subsequently on the world behind, the world of, and especially the world in front of the text.

The approach traces the explicit or implicit eschatological vision(s) in a given biblical passage (such as the kingdom of God, the new heaven and the new earth, etc.) and seeks out the moral qualities of the text: its inclusive and exclusive dimensions, its pneumatological clues, its traces of the virtue of hope and its ethical demands. The normativity of the future approach also incorporates the hermeneutical meta-questions regarding the interpreter, the interpretive process and results, and their impact on communities, especially those who are oppressed.

To date, Bieringer continues to cultivate this approach, researching how Scriptures are used in various ways, such as in religious education in Australia and in interdisciplinary theologizing in a contextual manner.

=== Anti-Judaism and the Fourth Gospel ===
In collaboration with Didier Pollefeyt, Reimund Bieringer further developed the normativity of the future approach in the context of Jewish-Christian dialogue. Their joint project on the alleged anti-Jewish tendencies in the Fourth Gospel (esp. in John 8:31-59) resulted in the Leuven colloquium on Anti-Judaism and the Fourth Gospel in 2000 and has remained a research focus ever since. In 2016 their project in collaboration with Peter De Mey resulted in an expert seminar about The Spirit, Hermeneutics and Dialogues (Leuven, 25–27 May 2016).

=== Mary Magdalene and feminist approaches to the Fourth Gospel ===
Bieringer's research in John's Gospel and his use of a feminist lens in biblical studies paved the way for an interdisciplinary research project on John 20:1-17 entitled "Mary Magdalene and the Touching of Jesus. An Intra- and Interdisciplinary Investigation of the Interpretation of John 20:17 in Exegesis, Iconography and Pastoral Care, Research Foundation Flanders, 2005-2008." The research results were distributed through several articles and an edited volume on the topic, as well as radio interviews, lectures, debates and an exhibition on the image of Mary Magdalene and the iconography of the Noli me tangere.

=== Paul and Judaism ===
Bieringer's research also focuses on the question of continuity and discontinuity between Judaism and Christianity in Paul's time. The interdisciplinary project "New Perspectives on Paul and the Jews" investigated the role of Pauline theology in the process of Christian self-definition with respect to the Judaism of its time and dealt with the implications for present day Jewish-Christian dialogue.

== Prizes and awards ==
- Catholic Press Association Award Winner with the book Mary Elsbernd & Reimund Bieringer, When Love Is Not Enough. A Theo-Ethic of Justice.

== Select works ==
=== Books ===
- Bieringer, Reimund; Lambrecht, Jan (1994). Studies on 2 Corinthians. Bibliotheca Ephemeridum Theologicarum Lovaniensium. Vol. 112. Leuven: Leuven University Press – Peeters. ISBN 9789061866121. OCLC 35796326.
- ———; Elsbernd, Mary (2002). When Love Is Not Enough. A Theo-Ethic of Justice. Collegeville, MN: The Liturgical Press. ISBN 9780814659601. OCLC 47072963.
- ———; Baert, Barbara; Demasure, Karlijn; Van Den Eynde, Sabine (2006). Noli me tangere: Mary Magdalene: One Person, Many Images. Documenta libraria. Vol. 32. Leuven: Maurits Sabbebibliotheek - Faculteit Godgeleerdheid - Peeters. ISBN 9789042918078. OCLC 717462443.
- ———; Elsbernd, Mary (2010). Normativity of the Future: Reading Biblical and Other Authoritative Texts in an Eschatological Perspective. Annua Nuntia Lovaniensia. Vol. 61. Leuven & Paris & Dudley, MA: Peeters. ISBN 9789042922273. OCLC 535492848.

=== As editor ===
- ———; Pollefeyt, Didier; Vandecasteelde-Vanneuville, Frederique, eds. (2001). Anti-Judaism and the Fourth Gospel. Louisville, KY: Westminster John Knox Press. ISBN 9780664224110. OCLC 46538573.
- ———; Bolton, David J., eds. (2011). Reconciliation in Interfaith Perspective: Jewish, Christian and Muslim Voices. Leuven: Peeters. ISBN 9789042923911. OCLC 727114129.
- ———; Ibita, Ma. Marilou S.; Kurek-Chomycz, Dominika A.; Vollmer, Thomas A., eds. (2013). Theologizing in the Corinthian Conflict: Studies in the Exegesis and Theology of 2 Corinthians. Biblical Tools and Studies. Vol. 162. Leuven: Peeters Press. ISBN 9789042927544. OCLC 868578372.
- ———; Nathan, E.; Pollefeyt, Didier; Tomson, P. J., eds. (2014). Second Corinthians in the Perspective of Late Second Temple Judaism. Compendia Rerum Iudaicarum ad Novum Testamentum. Section 1. Vol. 14. Leiden & Boston: Brill. ISBN 9789004269286. OCLC 941915676.
- ———; Baert, Barbara; Demasure, Karlijn; Van Den Eynde, Sabine, eds. (2016). Noli me tangere in interdisciplinary perspective: textual, iconographic and contemporary interpretations. Bibliotheca Ephemeridum theologicarum Lovaniensium. Vol. 283. Leuven & Paris & Bristol, CT: Peeters, Press. ISBN 9789042933286. OCLC 953977366.
- ———; Verheyden, J.; Schröter, J.; Jäger, I., eds. (2018). Docetism in the Early Church: The Quest for an Elusive Phenomenon. Wissenschaftliche Untersuchungen zum Neuen Testament. Vol. 402. Tubingen: Mohr Siebeck. ISBN 9783161540844. OCLC 1030481400.

=== Articles and chapters ===
- ——— (1987). "2 Kor 5,19a und die Versöhnung der Welt". ETL. 63: 295–326.
- ——— (2007). "Women and Leadership in Romans 16: The Leading Roles of Phoebe, Prisca and Junia in Early Christianity". East Asian Pastoral Review. 44: 221–237, 316–336.
- ———; Hove, Isabelle Vanden (2007). "Mary Magdalene in the Four Gospels". Louvain Studies. 32 (3): 186–254. doi:10.2143/LS.32.3.2033414. - A shorter online version
- ——— (2011). "Reconciliation to God in the Light of 2 Corinthians 5:14-21". In Bieringer, Reimund; Bolton, David J. (eds.). Reconciliation in Interfaith Perspective: Jewish, Christian and Muslim Voices. Leuven: Peeters. pp. 39–58. ISBN 9789042923911. OCLC 727114129.
- ——— (2008). "'Reconcile Yourselves to God': An Unusual Interpretation of 2 Corinthians 5:20 in its Context". In Buitenwerf, R.; Hollander, H.; Tromp, J. (eds.). Jesus, Paul, and Early Christianity: Studies in Honour of Henk Jan de Jonge. Supplements to Novum Testamentum. Vol. 130. Leiden: Brill. pp. 11–38. ISBN 9789004170339. OCLC 243941624.
- ——— (2011). "Texts that Create a Future: The Function of Ancient Texts for Theology Today". In Leemans, Johan; Matz, Brian J.; Verstraeten, Johan (eds.). Reading Patristic Texts on Social Ethics: issues and challenges for twenty-first-century Christian social thought. CUA Studies in Early Christianity. Washington DC: The Catholic University of America Press. pp. 1–29. ISBN 9780813218595. OCLC 929426683.
- ——— (2013). "Divine-Human Reconciliation in 2 Cor 5:18-21 in its Interpersonal Context: The Contextual Meaning of the καταλλάσσω/καταλλαγή Terminology in 2 Corinthians". In Klumbies, Paul-Gerhard; du Toit, David S. (eds.). Paulus - Werk und Wirkung: Festschrift für Andreas Lindemann zum 70. Geburtstag. Tübingen: Mohr Siebeck, 2013. pp. 61–80. ISBN 9783161525803. OCLC 865469802.
- ——— (2014). "Love as That Which Binds Everything Together? The Unity of 2 Corinthians Revisited in Light of ἀγαπ-Terminology". In Bieringer, Reimund; Nathan, E.; Pollefeyt, Didier; Tomson, P. J. (eds.). Second Corinthians in the Perspective of Late Second Temple Judaism. Compendia Rerum Iudaicarum ad Novum Testamentum. Section 1. Vol. 14. Leiden & Boston: Brill. pp. 11–24. ISBN 9789004269286. OCLC 941915676.
- ——— (2016). "Ῥαββουνί in John 20,16 and Its Implications for Our Understanding of the Relationship between Mary Magdalene and Jesus". In Bieringer, Reimund; Baert, Barbara; Demasure, Karlijn (eds.). Noli me tangere in Interdisciplinary Perspective: Textual, Iconographic and Contemporary Interpretations. BETL. Vol. 283. Leuven: Peeters. pp. 3–42. ISBN 9789042933286. OCLC 987760677.
- ——— (2017). "Anti-Judaism and the Fourth Gospel Fifteen Years after the Leuven Colloquium". In Culpepper, R. Alan; Anderson, P. R.; Demasure, Karlijn (eds.). John and Judaism: A Contested Relationship in Context. Resources for Biblical Study. Vol. 87. Atlanta, GA: SBL Press. pp. 243–263. ISBN 9781628371864. OCLC 982090542.
- ——— (2018). "The Passion Narrative in the Gospel of John: A Hotbed of Docetism?". In Bieringer, Reimund; Verheyden, J.; Schröter, J.; Jäger, I. (eds.). Docetism in the Early Church: The Quest for an Elusive Phenomenon. Wissenschaftliche Untersuchungen zum Neuen Testament. Vol. 402. Tubingen: Mohr Siebeck. pp. 113–124. ISBN 9783161540844. OCLC 1030481400.
