= Lisa Cartwright =

Lisa Cartwright is a scholar and professor, best known for helping to found the field of visual culture studies and for co-authoring Practices of Looking with Marita Sturken, a widely translated visual studies textbook that is regarded as one of the first comprehensive books in the field after John Berger's Ways of Seeing. In Practices of Looking, Cartwright and Sturken examine the complexity of the relationship between viewers and objects in a variety of visual media ranging from film and photography to advertising, painting, and printmaking. They pay especially close attention to the historical, social, and psychological conditions that help to constitute "seeing" at any given moment.

Cartwright is also known for her work in feminist science and technology studies and disability studies. In her 1995 book Screening the Body, for example, she shows how technological and scientific developments in medical imaging converge with the popular and social imagination to "make the body visible in new ways". Here, among other things, she addresses how documentary imagery is produced and used for moralizing or spectacular ends, moves that undercut its supposedly scientific neutrality, and how "seeing" through medical optical instruments continues a displacement of direct sensory engagement that has been increasing since the Renaissance. Elsewhere, her essay on the Visible Human Project in The Visible Woman is cited as one that laid much of the groundwork for a critical examination of this large undertaking to create a complete set of cross-sectional photographs of the human body.

Cartwright is a professor emeritus in the departments of Visual Arts, Communication, Science Studies, and Critical Gender Studies at the University of California, San Diego. She was a founding member of the Graduate Program in Visual & Cultural Studies at the University of Rochester, where she taught from 1990 to 2002.

== Education ==
Cartwright attended New York University Tisch School of the Arts (BFA, Film and Television, 1982) and Yale University (PhD, American Studies, 1991). She took part in the Whitney Museum of American Art Independent Study Program in 1982.

== Publications ==
=== Books ===
- Screening the Body: Tracing Medicine's Visual Culture. University of Minnesota Press, 1995.
- The Visible Woman: Imaging Technologies, Gender and Science. Co-edited with Paula Treichler and Constance Penley. New York University Press, 1998.
- Moral Spectatorship: Technologies of Voice and Affect in Postwar Representations of the Child. Duke University Press, 2008.
- Practices of Looking: An Introduction to Visual Culture. Co-authored with Marita Sturken. Oxford University Press, 2008.

=== Journal articles and book chapters ===
- "A Cultural Anatomy of the Visible Human Project". In The Visible Woman: Imaging Technologies, Gender and Science, eds. Paula Treichler, Lisa Cartwright, and Constance Penley. New York University Press, 1998.
- "'Emergencies of Survival': Moral Spectatorship and the 'New Vision of the Child' in Postwar Child Psychoanalysis". Journal of Visual Culture 3:1 (2004).
- "On the Subject of Neural Prosthesis." Co-authored with Brian Goldfarb, in The Prosthetic Impulse: From a Posthuman Present to a Biocultural Future, eds. Joanne Morra and Marquard Smith. MIT Press, 2005.
- "Shame, Empathy and Looking Practices: Masked Woman in a Wheelchair in a Disability Studies Classroom". Co-authored with David Benin, Journal of Visual Culture 5:2 (2006).
- "Imagination, Multimodality and Embodied Interaction: A Discussion of Sound and Movement in Two Cases of Laboratory and Clinical Magnetic Resonance Imaging." Co-authored with Morana Alac, in Science Images and Popular Images of the Sciences, eds. Bernd Huppauf and Peter Weingart. Routledge, 2007.
- "Mandy (1952): On Voice and Listening in the (Deaf) Maternal Melodrama". In Medicine's Moving Pictures: Medicine, Health, and Bodies in American Film and Television, eds. Leslie J. Reagan, Nancy Tomes, and Paula A. Treichler. University of Rochester Press, 2008.
- "The Hands of the Animator: Rotoscopic Projection, Condensation, and Repetition Automatism in the Fleischer Apparatus". Body & Society 18:1 (2012).
- "How to Have Social Media in an Invisible Pandemic: Hepatitis C in the Time of H1N1". In Media Studies Futures, vol. 6, eds. Anghy Valdivia and Kelly A. Gates. Wiley-Blackwell, 2013.
- "Visual Science Studies: Always Already Materialist". In Visualisation in the Age of Computerization, eds. Annamaria Carusi, Aud Sissel Hoel, and Timothy Webmoor. Routledge, 2014.
