= W. J. T. Mitchell =

American academic (born 1942)

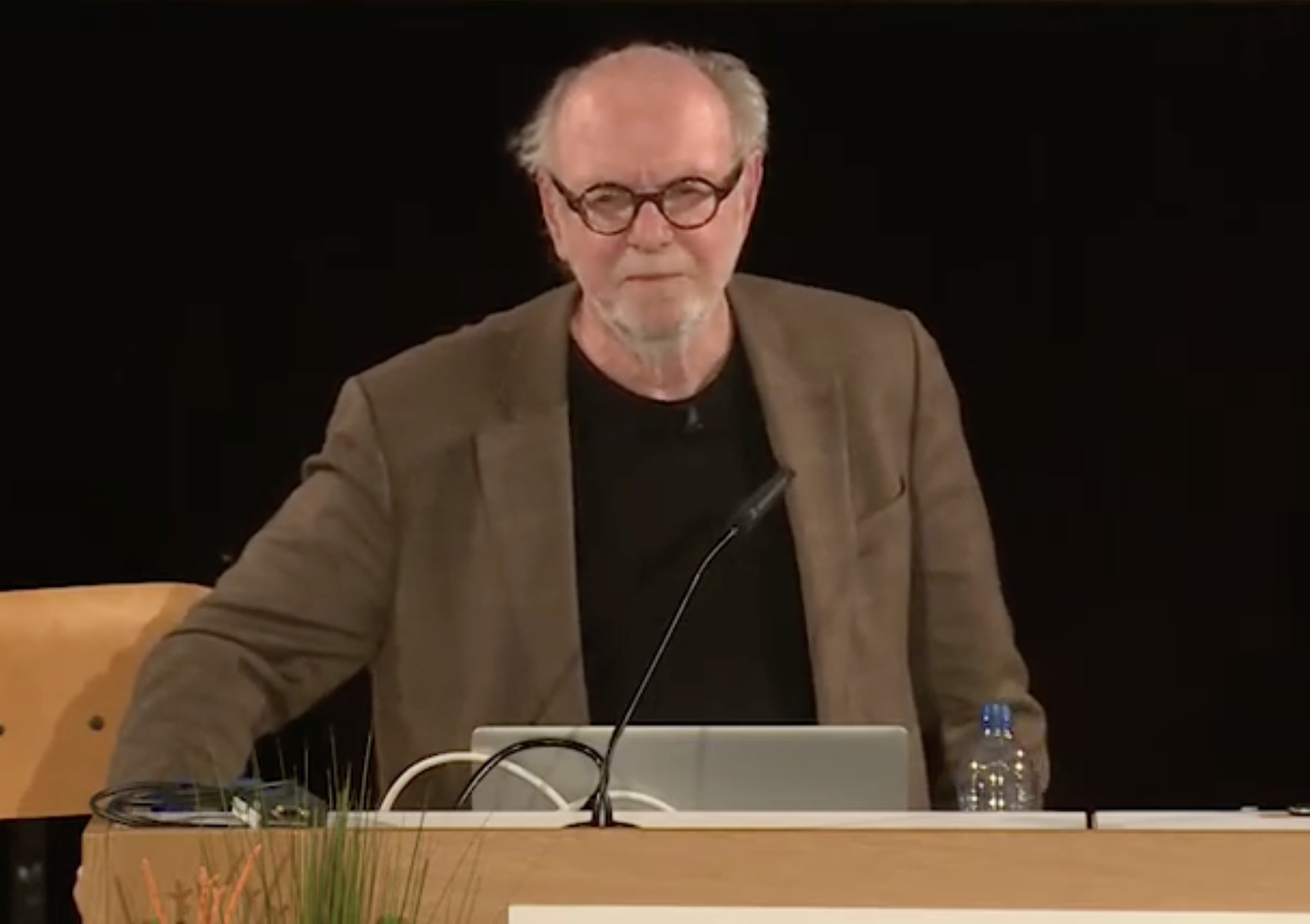
- Born: March 24, 1942 (age 84); Anaheim, California
- Occupations: Art historian, university professor
- Known for: Development of a picture theory within the field of visual culture and digital media research

Academic background
- Education: Michigan State University; Johns Hopkins University

Academic work
- Institutions: University of Chicago
- Main interests: Visual culture, media theory

William John Thomas Mitchell (born March 24, 1942) is an American scholar. Mitchell is the Gaylord Donnelley Distinguished Service Professor Emeritus of English and Art History at the University of Chicago. His research is focused on media theory, iconology, and the relations between different art forms, such as the verbal representation of visual art. He was the editor of Critical Inquiry for 42 years, from 1978 to 2020, and also contributed to numerous other journals, including the London Review of Books, Public Culture, the Los Angeles Review of Books, Times Literary Supplement, Art forum, and New Literary History. He is the author or editor of more than twenty books and the recipient of numerous awards and prizes, including lifetime achievement awards for literary criticism from the Modern Language Association of America and for art history from the College Art Association. The University of Chicago Press has awarded him its Gordon E. Laing Prize for the best book by a Chicago author twice: for ''Picture Theory'' (1995) and ''What Do Pictures Want?'' (2005).

Mitchell's monographs, Iconology (1986) and Picture Theory (1994), focus on media theory and visual culture. He draws on ideas from Sigmund Freud and Karl Marx, and the long history of philosophical reflections on images from Plato to Michel Foucault, exploring the uncanny resemblance between images and life-forms. His collection of essays What Do Pictures Want? (2005) won the Modern Language Association's prestigious James Russell Lowell Prize in 2005. In a recent podcast interview, Mitchell traces his interest in visual culture to his early work on William Blake, and his then burgeoning interest in developing a science of images that would breach the boundaries between science and the humanities. In that same interview, he discusses his ongoing efforts to rethink verbal and visual image forms in the age of social media and artificial intelligence.

In 2014, Mitchell was elected to the American Philosophical Society, He was elected to the American Academy of Arts and Sciences in 2017. He is a member of the British Academy, was awarded a Berlin Prize Fellowship by the American Academy in Berlin, and has a resident fellowship at the American Academy in Rome.

Mitchell has been noted as a supporter of the BDS campaign by Canary Mission. Mitchell has written on both Israeli and Palestinian filmmakers and has given invited lectures at Hebrew University, Bar-Ilan University, Tel Aviv University, the Bezalel Academy of Art, Birzeit University, the American University of Beirut, and the International Academy of Art Palestine.

== Early life and education ==
Mitchell was born on March 24, 1942. He received his B.A. from Michigan State University in 1963 and his M.A. and Ph.D. from Johns Hopkins University in 1968. He began his teaching career in the English Department at Ohio State University (1968–1977) before joining the University of Chicago in 1977. He served as Chair of the English Department from 1988 to 1991 and was appointed the Gaylord Donnelley Distinguished Service Professor of English and Art History. His research centers on the history and theories of media, visual art, and literature from the 18th century to the present, with a particular focus on the interplay between visual and verbal representation and the field of iconology.

== Intellectual contributions ==
Mitchell is credited with helping launch the interdisciplinary field of visual culture studies. His early work on William Blake led to an interest in developing a "science of images". He popularized the concept of the "pictorial turn" (echoing Richard Rorty’s notion of a “linguistic turn” in Western philosophy) and argues that pictures should be understood as "living things" with desires, needs, and agency, drawing on influences such as Freud and Marx. He was invited by Henry Louis Gates, Jr. to give the W.E.B. DuBois Lectures at Harvard University, subsequently published as Seeing through Race.

== Editorial leadership ==
Mitchell served as editor of the interdisciplinary journal ''Critical Inquiry'' for 42 years (1978–2020), succeeding Sheldon Sacks. Under his leadership, the journal broadened its scope to include critical theory across the arts and human sciences, publishing special issues on topics such as feminism, race and identity, public art, and postcolonial theory. It was described by ''The New York Times'' as "academe's most prestigious theory journal". The journal received multiple awards for outstanding special issues during its tenure. He also edited seven essay collections for the University of Chicago Press.

He stepped down in 2020 to focus on writing.

== Later work and public engagement ==
Recent books include the 2020 memoir Mental Traveler: A Father, a Son, and a Journey through Schizophrenia, reflecting on his son's 20-year struggle with schizophrenia. His spouse, composer Janice Misurell-Mitchell, is a poet who contributed poems to the book. His daughter is completing a film about her brother’s life, Gabriel’s Back Pages, which will be released in 2026. He has curated exhibitions (e.g., ''Metapictures'', 2018–2021 in Beijing and Chicago) and continues to lecture and publish on media, politics, and visual culture. In his numerous interviews, he discusses rethinking visual culture in the digital age and the role of images in politics and war. He has contributed to public discussions on mental illness as both an individual and collective affliction. His latest book, Seeing through Madness: Essays in Crazy Times, is forthcoming in the fall of 2026. He is currently developing the project, “The Academy in a State of Siege: Pictures of an Institution,” which he plans to expand into a book.

== Bibliography ==
=== Books ===
- Mental Traveler: A Father, a Son, and a Journey through Schizophrenia. Chicago, IL: U of Chicago P, 2020. ISBN 978-0-226-69593-8
- Image Science: Iconology, Visual Culture and Media Aesthetics. Chicago, IL: U of Chicago P, 2015. ISBN 978-0-226-23133-4
- Seeing Through Race. Cambridge, MA: Harvard UP, 2012. ISBN 9780674059818
- Cloning Terror: The War of Images, 9/11 to the Present. Chicago, IL: U of Chicago P, 2011. ISBN 978-0-226-53259-2
- With Mark B. N. Hansen. Critical Terms for Media Studies. Chicago, IL: U of Chicago P, 2010. ISBN 978-0-226-53254-7
- What Do Pictures Want?: The Lives and Loves of Images. Chicago, IL: U of Chicago P, 2005. ISBN 978-0-226-53245-5
- The Last Dinosaur Book: The Life and Times of a Cultural Icon. Chicago, IL: U of Chicago P, 1998. ISBN 978-0-226-53204-2
- Picture Theory: Essays on Verbal and Visual Representation. Chicago: U of Chicago P, 1994. ISBN 978-0-226-53232-5
- Iconology: Image, Text, Ideology. Chicago: U of Chicago P, 1986. pbk. ISBN 978-0-226-53229-5
- Against Theory: Literary Studies and the New Pragmatism. Chicago: U of Chicago P, 1985. pbk. ISBN 978-0-226-53227-1
- The Politics of Interpretation. Chicago: U of Chicago P, 1983. ISBN 978-0-226-53219-6
- On Narrative. Chicago: U of Chicago P, 1981. ISBN 978-0-226-53217-2 review: JSTOR 676084 from American Anthropologist
- The Language of Images. Chicago: U of Chicago P, 1980. pbk. ISBN 978-0-226-53215-8
- Blake's Composite Art: A Study of the Illuminated Poetry. Princeton: Princeton UP. 232 pp. 112 plates, 1978.

=== Essays and other short works ===
- Bhabha, Homi, and W. J. T. Mitchell. "Edward Said: Continuing the Conversation." Critical Inquiry 31, no. 2 (Winter, 2005): 365–529.
- Mitchell, W. J. T. "Edward Said: Continuing the Conversation." Critical Inquiry 31, no. 2 (Winter, 2005): 365–370.
- "Secular Divination: Edward Said's Humanism." Critical Inquiry 31, no. 2 (Winter, 2005): 462–471.
- "The Future of Criticism-A Critical Inquiry Symposium." Critical Inquiry 30, no. 2 (Winter, 2004): 324–483.
- "Romanticism and the Life of Things: Fossils, Totems, and Images." in Things., Edited by Bill Brown. Chicago, IL: U of Chicago P, 2004.
- "The Commitment to Form; Or, Still Crazy After all these Years." PMLA: Publications of the Modern Language Association of America 118, no. 2 (Mar, 2003): 321–325.
- "Remembering Edward Said." Chronicle of Higher Education 50, no. 7 (Oct 10, 2003): B10-B11.
- "The Serpent in the Wilderness: Space, Place, and Landscape in the Eighteenth Century." in Acts of Narrative., Edited by Carol Jacobs, Henry Sussman. Stanford, CA: Stanford UP, 2003.
- "The Work of Art in the Age of Biocybernetic Reproduction." Modernism/Modernity 10, no. 3 (Sept, 2003): 481–500.
- "Showing Seeing: A Critique of Visual Culture". In: Michael Ann Holly and Keith Moxey (eds.), Art History, Aesthetics, Visual Studies. Clark Art Institute and Yale University Press, 2002: 231–250.
- "911: Criticism and Crisis." Critical Inquiry 28, no. 2 (Winter, 2002): 567–572.
- "The Surplus Value of Images." Mosaic: A Journal for the Interdisciplinary Study of Literature 35, no. 3 (Sept, 2002): 1-23.
- "Romanticism and the Life of Things: Fossils, Totems, and Images." Critical Inquiry 28, no. 1 (Autumn, 2001): 167–184.
- "Seeing Disability." Public Culture 13, no. 3 [35] (Fall, 2001): 391–397.
- "Holy Landscape: Israel, Palestine, and the American Wilderness." Critical Inquiry 26, no. 2 (Winter, 2000): 193–223.
- "La Plus-Value Des Images." Etudes Littéraires 32–33, no. 3-1 (Autumn-2001 Winter, 2000): 201–225.
- "The Panic of the Visual: A Conversation with Edward W. Said." in Edward Said and the Work of the Critic: Speaking Truth to Power., Edited by Paul A. Bové. Durham, NC: Duke UP, 2000.
- "The Panic of the Visual: A Conversation with Edward W. Said." Boundary 2: An International Journal of Literature and Culture 25, no. 2 (Summer, 1998): 11–33.
- "The Romantic Education of W. J. T. Mitchell." in U of Maryland, College Park, MD Pagination: 34 Paragraphs., Edited by Wang, Orrin N. C. (ed.), The Last Formalist, or W.J.T. Mitchell as Romantic Dinosaur 1997.
- "The Violence of Public Art: Do the Right Thing." in Spike Lee's do the Right Thing., Edited by Mark A. Reid. Cambridge, England: Cambridge UP, 1997.
- "Chaosthetics: Blake's Sense of Form." Huntington Library Quarterly: Studies in English and American History and Literature 58, no. 3-4 (1996): 441–458.
- "Visible Language: Blake's Wond'Rous Art of Writing." in William Blake., Edited by David Punter. New York: St. Martin's, 1996.
- "What do Pictures really Want?" October 77, (Summer, 1996): 71–82.
- "Why Comparisons are Odious." World Literature Today: A Literary Quarterly of the University of Oklahoma 70, no. 2 (Spring, 1996): 321–324.
- Amrine, Frederick, Martha Banta, Antoine Compagnon, Heather Dubrow, James D. Fernández, Sue Houchins, and W. J. T. Mitchell, et al. "The Status of Evidence: A Roundtable." PMLA: Publications of the Modern Language Association of America 111, no. 1 (Jan, 1996): 21–31.
- "Postcolonial Culture, Postimperial Criticism." in The Post-Colonial Studies Reader., Edited by Bill Ashcroft, Gareth Griffiths and Helen Tiffin. London: Routledge, 1995.
- "Narrative, Memory, and Slavery." in Cultural Artifacts and the Production of Meaning: The Page, the Image, and the Body., Edited by Margaret J. M. Ezell, Katherine O'Brien O'Keeffe. Ann Arbor, MI: U of Michigan P, 1994.
- "Ekphrasis and the Other." South Atlantic Quarterly 91, no. 3 (Summer, 1992): 695–719.
- "Postcolonial Culture, Postimperial Criticism." Transition 56, (1992): 11–19.
- "Iconology and Ideology: Panofsky, Althusser, and the Scene of Recognition." in Image and Ideology in Modern/Postmodern Discourse., Edited by David B. Downing, Susan Bazargan. Albany: State U of New York P, 1991.
- "Against Comparison: Teaching Literature and the Visual Arts." in Teaching Literature and Other Arts., Edited by Jean-Pierre Barricelli, Joseph Gibaldi and Estella Lauter. New York: Mod. Lang. Assn. of Amer., 1990.
- "Influence, Autobiography, and Literary History: Rousseau's Confessions and Wordsworth's the Prelude." ELH 57, no. 3 (Fall, 1990): 643–664.
- "Essays Toward a New Art History." Critical Inquiry 15, no. 2 (Winter, 1989): 226–406.
- "Image and Text in Songs." in Approaches to Teaching Blake's Songs of Innocence and of Experience., Edited by Robert F. Gleckner, Mark L. Greenberg. New York: Mod. Lang. Assn. of Amer., 1989.
- "Space, Ideology, and Literary Representation." Poetics Today 10, no. 1 (Spring, 1989): 91-102.
- "Tableau and Taboo: The Resistance to Vision in Literary Discourse." CEA Critic: An Official Journal of the College English Association 51, no. 1 (Fall, 1988): 4-10.
- "Wittgenstein's Imagery and what it Tells Us." New Literary History: A Journal of Theory and Interpretation 19, no. 2 (Winter, 1988): 361–370.
- "How Good is Nelson Goodman?" Poetics Today 7, no. 1 (1986): 111–115.
- "Visible Language: Blake's Wond'Rous Art of Writing." in Romanticism and Contemporary Criticism., Edited by Morris Eaves, Michael Fischer. Ithaca: Cornell UP, 1986.
- "The Politics of Genre: Space and Time in Lessing's Laocoon." Representations 6, (Spring, 1984): 98-115.
- "What is an Image?" New Literary History: A Journal of Theory and Interpretation 15, no. 3 (Spring, 1984): 503–537.
- "Metamorphoses of the Vortex: Hogarth, Turner, and Blake." in Articulate Images: The Sister Arts from Hogarth to Tennyson., Edited by Richard Wendorf. Minneapolis: U of Minnesota P, 1983.
- "Critical Inquiry and the Ideology of Pluralism." Critical Inquiry 8, no. 4 (Summer, 1982): 609–618.
- "Dangerous Blake." Studies in Romanticism 21, no. 3 (Fall, 1982): 410–416.
- "How Original was Blake?" Blake: An Illustrated Quarterly 14, (-1981, 1980): 116–120.
- "The Language of Images." Critical Inquiry 6, no. 3 (Spring, 1980): 359–567.
- "On Narrative." Critical Inquiry 7, no. 1 (Fall, 1980): 1–236.
- "Spatial Form in Literature: Toward a General Theory." Critical Inquiry 6, no. 3 (Spring, 1980): 539–567.
- "Critical Inquiry After Sheldon Sacks." Bulletin of the Midwest Modern Language Association 12, no. 1 (Spring, 1979): 32–36.
- "On Sheldon Sacks." Critical Inquiry 6, no. 2 (Winter, 1979): 181–229.
- "Style as Epistemology: Blake and the Movement Toward Abstraction in Romantic Art." Studies in Romanticism 16, (1977): 145–164.
- Mitchell, W. J. T., and Gerald Graff. "Intellectual Politics and the Malaise of the Seventies." Salmagundi 47–48, (1980): 67–77.
- Mitchell, W. J. T., and Paul Hernadi. "On Narrative."
- Mitchell, W. J. T., and Winfried Menninghaus. "Angelus Novus: Perspectives on Walter Benjamin." Critical Inquiry 25, no. 2 (Winter, 1999).
- Mitchell, W. J. T., Louis A. Renza, and (reply). "Going Too Far with the Sister Arts." in Space, Time, Image, Sign: Essays on Literature and the Visual Arts., Edited by James A. W. Heffernan. New York: Peter Lang, 1987.
- Mitchell, W. J. T., and Gabriele Schabacher. "Der Mehrwert Von Bildern." in Die Addresse Des Mediums., Edited by Stefan Andriopoulos, Gabriele Schabacher, Eckhard Schumacher, Bernhard Dotzler, Erhard Schüttpelz and Georg Stanitzek. Cologne, Germany: DuMont, 2001.
- Mitchell, W. J. T., and Nadine Strossen. "A Resounding Rock in Flight." Chronicle of Higher Education 47, no. 12 (Nov 17, 2000): B4.
- Mitchell, W. J. T., and Ilse Utz. "Postkoloniale Kultur, Postimperiale Kritik." Neue Rundschau 107, no. 1 (1996): 20–25.
- Mitchell, W. J. T., Orrin N. C. Wang, and (interview and gloss). "An Interview with Orrin N. C. Wang." in U of Maryland, College Park, MD Pagination: 22 Paragraphs., Edited by Wang, Orrin N. C. (ed.), The Last Formalist, or W.J.T. Mitchell as Romantic Dinosaur 1997.
- Surette, Leon, and W. J. T. Mitchell. "Rational Form in Literature." Critical Inquiry 7, no. 3 (Spring, 1981): 612–621.

=== Edited Volumes ===
- ''W. J. T. Mitchell’s Image Theory: Living Pictures'', edited by Krešimir Purgar (London and New York: Routledge, 2016).
- ''A Képek Politikája: W. J. T. Mitchell válogatott írásai'' [The Politics of Pictures: Selected Writings], edited by Szőnyi György Endre and Szauter Dóra. Hungarian translation/reader of collected essays (Szeged: JATE Press, 2008).
- ''Landscape and Power'', edited by W. J. T. Mitchell (Chicago: University of Chicago Press, 1994; 2nd revised and enlarged edition with a new preface, 2002).
- ''Occupy: Three Inquiries in Disobedience'', with Michael Taussig and Bernard Harcourt (Chicago: University of Chicago Press, 2013).
- ''The Pictorial Turn'', edited by Neal Curtis (London and New York: Routledge, 2010).

== See also ==
- List of thinkers influenced by deconstruction
