= Jan Lambrecht (New Testament scholar) =

Belgian Catholic priest (1926–2023)

Jan Lambrecht (23 April 1926 – 4 March 2023) was a Belgian Catholic priest of the Society of Jesus, Professor Emeritus of New Testament and Biblical Greek at the Faculty of Theology and Religious Studies, KU Leuven, Belgium and a member of the Pontifical Biblical Commission. As a theologian, biblical scholar, and prolific author, he contributed numerous studies on almost all the books of the New Testament, but focused especially on the Gospels and the Pauline letters. His publications included books and articles written in English, Dutch, and French.

== Early life and education ==
Lambrecht was born in Wielsbeke on 23 April 1926. He joined the Society of Jesus in 1945. He received a licentiate in Philosophy in 1952 from Nijmegen, and in 1960, in Theology (STL) from the Jesuit Faculty in Leuven. He also held a licentiate in Eastern History and Languages from the Catholic University of Leuven (1959). In 1965, he was awarded a doctorate in Sacred Scripture (DSS) at the Pontifical Biblical Institute in Rome.

== Academic career ==
Following his return from Rome in 1965, Jan Lambrecht first taught the New Testament at the Jesuit Faculty in Leuven. But in 1968, when the Flemish Faculty of Theology (Faculteit Godgeleerdheid) was created after the Catholic University of Leuven had split into the Dutch speaking Katholieke Universiteit Leuven and the French speaking Université Catholique de Louvain, he joined the newly formed Flemish Faculty. He remained there as Professor of New Testament and Biblical Greek until his retirement in 1990. Between 1985 and 1990, he served as the dean of the Faculty of Theology.

After his retirement from Leuven, he was a visiting professor at the Biblical Institute in Rome (1995–2000), at the major seminary of Pretoria (2001–2003), at the Loyola University in New Orleans (2007–2009), and at Le Moyne College in Syracuse (2009–2010).

Lambrecht was also a member of the Pontifical Biblical Commission for two terms (1985–1995), and was part of the group which prepared the commission's influential document on "The Interpretation of the Bible in the Church."

== Death ==
Lambrecht died on 4 March 2023, at the age of 96.

== Selected works ==
- Lambrecht, Jan (1967). Die Redaktion der Markus-Apokalypse. Literarische Analyse und Strukturuntersuchung. Analecta Biblica. Vol. 28. Rome: Päpstliches Bibelinstitut. OCLC 688390.
- ——— (1992). Out of the Treasure. The Parables in the Gospel of Matthew. Louvain theological & pastoral monographs. Vol. 10. Leuven: Leuven University Press - Peeters Press. ISBN 9789068311617. OCLC 26245941.
- ———; Bieringer, Reimund (1994). Studies on 2 Corinthians. Bibliotheca Ephemeridum Theologicarum Lovaniensium. Vol. 112. Leuven: Leuven University Press - Peeters Press. ISBN 9789061866121. OCLC 35796326.
- ——— (1994). Pauline Studies: collected essays. Bibliotheca Ephemeridum Theologicarum Lovaniensium. Vol. 115. Leuven: Leuven University Press - Peeters Press. ISBN 9789061866237. OCLC 31433309.
- ——— (2001). Collected Studies on Pauline Literature and on the Book of Revelation. Analecta Biblica. Vol. 147. Rome: Editrice Pontificio Istituto Biblico. ISBN 9788876531477. OCLC 47067982.
- ——— (2003). Koperski, Veronica (ed.). Understanding What One Reads: New Testament Essays. Annua Nuntia Lovaniensia. Vol. 46. Leuven & Dudley, MA: Peeters Press. ISBN 9789042913028. OCLC 51818487.
- ——— (1999). Second Corinthians. Sacra Pagina. Vol. 8. Collegeville, MN: Liturgical Press. ISBN 9780814658109. OCLC 39256282. - second edition in 2006 with added bibliography.
- ——— (2011). Koperski, Veronica (ed.). Understanding What One Reads II: Essays on the Gospels and Paul. Annua Nuntia Lovaniensia. Vol. 64. Leuven & Dudley, MA: Peeters Press. ISBN 9789042925311. OCLC 773047136.
- ——— (2015). Koperski, Veronica (ed.). Understanding What One Reads III: Essays on the Gospels and Paul. Annua Nuntia Lovaniensia. Vol. 71. Leuven & Dudley, MA: Peeters Press. ISBN 9789042931718. OCLC 907631447.
