= Sturken =

Sturken is a surname. Notable people with the surname include:

- Carl Sturken, American songwriter and record producer
- Marita Sturken (born 1957), American scholar, author, and critic
