= Sally M. Promey =

American art historian (born 1957)

Chair of the University of Maryland, College Park Department of Art History and Archaeology
- In office July 2005 – December 2006

Personal details
- Born: February 22, 1953 (age 73) Medina, Ohio, U.S.
- Spouse: Roger Fallot
- Education: Hiram College; Yale Divinity School; University of Chicago
- Occupation: Art historian
- Awards: Member of the American Antiquarian Society (2002); Guggenheim Fellowship (2005)

Academic background
- Thesis: Spiritual spectacles: Shaker gift images in religious context (1988)

Academic work
- Discipline: Art history
- Sub-discipline: Relations between American religion and art
- Institutions: Northwestern University; University of Maryland, College Park; Yale Divinity School

Sally M. Promey (born February 22, 1953) is an American art historian. She worked in the faculty of Northwestern University and University of Maryland, College Park, where she was chair of the Department of Art History and Archaeology, before becoming Caroline Washburn Professor of Religion and Visual Culture at Yale Divinity School. A 2002 elected member of the American Antiquarian Society and 2005 Guggenheim Fellow, she specializes in relations between American religion and art, and she has authored books like Spiritual Spectacles (1993) and Painting Religion in Public (1999) and edited volumes like The Visual Culture of American Religions (2001) and Sensational Religion (2014).

== Biography ==
Sally M. Promey was born on February 22, 1953, in Medina, Ohio, one of three children of Pearl Marcia (née Miller) and computer programmer, United States Postal Service courier, and farm worker George Herman Louis Promenschenkel. After attending Medina High School, she obtained her BA (1975) in art history and religious studies at Hiram College, her MDiv in the visual arts and religion (1978) at Yale Divinity School, and her PhD (1988) in cultural history at the University of Chicago; her dissertation was named Spiritual spectacles: Shaker gift images in religious context.

After working as an art history lecturer at the Northwestern University Department of Art History since 1989, she moved to the University of Maryland, College Park Department of Art History and Archaeology in 1991, where she was promoted from assistant professor to associate professor in 1997 and full professor in 2000 and was chair from July 2005 until December 2006. In 2007, she returned to Yale as Caroline Washburn Professor of Religion and Visual Culture. She also founded the Center for the Study of Material and Visual Cultures of Religion at Yale.

She specializes in relations between American religion and art. She won the 1994 Charles C. Eldredge Prize for her book Spiritual Spectacles. She won the 2000 American Academy of Religion Book Award in Historical Studies for her next book Painting Religion in Public. In April 2002, she was elected to the American Antiquarian Society. In 2005, she was awarded a Guggenheim Fellowship. for "a study of the public display of religion in the United States"; this would later be used for her 2024 book Religion in Plain View. She also served as editor of the volumes The Visual Culture of American Religions (2001), American Religious Liberalism (2012), and Sensational Religion (2014), in the case of the first two as co-editor with David Morgan and Leigh Schmidt. She was also a 1993–1994 and 2003–2004 Ailsa Mellon Bruce Senior Fellow at the National Gallery of Art and a 2000–2001 Woodrow Wilson International Center for Scholars Fellow.

She is married to Roger Fallot, a psychologist who has worked as Director of Research and Evaluation at Washington metropolitan area non-profit Community Connections, and they have one child.

== Bibliography ==
- Spiritual Spectacles (1993)
- Painting Religion in Public (1999)
- (ed. with David Morgan) The Visual Culture of American Religions (2001)
- (ed. with Leigh Schmidt) American Religious Liberalism (2012)
- (ed.) Sensational Religion (2014)
- Religion in Plain View (2024)
