= The Aesthetic Contract =

1997 work by Henry Sussman

- Author: Henry Sussman
- Cover artist: Albrecht Dürer, Portrait of Hieronymus Holzschuher - 1526
- Language: English
- Published: 1997
- Publisher: Stanford University Press
- Publication place: United States
- Media type: Print
- Pages: 336 pages
- ISBN: 0804728429
- OCLC: 36589965

The Aesthetic Contract is a work of intellectual history and critical theory by Yale professor Henry Sussman, first published in 1997 by Stanford University Press.

== Synopsis ==
In the book Sussman traces intellectual enterprise, art, and artistic conventions since what he calls the "broader modernity" (marked by the end of the medieval period in Europe) and suggests that art and its conventions have essentially become a secular institution that have essentially replaced the moral allegiances the subject owed to the Church before the reformation increasing a sense of personal freedom.

== Reception ==
Critical reception for The Aesthetic Contract has been positive. In a review in The Comparatist David Halliburton wrote "In sum, The Aesthetic Contract is a strong, broad comparative study of major patterns in the modernity of the West from the time of the Protestant Reformation to our own, soon-to-expire, century." A reviewer for Studies in Romanticism praised Sussman for the book's "steadfast refusal to sacrifice a genuine intellectual undertaking for such efficacity". Academic Geoffrey Galt Harpham was more mixed in his review, as he wrote that the "rhetoric of terror notwithstanding, The Aesthetic Contract displays perhaps an excessive ease, an unresisted 'liberty'", while also stating "Can any such set of understandings or conventions as general as the ones Sussman imagines be conjured in terms that would be both useful and suggestive? Perhaps not. But the effort to bring into being, by sheer force of discourse, a shadowy but defining--what do we call it?--commands a certain respect; and the very incompleteness of the project may yet provoke further efforts, by Sussman and others."
