= Barbara Baert =

Belgian art historian and professor

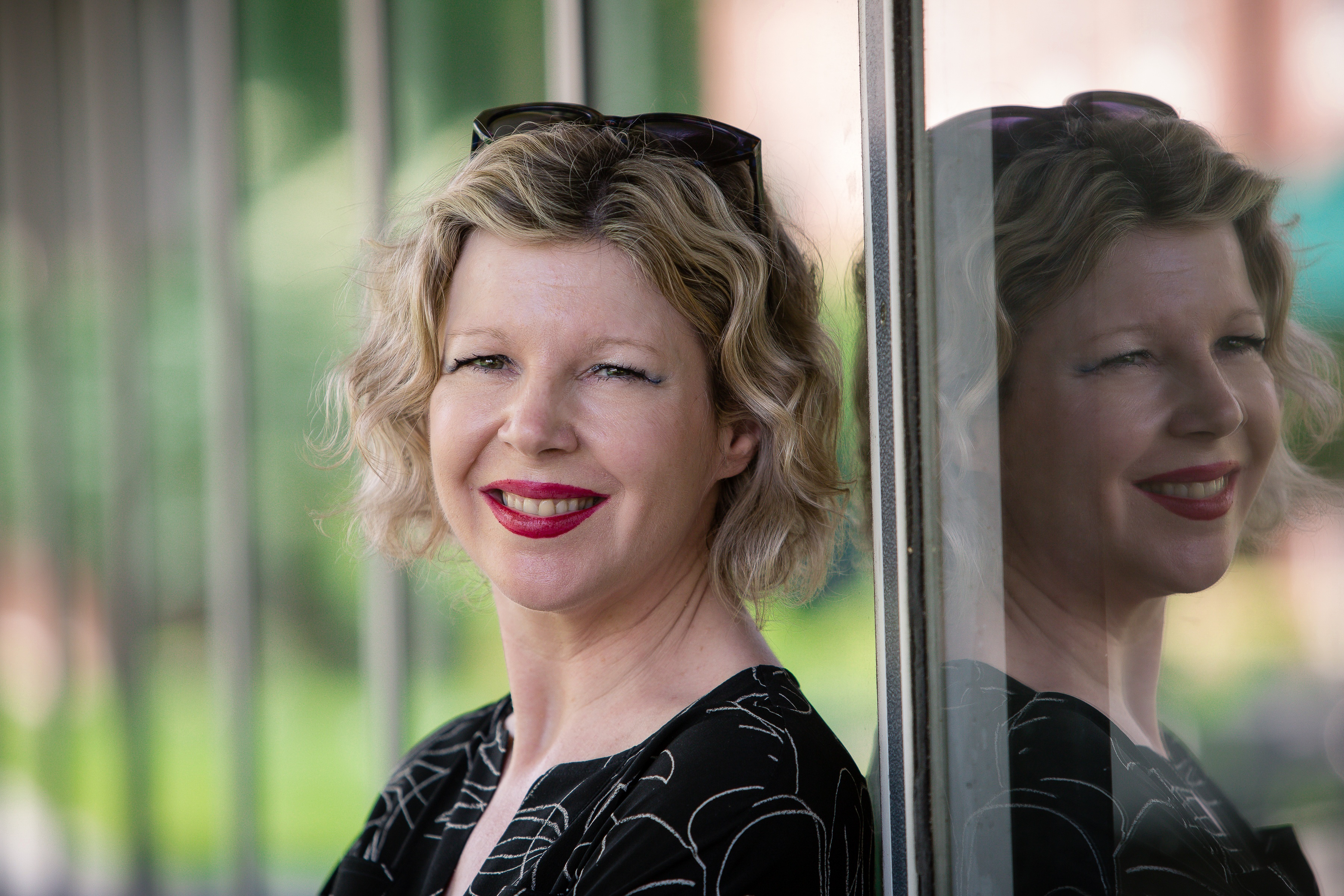
- Born: 1967 (age 58–59); Turnhout, Antwerp, Belgium
- Education: Katholieke Universiteit Leuven
- Known for: Looking Into the Rain: Magic - Moisture - Medium (2022); Pneuma and the Visual Arts in the Middle Ages and Early Modernity, (Art and Religion, 5) (2016)
- Awards: Commander of the Order of Léopold; Francqui Prize for Human Sciences and other professional awards and prizes
- Scientific career
- Fields: Art history (iconology; art theory & analysis; medieval art)
- Workplaces: Katholieke Universiteit Leuven
- Thesis: Een erfenis van heilig hout of de neerslag van het teruggevonden kruis in tekst en beeld tijdens de Middeleeuwen: een iconologische studie van de Kruislegende (1997)
- Doctoral advisor: Maurits Smeyers
- Website: https://www.kuleuven.be/wieiswie/en/person/00004564

Barbara Baert (born 1967) is a Belgian art historian and professor of art history as well as a fellow at the Illuminare – Center for Medieval and Renaissance Art at KU Leuven (the Catholic University of Louvain). She is the founder of the Iconology Research Group, an international and interdisciplinary platform dedicated to the study of image interpretation.

Baert has received numerous awards and prizes in her field such as the Francqui Prize for Human Sciences, as well as the Commander of the Order of Léopold, Belgium's oldest and highest order.

== Early life ==
Baert was born in Turnhout, Antwerp, in Belgium in 1967. She studied at Katholieke Universiteit Leuven (KU Leuven), obtaining a doctoral degree in 1997 with her research on the True Cross that was later published in Englishin 2004 under the title A Heritage of Holy Wood: The Legend of the True Cross in Text and Image.

== Career ==
Baert is affiliated as a research fellow with the Illuminare – Center for Medieval and Renaissance Art at KU Leuven), where she also teaches in the fields of iconology, art theory and analysis, and medieval art. In 2006, she founded the Iconology Research Group, an international and interdisciplinary platform for the study of the interpretation of images promoting collaboration among three visual research traditions that pursue similar goals but often follow separate—usually national—trajectories: visual anthropology, Bildwissenschaft (approximately, image-science), and iconology.

Baert is also editor-in-chief of three peer-reviewed journals: Studies in Iconology (Peeters Publishers), Art and Religion (also Peeters Publishers), and Iconologies (ASP Editions).

She has directed several international research programmes, including:

- Mary Magdalene and the Touching of Jesus, an intra- and interdisciplinary investigation of the interpretation of John 20:17, sponsored by the Fund for Scientific Research, Flanders, Belgium (2004–2008)
- The Woman with the Hemorrhage (Matthew 9:20-22; Mark 5:24-34; Luke 8:42b-48), an iconological study of the interpretation of the Haemorrhoissa in medieval art (4th-15th century), funded by the KU Leuven (2008–2012)
- Caput Ioanis in Disco (Latin for Head of John on a Platter). Object-medium-function, Fonds Wetenschappelijk Onderzoek (Scientific Research Fund), KU Leuven en Universität Wien (University of Vienna) (2012–2016)
- Ornamenta sacra (Latin for Sacred Ornaments). Iconology of liturgical objects (2017–2021) (Belspo-Brain-be, UC Louvain and the Royal Institute for Cultural Heritage
- Kairós, or the Right Moment. Nachleben (German for Afterlife) and iconology (2017–2022) (KU Leuven)

Baert is also a member of the editorial board of Brepols–Series IKON Studies and La rivista di engramma (The Engram Magazine) (open access).

== Prizes and awards ==
Baert was honoured twice by the Royal Flemish Academy of Belgium for Science and the Arts (Koninklijke Vlaamse Academie van België voor Wetenschappen en Kunsten): in 1993 for her outstanding thesis in art history entitled Het Boec van den Houte (The Book of the Wood) and in 2006 for her outstanding scientific career before the age of 40. In 2016, she was honoured with the Pioneer's Award of the KU Leuven as well as the Francqui Prize by the Francqui Foundation (Francqui-Stichting) for her pioneering work in iconology and medieval visual culture, awarded annually to a scientist associated with a Belgian academic institution and also under the age of 50 at the start of the year of winning the prize.

Since January 2014, she has been a life member of the Royal Flemish Academy of Belgium for Science and the Arts. She is also a member of the Academia Europaea, a pan-European academy of humanities, letters, law, and sciences. Between April and September 2015, she held a fellowship at the International Research Institute for Cultural Techniques and Media Philosophy (Internationale Kolleg für Kulturtechnikforschung und Medienphilosophie) in Weimar, Germany.

In 2017, Baert received the honour of Commander of the Order of Léopold, Belgium's oldest and highest order. In 2019, she became a member in residence of the Institute for Advanced Study in Princeton, New Jersey and in 2020, a fellow at the Berlin Center for Advanced Studies BildEvidenz. In 2021 she gave the James Loeb Lecture at the Central Institute for Art History (Zentralinstitut für Kunstgeschichte) in Munich, Germany, on 'How Kairos transformed into Occasio (Grisaille [a painting technique], School of Mantegna, 1495–1510)', about the Kairos/Occasio motif. With her paper on the same motif, she offered the first complete status quaestionis (state of investigation) on the meanings attributed to grisaille from the first hypothesis of Aby Warburg (1866–1929) to the present.

In 2023, Baert became a professor at the Warburg House, Hamburg (Warburg Haus), a German art and history forum. In 2024, she was asked to give a lecture as part of the Dahlem Humanities Center Lectures programme at the Free University of Berlin (Freie Universität Berlin), and the same year was made a visiting professor at the André Chastel Center – University of the Sorbonne (Centre André Chastel – Université de Sorbonne) in Paris at the invitation of Stéphane Toussaint.

== Publications (selection) ==
- B. Baert, A Heritage of Holy Wood: The Legend of the True Cross in Text and Image, Leiden: Brill, 2004.
- B. Baert, "The Gaze in the Garden. Noli me tangere and embodiment in the 15th century Netherlands and Rhineland", in Body and Embodiment. Nederlands kunsthistorisch Jaarboek, 2007, pp. 37–61.
- B. Baert, "Touching the Hem. The Thread between Garment and Blood in the Story of the Woman with the Hemorrhage (Mark 5:24b-34parr)", in Das Kleid der Bilder, eds. Marius Rimmele & David Ganz (Textile Studies, 4), Konstanz-Zürich, 2012, pp. 159–182.
- B. Baert, Interspaces between Word, Gaze and Touch. The Bible and the Visual Medium in the Middle Ages. Collected essays on Noli me tangere, the Woman with the Haemorrhage, the Head of John the Baptist (Annua Nuntia Lovaniensia, LXII), Leuven: Peeters, 2011. (ISBN 978 90 429 2399 7)
- B. Baert, Caput Joannis in Disco. Essay on a Man's Head (Visualising the Middle Ages VMA 8), Leiden: Brill, 2012. (ISBN 978-9004-22411-7)
- B. Baert, L. Kusters and E. Sidgwick, "An issue of blood. The healing of the woman with the Haemorrhage (Mark 5.24B-34, Luke 8.42B-48, Matthew 9.19-22) in early medieval visual culture", in Blood, Sweat and Tears - The Changing Concepts of Physiology from Antiquity into Early Modern Europe, ed. M. Horstmanshoff (Intersections. Interdisciplinary Studies in early modern Culture, 25), Leiden: Brill, 2012, pp. 307–338.
- B. Baert, "Adam, Seth and Jerusalem. The Legend of the Wood of the Cross in Medieval Literature and Iconography", in Adam, le premier home (Micrologus' Library, 45), Firenze (Sislem), 2012, pp. 69–99.
- B. Baert, Ann-Sophie Lehmann & Jenke van der Akkerveken, New Perspectives in Iconology: Visual Studies and Anthropology (Iconologies) Brussels (AspEditions), 2012. (ISBN 978 90 5487 975 6)
- B. Baert, "The Johannesschüssel as Andachtsbild. The Gaze, the Medium and the Senses", in Disembodied Heads in Medieval and Early Modern Culture, ed. Catrien Santing, B. Baert & Anita Traninger (Intersections. Interdisciplinary Studies in early modern Culture, 28), Leiden: Brill, 2013, pp. 117–160. (ISBN 978-90-0425-354-4)
- B. Baert, Late Mediaeval Enclosed Gardens of the Low Countries: Contributions to Gender and Artistic Expression (Studies in Iconology 2), Leuven: Peeters, 2015. (ISBN 978-90-429-3233-3)
- B. Baert, Pneuma and the Visual arts in the Middle Ages and early Modernity (Art&Religion 5), Leuven-Walpole (Peeters), 2016. (ISBN 978-90-429-3250-0)
- B. Baert, "Pentecost and the Senses. A Hermeneutical Contribution to the Visual Medium and the Sensorium in Early Medieval Manuscript Tradition", in Preaching after Easter, eds. Johan Leemans & Rich Bishop, Leiden: Brill, 2016, pp. 346–370.
- B. Baert, Kairos or Occasion as Paradigm in the Visual Medium. Nachleben, Iconography, Hermeneutics Leuven: Peeters, 2016. (ISBN 978 90 429 3379 8)
- B. Baert, In Response to Echo. Beyond Mimesis or Dissolution as Scopic Regime (with Special Attention to Camouflage) (Studies in Iconology, 6), Leuven-Walpole, 2016. (ISBN 978-90-429-3346-0)
- B. Baert, Revisiting Salome's Dance in Medieval and Early Modern Iconology (Studies in Iconology, 7), Leuven-Walpole, 2016. (ISBN 978-90-429-3428-3)
- B. Baert, "Stains. Trace-Cloth-Symptom", in Textile. Journal of Cloth and Culture, 15, 3, 2017, pp. 270–291.
- B. Baert, About Stains or the Image as Residue (Studies in Iconology, 10), Leuven-Walpole, 2017. (ISBN 978-90-429-3346-0)
- B. Baert, "Marble and the Sea or Echo Emerging. (A Ricercar)", in Treasures of the sea. Art or Craft, ed. Avinoam Shalem, Espacio, (Tiempo y Forma, Serie VII, Historia del Arte, 5) 2017, pp. 35–54.
- B. Baert, "He or she who glimpses, desires, is wounded. A dialogue in the interspace between Aby Warburg and Georges Didi-Huberman", in Angelaki. Journal of the Theoretical Humanities, 23, 4, 2018, pp. 47–79.
- B. Baert, What about Enthusiasm? A Rehabilitation. Pentecost, Pygmalion, Pathosformel (Studies in Iconology, 13), Leuven-Walpole, 2018. (ISBN 978-90-429-3673-7)
- B. Baert, "Fragments" (Studies in Iconology, 14), ed. S. Heremans, Leuven-Walpole, 2018. (ISBN 978-90-429-3724-6)
- B. Baert, Interruptions & Transitions. Essays on the Senses in Medieval and early Modern Visual Culture (Art and Material Culture in Medieval and Renaissance Europe, 14), Leiden, 2018. (ISBN 978-90-04-39052-2)
- B. Baert, About Sieves and Sieving. Motif, Symbol, Technique, Paradigm, Berlin, 2019. (ISBN 978-3-11-060614-0)
- B. Baert, De uil in de grot. Gesprekken met beelden, kunstenaars en schrijvers, Antwerp, 2019. (ISBN 978-94-6337-088-2)
- B. Baert, The Weeping Rock. Revisiting Niobe through Paragone, Pathosformel and Petrification (Studies in Iconology, 17), Leuven-Walpole, 2020. (ISBN 9789042942028)
- B. Baert, Signed PAN. Erwin Panofsky's (1892-1968) "The History of Art as a Humanistic Discipline"(Princeton, 1938) (Studies in Iconology, 18), Leuven-Walpole-Paris-Bristol, 2020. (ISBN 9789042943056)
- B. Baert, "Noli me tangere in the Codex Egberti (Reichenau, c. 977-93) and in the Gospel-Book of Otto III (Reichenau, 998-1000): Visual Exegesis in Context," in Illuminating the Middle Ages: Tributes to Prof. John Lowden, eds. Laura Cleaver, Alixe Bovey, Leiden, 2020, pp. 36–5.
- B. Baert, "Afterlife Studies and the Occasio Grisaille in Mantua (School of Mantegna, 1495-1510)," in Ikon, 13, 2020, pp. 95–108.
- B. Baert, "Life is Short, Art is Long, Crisis is Fleeting, Kairos or Weaving the Right Moment," in Textile. Journal of Cloth and Culture, 2020, pp. 1–23
- The Right Moment. Essays offered to Barbara Baert, Laureate of the 2016 Francqui Prize in Human Sciences, on the Occasion of the Celebratory Symposium at the Francqui Foundation, Brussels, 18–19 October 2018, in consultation with Han Lamers. Editorial assistance: Stephanie Heremans & Laura Tack, (Studies in Iconology, 20), Leuven - Paris - Bristol, CT: Peeters, 2021.
- From Kairos to Occasio Through Fortuna. Text/ Image/ Afterlife. On the Antique Critical Moment, a Grisaille in Mantua (School of Mantegna, 1495-1510) and the Fortunes of Aby Warburg (1866-1929), Brepols & Harvey Miller, 2021.
- The Gaze from Above. Reflections on Cosmic Eyes in Visual Culture. (Art & Religion, 11). Leuven: Peeters Publishers, 2021.
- Petrifying Gazes. Danaë and the Uncanny Space. (Studies in Iconology, 19). Leuven: Peeters Publishers, 2021.
- Baert, B., Hertog, T. & Van der Stock, J. Big Bang. Imagining the Universe. Veurne: Hannibal, 2021.
- "The Critical Moment. Revisiting the Annunciation in the Quattrocento: Wind, Kairos, Snail." In: J. Clifton, B. Haeger, E. Wise (Eds.), Marian Images in Context: Doctrines, Devotions, and Cults. (Brill's Studies on Art, Art History and Intellectual History). Leiden: Brill, 2022.
- Looking Into The Rain. Magic - Moisture - Medium. Berlin: De Gruyter, 2022.
- Baert, B., Claes, M-C. & Dekoninck, R. (Eds.) Ornamenta Sacra. Late Medieval and Early Modern Liturgical Objects in a European Context. (Art & Religion, 13). Leuven: Peeters, 2022.
- Baert B. On Barbara Baert. Compendium Questionnaires, in Iconographica. Studies in the History of Images (Iconographica Twenty Years: The Study of Images and the Future of the Field), Supplementum, 21, 2022/23, p. 10-18.
- Baert B. Op een dag zonder datum. Brieven over kunst en literatuur, Snoeck, 2023.
- Baert B. Bark / Birch / Birkenau. ( A Conversation with Guiseppe Penone, Georges Didi-Huberman and Gerhard Richter), in Textile. Cloth and Culture, 22, 2, 2024, p. 1-9.
