= Visual ethics =

Interdisciplinary field of study

Visual ethics is an emerging interdisciplinary field of scholarship that brings together religious studies, philosophy, photo and video journalism, visual arts, and cognitive science in order to explore the ways human beings relate to others ethically through visual perception. Historically, the field of ethics has relied heavily on rational-linguistic approaches, largely ignoring the importance of seeing and visual representation to human moral behavior. At the same time, studies in visual culture tend to analyze imagistic representations while ignoring many of the ethical dimensions involved. Visual ethics is a field of cross-fertilization of ethics and visual culture studies that seeks to understand how the production and reception of visual images is always ethical, whether or not we are consciously aware of this fact.

== Ethics of visual production ==
On the one hand, visual ethics is concerned with ethical issues involved in the production of visual images. For example, how do representations in newsmedia deploy cultural codes of race, class, ethnicity, gender, and so on in order to create distance from or empathy with specific people and groups? How can visual representations of the other facilitate or foreclose certain ethical responses from viewers? When is it ethically justifiable to capture and share images of another person in a moment of vulnerability? With whom should such images be shared?

== Ethics of visual reception ==
Visual ethics is equally concerned with the ethics of reception, that is, with seeing as an ethical act. How do different images influence our ethical responses and moral behavior in different ways? To what extent do our ethical responses to images take place pre-reflectively, by visual-perceptual processes in the body-mind, before images even come to consciousness? It can be looked upon more into the cultural perception. It always depends on the cultural background.

== Ethics and visual arts ==
This topic focuses on ethical theories and methods of ethical reasoning. Controversies and arguments abound as ethical decisions, or the lack thereof, continue to play a role in institutional practice. With the increasing gap between commerce and culture, the prioritization of good business over public service creates an increasingly blurry set of ethical guidelines. Collector-based exhibitions, conflicts of interest, and the de-accessioning practices of collections. One might ask do museums have a responsibility to their public? And if so, is this a part of institutional culture and is it being taught in today's museum studies programs? Elaine A. King and co-editor Gail Levin addressed many of these issues in the anthology they compiled titled "Ethics and The Visual Arts" published in September 2006 by Allworth Press in New York. This volume of 19 essays explores a diverse range of topics about ethics in the visual arts. The dark side of the arts is explored in this volume with nineteen diverse essays by such distinguished authors as Eric Fischl, Suzaan Boettger, Stephen Weil, Richard Serra, and more cover a broad range of topics facing today's artists, policy makers, art lawyers, galleries, museum professionals, and more.

== Visual Ethics Symposium ==
In April 2007, under the direction of Timothy Beal of the Baker-Nord Center for the Humanities and William E. Deal of the Inamori Center for Ethics at Case Western Reserve University hosted an interdisciplinary group of scholars in the fields of philosophical ethics, religious studies, theology, visual culture studies, neuroscience, and cognitive science to develop the first research collaboration on visual ethics.
