= Marita Sturken =

American academic (born 1957)

Marita Sturken (born 1957) is an American scholar, professor, and critic.

== Life and work ==
Marita Sturken is a professor and former chair in the Department of Media, Culture, and Communication at New York University's Steinhardt School of Culture, Education, and Human Development, where she teaches courses on visual culture, cultural memory, and consumerism. She focuses primarily on the politics of American culture. Before coming to NYU she was an associate professor at the Annenberg School for Communication at the University of Southern California.

She has published essays in Representations, Public Culture, Afterimage, Journal of Visual Culture, Memory Studies, International Journal of Communication, American Ethnologist, History and Theory, and positions, and was the editor of American Quarterly from 2003–2006.

She has a Ph.D. from the History of Consciousness program at the University of California, Santa Cruz.

She is author of Tourists of History: Memory, Kitsch, and Consumerism from Oklahoma City to Ground Zero (2007) and Tangled Memories: The Vietnam War, the AIDS Epidemic, and the Politics of Remembering (1997), and co-author of Practices of Looking: An Introduction to Visual Culture (2001). While working as a critic in the 1980s she wrote a series of articles for Afterimage magazine documenting the early history of video art and community video.

== Works ==
- Tangled Memories: The Vietnam War, the AIDS Epidemic, and the Politics of Remembering (University of California Press, 1997)
- Thelma & Louise (British Film Institute, 2000)
- Practices of Looking: An Introduction to Visual Culture (with Lisa Cartwright) (New York: Oxford University Press, 2001; second edition, 2009)
- Technological Visions: The Hopes and Fears that Shape New Technology (co-editor with Douglas Thomas and Sandra Ball-Rokeach) (Philadelphia: Temple University Press, 2004)
- Tourists of History: Memory, Kitsch, and Consumerism from Oklahoma City to Ground Zero (Duke University Press, 2007)
