= Didier Pollefeyt =

Belgian theologian (born 1965)

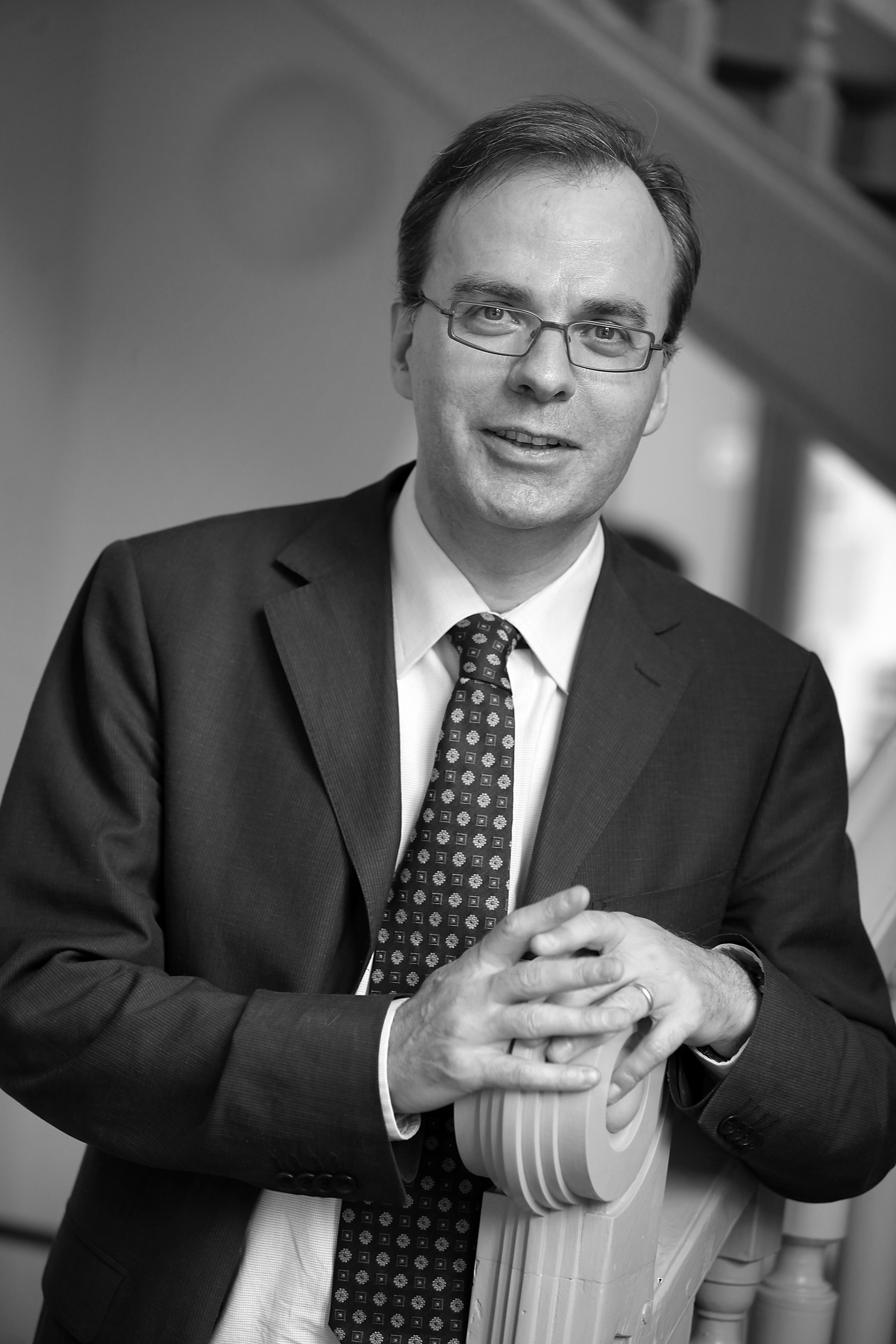
Didier Pollefeyt

Didier Pollefeyt (Menen, November 18, 1965) is a Belgian Roman Catholic theologian, full professor at the Faculty of Theology and Religious Studies and vice rector for education policy at the Katholieke Universiteit Leuven.

== Research career ==
After gaining the degree of license in the Religious Studies (1988) and Theology (1991) Pollefeyt obtained his doctoral degree in Theology (promotor: prof. Roger Burggraeve) with a dissertation on ethics after Auschwitz (1995). Thereafter he became instructor (2000), associate instructor (2002), associate professor (2005) and full professor (2008) at the Faculty of Theology, Katholieke Universiteit Leuven. Since 1986 his research focuses on the holocaust as a challenge for ethics, interreligious dialogue and education.

The research activities of Didier Pollefeyt are situated around 5 areas.

1. The ethical and theological analysis of the Holocaust and the development of the foundations of ethics and theology after Auschwitz.
2. An analysis of the questions of evil, guilt, remembrance, forgiveness and reconciliation.
3. The Jewish-Christian encounter.
4. The pedagogy of hermeneutical-communicative and interreligious education.
5. The religious identity of institutions, especially of catholic schools.

Besides, Pollefeyt coordinates the Center for Teacher Education of the Faculty of Theology and Religious Studies at the Katholieke Universiteit Leuven.

Since 2001 he is at the head of Thomas, a website for religious education.

Pollefeyt is vice rector for education policy at the Katholieke Universiteit Leuven and chairman of the Center for Peace Ethics.

== Works ==
- Interreligious Dialogue Beyond Absolutism, Relativism and Particularism. A Catholic Approach to Religious Diversity, in J. ROTH & L. GROB (ed.), Encountering the Stranger. A Jewish, Christian, Muslim Trialogue, Washington, University of Washington Press, 2011, in print.
- The Triune One, the Incarnate Logos, and Israels Covenental Life (with P A. CUNNINGHAM), in P.A. CUNNINGHAM, J. SIEVERS, M.C. BOYS, H.H. HENRIX & J. SVARTVIK, met voorwoord van W. Cardinal KASPER, Christ Jesus and the Jewish People Today. New Explorations of Theological Interrelationships, Grand Rapids, Eerdmans, 2011, p. 183-201.
- The Difference of Alterity. A Religious Pedagogy for an Interreligious and Interideological World, in J. DE TAVERNIER et al. (ed.), Responsibility, God and Society. Festschrift Roger Burggraeve (BETL, 217), Leuven, Peeters, 2008, p. 305-330.
- The Church and the Jews: Unsolvable Paradox or Unfinished Story?, in N. LAMDAN & A. MELLONI (ed.), Nostra Aetate: Origins, Promulgation, Impact on Jewish-Christian Relations (Christianity and History. Series of the John XXIII Foundation for Religious Studies in Bologna, 5), Berlin, LIT verlag, 2007, p. 131-144.
- Het leven doorgeven. Religieuze traditie in de katholieke godsdienstpedagogiek. Ontwikkelingen en toekomstperspectieven, in H. VAN CROMBRUGGE & W. MEIJER (ed.), Pedagogiek en traditie. Opvoeding en religie, Tielt, LannooCampus, 2004, p. 133-149.
- Developing Criteria for Religious and Ethical Teaching of the Holocaust, in M. GOLDENBERG & R.L. MILLEN (ed.), Testimony, Tensions, and Tikkun. Teaching the Holocaust in Colleges and Universities (The Pastora Goldner Series in Post-Holocaust Studies), Washington & London, University of Washington Press, 2007, p. 172-188.
- The Judgement of the Nazis, in M. BERENBAUM (ed.), Murder Most Mericiful. Essays on the Ethical Conundrum Occasioned by Sigi Ziering’s ‘The Judgement of Herbert Bierhoff ’(Studies in the Shoah, XXVIII), Lanham Boulder, University Press of America, 2005, p. 153-163.
- Horror Vacui. God and Evil in/after Auschwitz, in J. ROTH (ed.), Fire in the Ashes: God, Evil and the Holocaust, Washington, Washington University Press, 2005, chapter 9, p. 219-230.
- Ethics, Forgiveness and the Unforgivable after Auschwitz, in D. POLLEFEYT (ed.), Incredible Forgiveness. Christian Ethics between Fanaticism and Reconciliation, Leuven, Peeters, 2004, p. 121-159.
- Open to Both Ways...? Johannine Perspectives on Judaism in the Light of Jewish-Christian Dialogue (with R. BIERINGER), in M. LABAHN & K. SCHOLTISSEK & A. STROTMANN (ed.), Israel und seine Heilstraditionen im vierten Evangelium. Festschrift für Johannes Beutler SJ zum 70. Geburtstag, Paderborn, Ferdinand Schöningh, 2004, p. 11-32.
- Framing the Identity of Schools. Empirical Methodology for Research on the Catholic Identity of an Education Institute (with J. BOUWENS), in International Studies in Catholic Education, 2010.
- Forgiveness after the Holocaust, in D. PATTERSON & J. ROTH (ed.) After-Words. Post-Holocaust Struggles with Forgiveness, Reconciliation, Justice, Seattle, University of Washington Press, 2004, p. 55-72.
- The Morality of Auschwitz? A Critical Confrontation with Peter J. Haas, in J. BEMPORAD & J.T. PAWLIKOWSKI & J. SIEVERS (ed.), Good and Evil after Auschwitz. Ethical Implications for Today, New York, KTAV Publishing House, 2001, p. 119-138.
- Anti-Judaism and the Fourth Gospel. Papers of the Leuven Colloquium, 2000 (Jewish and Christian Heritage Series, 1)(with R. BIERINGER & D. POLLEFEYT & F. VANDECASTEELE-VANNEUVILLE), Assen, Royal Van Gorcum, 2001, 612 blz.
- Christology after the Holocaust. A Catholic Perspective, in M. MEYER & C. HUGHES (ed.), Jesus Then and Now. Images of Jesus in History and Christology, Harrisburg, PA, Trinity Press International, 2001, p. 229-247.
- Das jüdische Denken Emil L. Fackenheims oder die Begegnung von Athen und Jerusalem in Auschwitz, in J. VALENTIN & S. WENDEL (hrsg.), Jüdische Traditionen in der Philosophie des 20. Jahrhunderts, Darmstadt, Wissenschaftliche Buchgesellschaft, 2000, p. 196-213.
- Racism and Christian Belief. A Theological Reflection, in JET. Journal of Empirical Theology 12(1)(1999)28-36.
- Voorbij homogeneïsme en relativisme: een pleidooi voor een cultuur van de dialogale ontmoeting, in Ethische perspectieven 5(4)(1995)181-188.
- The Kafkaesque World of the Holocaust. Paradigmatic Shifts in the Interpretation of the Holocaust, in J.K. ROTH (ed.), Ethics after the Holocaust. Perspectives, Critiques and Responses (Paragon Books on the Holocaust), St. Paul, Paragon House, 1999, p. 210-242.
- Victims of Evil or Evil of Victims?, in H.J. CARGAS (ed.), Problems Unique to the Holocaust, Lexington, The University Press of Kentucky, 1999, p. 67-82.
- Leaving Evil in Germany: the Questionable Success of Goldhagen in the Low Countries (with G.J. COLLIJN), in F.H. LITTELL (ed.), Hyping the Holocaust. Scholars Answer Goldhagen (Philadelphia Series on the Holocaust, Genocide and Human Rights), New York, Cummings & Hathaway, 1997, p. 1-18.
