= Karlijn Demasure =

Belgian theology professor

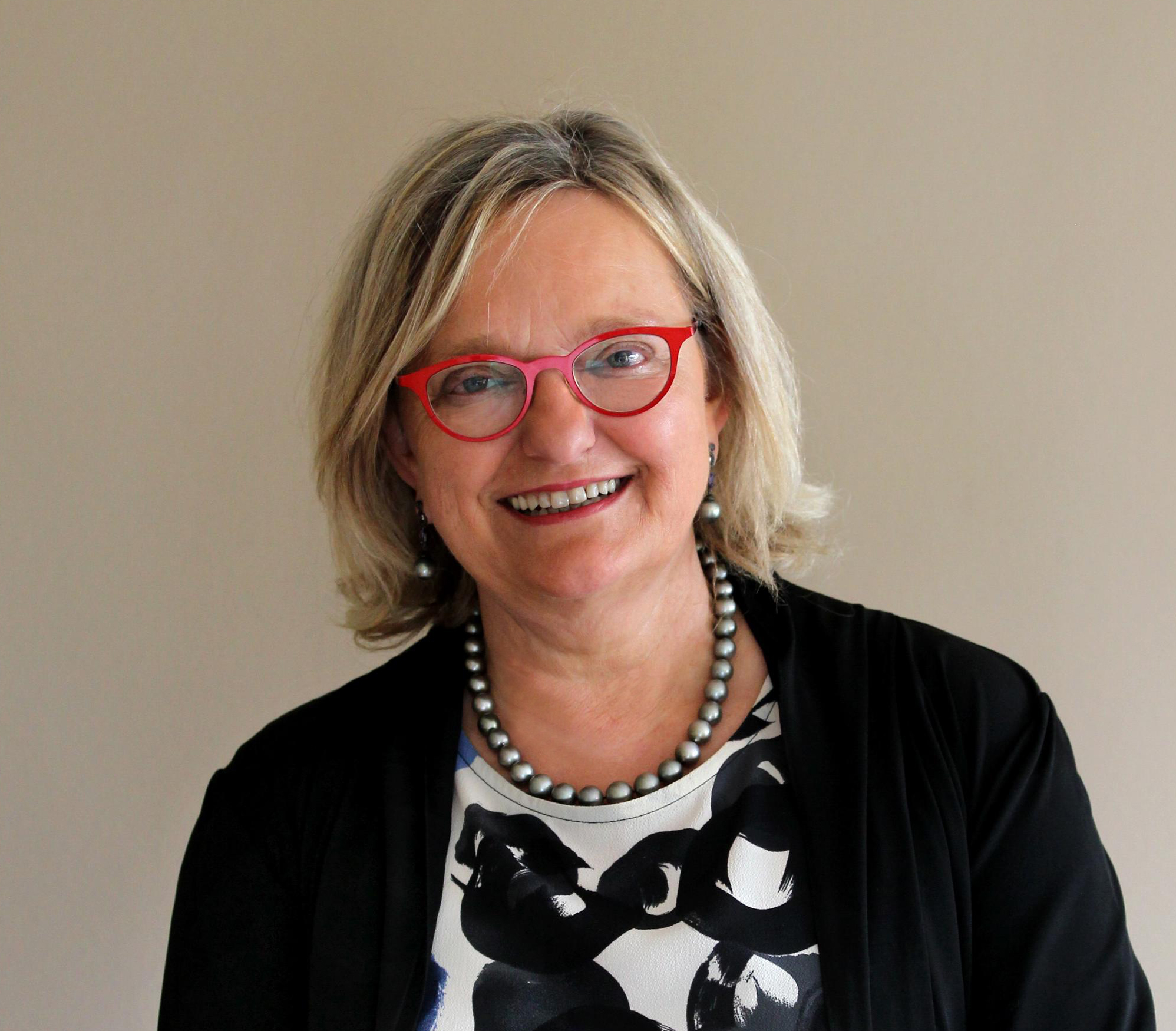
Karlijn Demasure, 2016

Karlijn "Karline" Demasure (born 1955) is a Belgian professor of theology teaching at the Saint Paul University in Ottawa (Canada). Her field of expertise is child sexual abuse in the Catholic Church. In 2019 she founded the Centre for Safeguarding Minors and Vulnerable Persons (Ottawa)

== Career ==
After obtaining in 2003 a PhD on child sexual abuse in the Catholic Church, Demasure worked as a doctoral assistant and assistant professor at the University of Leuven. From 2007 till 2011 she was a researcher for the Interdiocesan Services for Pastoral Care for Families (Belgium) and for the Chaplaincy in the Dutch Military (The Netherlands). From 2008 to 2014 she held the Chair Sisters of Our Lady of the Cross in Christian Family Studies as an associate professor at Saint Paul University Ottawa (Canada). From 2010 to 2014 she was the dean of the faculties of Human Sciences and Philosophy. From 2012 to 2014 Demasure was the president of the Societé Internationale de Théologie Pratique.

From 2014 to 2018 she was the Executive Director of the Centre for Child Protection of the Gregorian University in Rome. In 2018 Demasure was awarded the rank of Officer of the Order of the Crown (Kingdom of Belgium).

In 2019 she decided to return to Saint Paul University in Ottawa, Canada, where she founded the interdisciplinary Centre for Safeguarding Minors and Vulnerable Persons. This Centre, having an interdisciplinary approach, has as its main purpose to help eliminate the threat and the trauma of abuse in society and Church. The Centre developes formation programs in English and French. In 2023 Demasure started an international research project on “Towards a Trustworthy Church”.
