= Han Lamers =

Dutch classical philologist

Han Lamers (born 1984 in Eindhoven, Netherlands) is a Dutch classical philologist. He is a full professor of classical philology at the University of Oslo.

== Life ==
Lamers studied classical philology at Leiden University and art history at KU Leuven, earning his PhD in 2013 from Leiden University. Since 2019, he has held the position of full professor of classical philology at the University of Oslo.

His research interests include the classical traditions of Greece and Rome in the early modern period and modern Europe, focusing on cultural property, self-representation, and intellectual history. For example, the Codex Fori Mussolini at Foro Italico.

== Selected works ==
- Greece Reinvented: Transformations of Byzantine Hellenism in Renaissance Italy. Leiden, 2015. ISBN 978-90-04-29755-5.
- With Bettina Reitz-Joosse (ed.), The Codex Fori Mussolini: A Latin Text of Italian Fascism. London, 2016. ISBN 978-1-4742-2695-0.
- (Editor) Constructing Hellenism: Studies on the History of Greek Learning in Early Modern Europe, special issue International Journal of the Classical Tradition 25, 3, 2018. ISSN 1073-0508.
- Afterlife of Antiquity: Anton Springer (1825–1891) on the Classical Tradition. Leuven, 2019. ISBN 978-90-429-3878-6.
- With Natasha Constantinidou (ed.), Receptions of Hellenism in Early Modern Europe: 15th–17th Centuries. Leiden, 2020. ISBN 90-04-34385-7.
- With Bettina Reitz-Joosse and Valerio Sanzotta (eds.), Studies in the Latin Literature and Epigraphy of Italian Fascism. Leuven, 2020. ISBN 9789461663122.
- The Right Moment: Essays Offered to Barbara Baert, Laureate of the 2016 Francqui Prize in Human Sciences, on the Occasion of the Celebratory Symposium at the Francqui Foundation, Brussels, 18-19 October 2018. Leuven, 2021. ISBN 9789042946729.
