= Henry Sussman =

American literary scholar

Henry Sussman (born 1947 in Philadelphia, Pennsylvania) is an American literary scholar who was a visiting professor of German at Yale University. His research interests focus on European-American 19th and 20th-century comparative literary studies, contemporary system theories, and critical theory. He is the author of several books, including The Aesthetic Contract: Statutes of Art and Intellectual Work in Modernity (1997).

== Life and career ==
Before completing a master's degree at Johns Hopkins University, Sussman studied English and American literature at Brandeis University. Sussman earned his PhD at Johns Hopkins University in comparative literature in 1975. Sussman was a professor of Comparative Literature at the University of Buffalo (SUNY Buffalo), where he served as the department chair and Associate Dean of Arts & Letters. From 2002 until his retirement in 2017, he served as a visiting professor at Yale University.

In 2015, Susmann was the Charlotte M. Craig Distinguished Visiting professor of German at Rutgers University. He has held fellowships at the Center for Excellence Morphomata (University of Cologne) (2010–2011), the NEH Humanities (2001–2002), and the Rockefeller Foundation (1985–1986). He was a Senior Fulbright Lecturer at the Hebrew University for his work the Aesthetic Contract (1994). Since 1988, he has been part of the Johns Hopkins University Society of Scholars.

== Selected works ==
- Playful Intelligence: Digitizing Tradition (London & New York: Bloomsbury, 2014).
- Around the Book: Systems and Literacy (New York: Fordham University Press, 2011).
- Idylls of the Wanderer: Outside in Literature and Theory (New York: Fordham University Press, 2007). [Essays on the Zohar, Nietzsche, Joyce, Benjamin, Kafka, Schulz, Faulkner, Baldwin].
- The Task of the Critic: Poetics, Philosophy, and Religion (New York: Fordham University Press, 2005).
- The Aesthetic Contract: Statutes of Art and Intellectual Work in Modernity (Stanford: Stanford University Press, 1997).
- Psyche and Text: The Sublime and the Grandiose in Literature, Psychopathology, and Culture (Albany: SUNY Press, 1993).
- Kafka's Unholy Trinity: The Trial, Twayne's Masterworks Series (New York: Macmillan, 1993). Afterimages of
- Modernity: Structure and Indifference in Twentieth-Century Literature (Baltimore: Johns Hopkins University Press, 1990).
- High Resolution: Critical Theory and the Problem of Literacy (New York: Oxford University Press, 1989).
- The Hegelian Aftermath: Essays on Hegel, Kierkegaard, Freud, Proust, and James (Baltimore: Johns Hopkins University Press, 1982).
- Franz Kafka: Geometrician of Metaphor (Madison: Coda Press, Inc., 1979).
