= David Morgan (art historian) =

American art historian

David Morgan is Professor of Religious Studies at Duke University, in Durham, North Carolina, with an additional appointment in Duke's Department of Art, Art History and Visual Studies. Morgan served as the Chair in the Department of Religious Studies in Trinity College of Duke University from 2013 to 2016. He is the author of numerous books, including The Forge of Vision (2015), The Embodied Eye (2012), and The Sacred Gaze (2005).

== Biography ==
He holds a BA in Studio Art (concentration on sculpture) at Concordia College (1980), a MA in Art History at the University of Arizona (1984), and a PhD in Art History at the University of Chicago (1990), He taught at Valparaiso University from 1990 to 2007, where he was the Duesenberg Professor in Christianity and the Arts, in the honors college of Valparaiso University.

== Academic work ==
Morgan’s writing has focused on the history of Protestant visual culture since the eighteenth century. He has also studied Catholic devotional images, the history of art theory, and religion and media. He was co-founder and is co-editor of the journal, Material Religion, and co-edits two book series at Routledge (London): Religion, Media, Culture, and Research in Religion, Media, and Culture. He is an Elected Life Member of Clare Hall, Cambridge University and Elected member of the American Antiquarian Society.

Morgan is a recipient of the Annual Book Award from the Association of American Publishers in Professional and Scholarly Publishing for 1999 in the category of Religion and Philosophy for the book Protestants and Pictures: Religion, Visual Culture, and the Age of American Mass Production. His edited volume Icons of American Protestantism: The Art of Warner Sallman received the CHOICE Outstanding Academic Book for 1996 from the American Library Association.

His books include:

- Morgan, David (2018). Images at Work: The Material Culture of Enchantment, Oxford, England: Oxford University Press.
- Morgan, David (2015). The Forge of Vision: A Visual History of Modern Christianity, Berkeley, CA: University of California Press.
- Morgan, David (2012). The Embodied Eye: Religious Visual Culture and the Social Life of Feeling, Berkeley, CA: University of California Press. It had reviews in CHOICE (2012), IMAGE online, Religious Studies Review, American Anthropologist, Art and Christianity, Journal of Religion in Europe, Critical Research on Religion, and Journal of Religion and Popular Culture.
- Morgan, David (2008). The Sacred Heart of Jesus: The Visual Evolution of a Devotion, Amsterdam: Amsterdam University Press.
- Morgan, David (2007). The Lure of Images: A History of Religion and Visual Media in America, New York: Routledge. It had reviews in Choice Reviews, The Journal of American History, Church History, Nova Religio, and Journal of the Scientific Study of Religion.
- Morgan, David (2005). The Sacred Gaze: Religious Visual Culture in Theory and Practice, Berkeley: University of California Press. It had reviews in Choice Reviews, Scripture Bulletin, The Art Newspaper, Winterthur Portfolio, American Journal of Sociology, Church History, The Expository Times, Material Religion,Missiology: An International Review, and Journal of Religion.
- Morgan, David (1999). Protestants and Pictures: Religion, Visual Culture, and the Age of American Mass Production, New York: Oxford University Press. It had reviews in The Christian Century, The Cresset, Journal of American History, The Historian, Journal of Religion and Popular Culture Baker, Kelly J. (2003). Protestants and Pictures: Religion, Visual Culture, and the Age of American Mass Production, Journal of Religion and Popular Culture Vol. 5, No. 1, online; Religious Studies Review, The American Historical Review, Church History, Books & Culture, Journal of Religion, and CAA Reviews.
- Morgan, David (1998). Visual Piety: A History and Theory of Popular Religious Images, Berkeley, CA: University of California Press. It was reviewed in Publishers Weekly, Anglican Theological Review, Art Book Review, Choice Reviews, Christian Scholar’s Review, Journal for the Scientific Study of Religion, The Art Newspaper, Books & Culture, Communication Research Trends, Theology Digest, Washington Post, Catholic Historical Review, The Christian Century, Fides et Historia, Religion, Kunst, Winterthur Portfolio, The Journal of American History, Journal of the American Academy of Religion, Journal of Religion, Nova Religio, The HEYTHROP Journal, and Journal of American Studies.

His edited volumes include:

- Morgan, David (2010). ed. Religion and Material Culture: The Matter of Belief, London and New York: Routledge.
- Morgan, David (2008). ed. Key Words in Media, Religion, and Culture, London: Routledge.
- Elkins, James and David Morgan (2008). eds. Re-Enchantment, New York, NY: Routledge.
- Morgan, David and Sally M. Promey (2001). eds. The Visual Culture of American Religions, Berkeley, CA: University of California Press.
- Morgan, David (1996). ed. Icons of American Protestantism: The Art of Warner Sallman, New Haven, CT: Yale University Press.
