= Journal of Religion and Popular Culture =

- Discipline: Religious and cultural studies
- Language: English
- Edited by: Jennifer E. Porter, David Feltmate

Publication details
- History: 2002-present
- Publisher: University of California Press (since 2025)
- Frequency: Triannually

Standard abbreviations
- ISO 4: J. Relig. Pop. Cult.

Indexing
- ISSN: 1703-289X
- LCCN: 2004700264
- OCLC no.: 51673378

Links
- Journal homepage; Online archive at Project MUSE

The Journal of Religion and Popular Culture is a triannual online peer-reviewed academic journal that was established in 2002 and is currently published by University of California Press. The editors-in-chief are Jennifer E. Porter, Associate professor at Memorial University of Newfoundland and David Feltmate, professor at Auburn University at Montgomery. The journal covers the interactions between religion and popular culture.

== Abstracting and indexing ==
The journal is abstracted and indexed in:

- ATLA Religion Database
- EBSCO databases
- MLA International Bibliography
- ProQuest databases
- Scopus
