= Journal of Visual Culture =

Visual Culture
- Discipline: Visual arts
- Language: English
- Edited by: Marquard Smith

Publication details
- History: 2002-present
- Publisher: SAGE Publications
- Frequency: Triannually

Standard abbreviations
- ISO 4: J. Vis. Cult.

Indexing
- ISSN: 1470-4129 (print); 1741-2994 (web)
- LCCN: 2002222794
- OCLC no.: 50320694

Links
- Journal homepage; Online access; Online archive

The Journal of Visual Culture is a triannual peer-reviewed academic journal that covers the field of visual arts. The editor-in-chief is Marquard Smith (Royal College of Art). It was established in 2002 and is published by SAGE Publications.

== Abstracting and indexing ==
The journal is abstracted and indexed in:

- Academic Search Premier
- British Humanities Index
- Social Sciences Citation Index
- Scopus
- Arts and Humanities Citation Index
- Current Contents/Arts and Humanities
