= Faculty of Theology, Catholic University of Leuven =

Coordinates: 50.87671°N 4.70138°E

Faculty of Theology
- Faculté de théologie Faculteit Godgeleerdheid
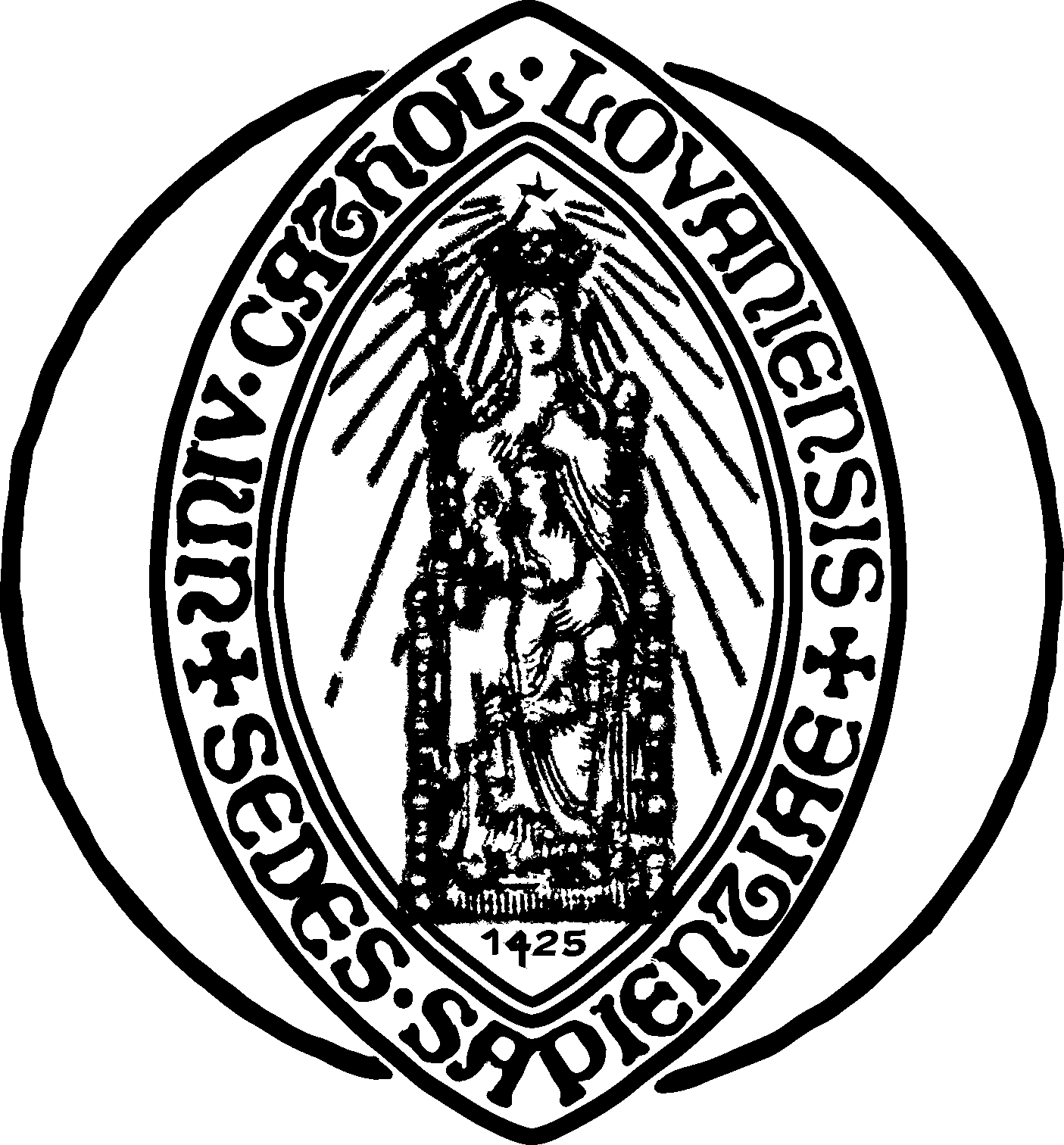
- Latin: Facultas Sacrae Theologiae Lovaniensis
- Motto: Sedes Sapientiae
- Motto in English: "Seat of Wisdom", or "Seat of Knowledge"
- Active: 1834–1968
- Parent institution: KU Leuven and UCLouvain
- Location: Leuven and Louvain-la-Neuve, Belgium

The Leuven Faculty of Theology was a branch of the Catholic University of Leuven, founded in 1834 in Mechelen by the bishops of Belgium as the Catholic University of Belgium, that moved its seat to the town of Leuven in 1835, changing its name to Catholic University of Leuven.

In 1968 the faculty was divided into Flemish and French speaking departments, and they exist today as faculties of two separate universities: the Faculty of Theology and Religious Studies of the Katholieke Universiteit Leuven (KU Leuven), and the Faculty of Theology of the University of Louvain (UCLouvain), which moved to Louvain-la-Neuve.

== History of the Faculty (1834—1969) ==
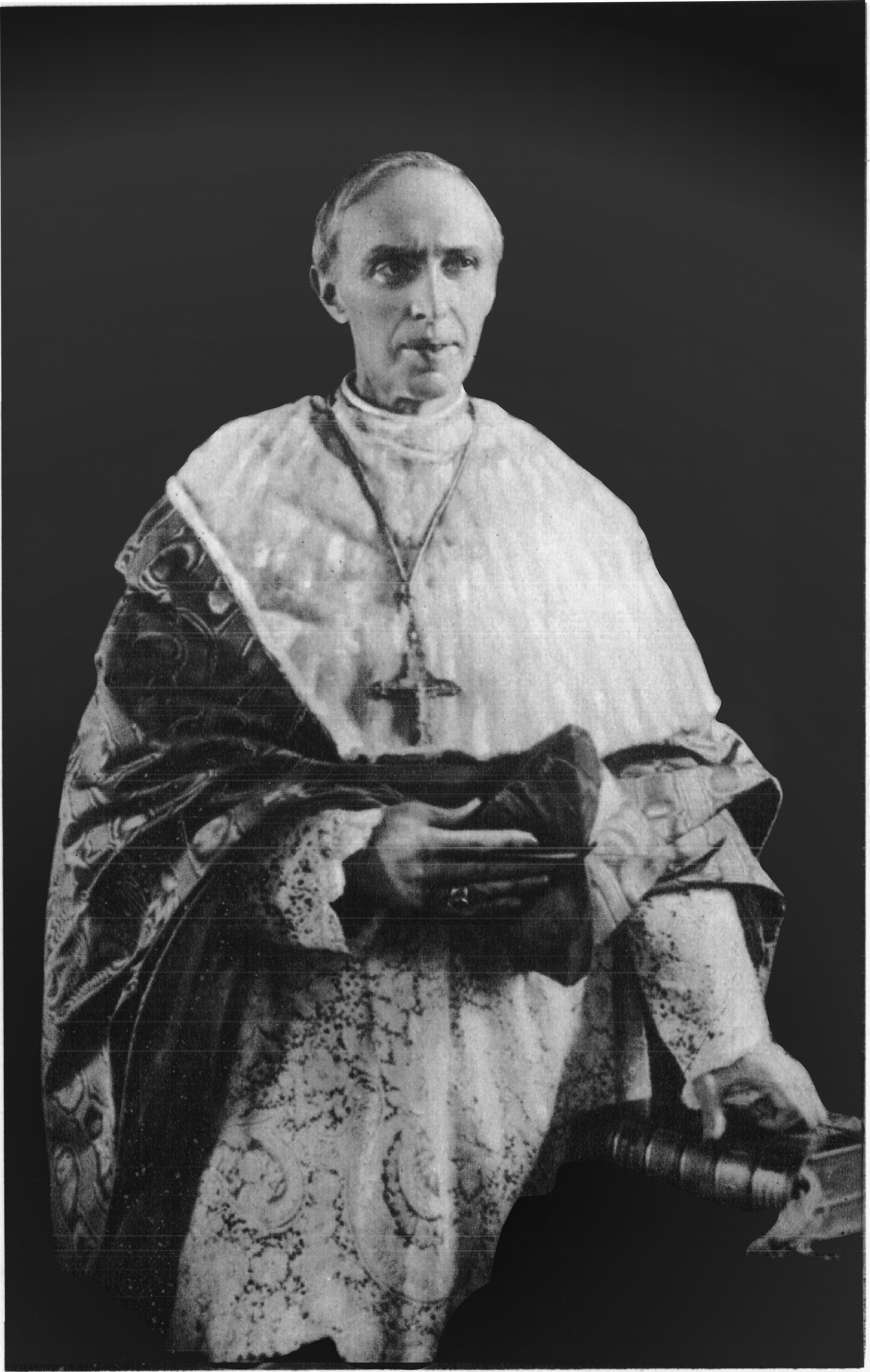
Cardinal Mercier

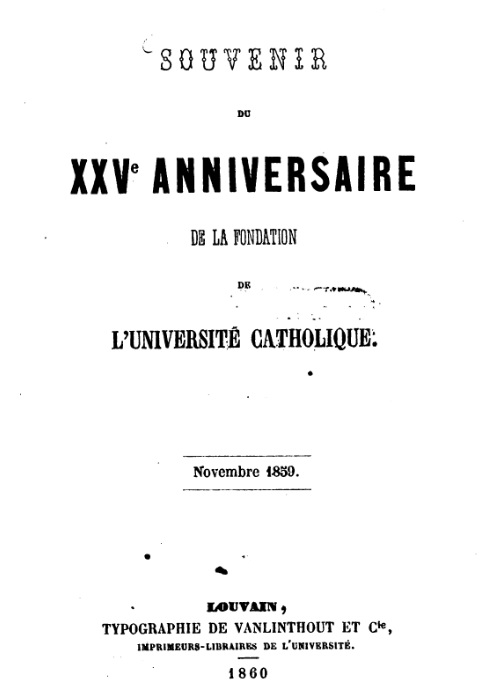
Book celebrating the 25 anniversary of the founding of the Catholic University of Louvain, November 3, 1859.

The Faculty of Theology of the Catholic University of Mechlin then called Catholic University of Leuven received primarily those students having already completed two years of philosophy and four years of theology as a part of their priestly education. A number of introductory courses were taught in the years 1853–1877. These courses were reorganized in 1898 as a Schola Minor in association with the American College in Leuven. From the very beginning Canon Law was taught by the Theological Faculty until both programs separated in accordance with the Apostolic Constitution Deus scientiarum Dominus in 1929.

The Faculty included among its first generation of professors prominent figures such as Jan Theodoor Beelen (Holy Scripture Chair) and Jean-Baptiste Malou (Dogmatic Theology Chair). There was a revived preference for a positive and historically oriented theology in the form of historical-critical research at the end of the nineteenth century. In 1890 the rector Jean Baptiste Abbeloos appointed the German Bernard Jungmann to the newly organized Cours pratique d'histoire ecclésiastique. Rapid progress was made in Biblical studies through a theological faculty, uniquely situated as embedded within a "complete university," that played a role that should not be underestimated—particularly in the exchange of ideas, the application of the historical method, and specialization in the study of ancient Eastern languages. Students followed lectures in Christian Archeology taught by Edmond Reusens and a new course: Histoire critique de l'Ancien Testament, taught by Albin van Hoonacker in 1889. Six years later Alfred Cauchie, who founded the Revue d'histoire ecclésiastique, also became a professor in the theological faculty.

Along with the two previously mentioned professors, Professor Paulin Ladeuze joined the faculty as a specialist in the critical study of the New Testament. In addition, the faculty participated in the resurgence of Thomism, which was propagated in Leuven by Désiré-Joseph Mercier at the Institut Supérieur de Philosophie, with the formation of a Chair of Philosophy of St. Thomas Aquinas in 1882.

All of this enabled the Leuven Faculty of Theology to enter the twentieth century as a center of study built around the historical-critical approach to theology. During the Modernist Crisis, Leuven theologians were spared from further censures thanks to the protection of Cardinal Désiré-Joseph Mercier. The direction of critical research set by the faculty continued under a generation of professors who expanded the faculty's international reputation, specifically through contributions to the Second Vatican Council.

Among the theologians laboring during the council's time were renowned exegetes such as Lucien Cerfaux, Joseph Coppens, and Albert Descamps, dogmatic theologians such as Charles Moeller and Gerard Philips and Gustave Thils; patristic theologians such as Joseph Lebon and René Draguet; church historians like Roger Aubert; and moral theologians such as Louis Janssens They all contributed to the renewing of theology in the twentieth century, including those that formed themselves in various movements (ecumenical movement, liturgical movement, renewal of Bible studies, and patristics). However, this had consequences for theologians like René Draguet, who agreed with the Nouvelle Théologie and, as a result, were condemned in 1942, along with theologians like Marie-Dominique Chenu. In the same year the Hoger Instituut voor Godsdienstwetenschappen (Higher Institute for Religious Studies) was established, where a theologian such as Edward Schillebeeckx briefly taught dogmatics. This institute was established with the goal of providing university level theological education to the laity. In 1958 the program developed into a complete four-year curriculum.

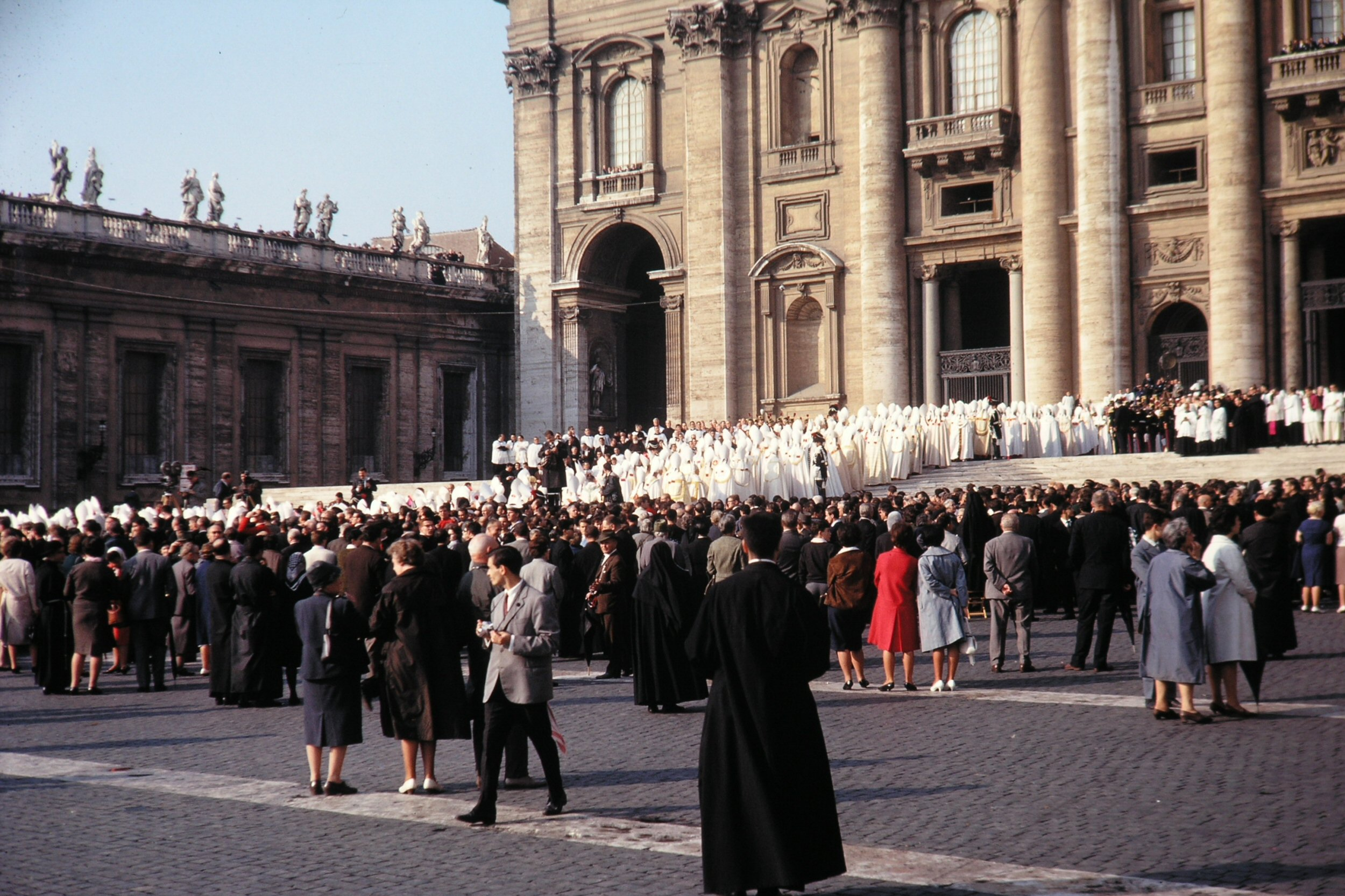
Second Session of Vatican II

Leuven theologians also worked closely together with the Belgian episcopate, led by Cardinal Leo Joseph Suenens, in Rome during the preparations for and the actual sessions of the Second Vatican Council (1962–1965). Many of these theologians exerted a decisive influence upon a number of council documents (including Sacrosanctum Concilium, Gaudium et spes, Dei verbum, Nostra aetate, and particularly Lumen gentium, among others). This was made possible through their expertise, their willingness to collaborate with others (e.g. theologians such as Yves Congar were offered lodging at the Pontifical Belgian College in Rome) and by holding several key positions (e.g. Msgr. Gerard Philips' role as adjunct-secretary of the Doctrinal Commission made him into the key architect of Vatican II's Dogmatic Constitution on the Church). A painful period for the theological faculty, as it was for the entire university, was the end of the 1960s. Discord flared up among professors and students regarding the question of which language should be used for educating students. This came to expression, among other ways, in the so-called Leuven Flemish-movement, and the linguistic conflict led to the splitting of the University into a Dutch-language and a French-language part in 1969; As a result, the Theological Faculty was also split in two: the Dutch-language faculty remained in the Flemish town of Leuven and the French-language group went to be a part of the newly established Université Catholique de Louvain in Louvain-la-Neuve.

== The faculty in Leuven (1970–2022) ==
Division of the Leuven University had further consequences for the theological faculty. Preeminently, the professor corps was divided, and henceforth it became a Dutch-language education and research body, along with an international English-language program. In 1974 a new library was opened (called the Maurits Sabbe Library since 2004), which is one of the most extensive theological libraries in the world. This library houses various archive collections as well, including the Centre for the Study of the Second Vatican Council.

During the postconciliar period, the number of lay theologians increased strongly among professors and students. In 1970 the Higher Institute of Religious Studies was integrated to a greater extent into the faculty's full-time program. Following the decree for universities in 1991, this institute was completely integrated into the faculty's academic training.

The current faculty is a Roman Catholic Faculty of Theology, and as such stands in the tradition of the Old Faculty established in 1432. Both state diplomas or degrees in theology and canonical degrees are granted by the faculty, which organizes its programs according to the Apostolic Constitution Sapientia Christiana of 1979. Nevertheless, students from various backgrounds and confessional denominations are enrolled in faculty programs. This helps to account for the faculty's international appeal among theological students who come from around the world to study in Leuven, or who attend an ever-growing number of affiliated institutes, such as the Institut Catholique de Paris. Because it offers a completely English-language program, research and education on the faculty has shifted from the French-speaking to the English-speaking world. Through the internationalization of the program, the Leuven faculty belongs to the group of theological faculties with the highest number of students around the world. In the 2022-23 academic year, almost 300 students were enrolled in the Dutch-language program, and the number of international students increased to 338. Approximately 160 students are preparing a doctoral dissertation under the guidance of the Leuven professoral corps. Also, the faculty offers support for alumni engaged in teaching on the level of secondary education and in the pastoral field, through supportive websites such as Thomas and Elisabeth

The faculty is composed of five research units, and its work is carried out in conformity with the Bachelor-Master structure established in accordance with the Bologna declaration:

- Research Unit of Biblical Studies
- Research Unit of Systematic Theology and the Study of Religions
- Research Unit of Theological and Comparative Ethics
- Research Unit of History of Church and Theology
- Research Unit of Pastoral and Empirical Theology

== Theologian-Rectors ==
A number of professors from the Faculty of Theology have served as rector of the university. Since the rector's office was very frequently changed during the time of the Old University, only those theologian-rectors who served after the reopening of the faculty in 1834 are listed below:

- Paulin Ladeuze
- Albert Descamps
- Marc Vervenne

== See also ==
- Faculty of Theology of the Old University of Leuven (1432–1797)

== Bibliography ==
=== The Faculty from its foundation in 1834 to 1969 ===
- R. Aubert, La faculté de théologie de Louvain du XVme siècle à Vatican II (Leuven, 1985; BETL 47) 17–37.
- R. Aubert, Le grand tournant de la Faculté de théologie de l'Université de Louvain, Mélanges M.D. Chenu (Paris, 1967) 73–109.
- L. Kenis, The Louvain Faculty of Theology in the Nineteenth Century. A Bibliography of the Professors in Theology and Canon Law, with Biographical Notes (Leuven, 1994; ANL 34) 231 p.
- F. Neirynck, De theologische faculteit 1919–1969 (Leuven, 1970; ANL 17).
- J. Coppens, Les six dernières années des Facultés unitaires de Théologie et de Droit Canonique 1962-1968. Nécrologies et Chronique 1962-1970 (Leuven, 1980; ANL 24) 418 p.
- R. Mathes, Löwen und Rom. Zur Gründung der Katholischen Universität Löwen unter besonderer Berücksichtigung der Kirchen- und Bildungspolitik Papst Gregors XVI (Essen, 1975; Beiträge zur neueren Geschichte der katholischen Theologie 18) vi-289 p.

=== Current Faculty ===
- J. Tollebeek, Liesbeth Nys et al., De stad op de berg. Een geschiedenis van de Leuvense universiteit sinds 1968 (Leuven, 2005), 381 p.
- M. Lamberigts, L. Gevers, B. Pattyn, Hoger Instituut voor Godsdienstwetenschappen. Faculteit der Godgeleerdheid K.U. Leuven 1942–1992 (Leuven, 1992; Documenta Libraria 13) xii–305 p.
- D. Donnelly, J. Famerée, M. Lamberigts, K. Schelkens, The Belgian Contribution to the Second Vatican Council (Leuven, 2008; BETL 216).
- L. Gevers, L. Kenis, De Faculteit Godgeleerdheid in de K.U. Leuven 1969–1995 (Leuven, 1997; ANL 39).
- D. Claes, Theologie in tijden van verandering. De Theologische Faculteit te Leuven in de twintigste eeuw 1900–1968 [unpublished doctoral dissertation, Faculty of Theology, Katholieke Universiteit Leuven] (Leuven, 2004) xxxvii–335 p.
- W. Depril, De Leuvense theoloog en oriëntalist René Draguet (1896–1980). Een historisch-theologisch onderzoek naar zijn theologische positie en zijn veroordeling door de kerkelijke overheid (1942) [unpublished doctoral dissertation, Faculty of Theology, Katholieke Universiteit Leuven] (Leuven, 2010).

== Notes ==
1. This new "Catholic University of Mechlin" then renamed to "Catholic University of Leuven" does not have legally the right to pretend to be the continuation of the Old University of Leuven, according to this ruling and motivation of the Belgian Cour d'Appel of 1844: La Belgique Judiciaire, 28 July 1844 n° 69, p. 1 : Cour d’Appel de Bruxelles. Deuxième chambre. L'université libre de Louvain ne représente pas légalement l’antique université de cette ville. Attendu que cette université (l’ancienne Université de Louvain), instituée par une bulle papale, de concert avec l'autorité souveraine, formait un corps reconnu dans l'État, ayant différentes attributions, dont plusieurs même lui étaient déléguées par le pouvoir civil; Attendu que ce corps a été supprimé par les lois de la république française; Attendu que l'université existant actuellement à Louvain ne peut être considérée comme continuant celle qui existait en 1457, ces deux établissemens ayant un caractère bien distinct, puisque l'université actuelle, non reconnue comme personne civile, n'est qu'un établissement tout-à-fait privé, résultat de la liberté d'enseignement, en dehors de toute action du pouvoir et sans autorité dans l'État.
