= Neoromanticism (music) =

Classical music style

In Western classical music, neoromanticism is a return to the emotional expression associated with nineteenth-century Romanticism. Throughout the 20th and into the 21st century, numerous composers have created works which rejected or ignored emerging styles such as Modernism and Postmodernism.

== Definitions ==
Neoromanticism was a term that originated in literary theory in the early 19th century to distinguish later kinds of romanticism from earlier manifestations. In music, it was first used by Richard Wagner in his polemical 1851 article "Oper und Drama", as a disparaging term for the French romanticism of Hector Berlioz and Giacomo Meyerbeer from 1830 onwards, which he regarded as a degenerated form of true romanticism. The word came to be used by historians of ideas to refer to music from 1850 onwards, and to the work of Wagner in particular. The designation "neo" was used to acknowledge the fact that music of the second half of the 19th century remained in a romantic mode in an unromantic age, dominated by positivism, when literature and painting had moved on to realism and impressionism.

According to Daniel Albright,

In the late twentieth century, the term Neoromanticism came to suggest a music that imitated the high emotional saturation of the music of (for example) Schumann [ Romanticism ], but in the 1920s it meant a subdued and modest sort of emotionalism, in which the excessive gestures of the Expressionists were boiled down into some solid residue of stable feeling.

Thus, in Albright's view, neoromanticism in the 1920s was not a return to romanticism but, on the contrary, a tempering of an overheated post-romanticism.

In this sense, Virgil Thomson proclaimed himself to be "most easily-labeled practitioner [of Neo-Romanticism] in America,"

Neo-Romanticism involves rounded melodic material (the neo-Classicists affected angular themes) and the frank expression of personal sentiments. . . . That position is an esthetic one purely, because technically we are eclectic. Our contribution to contemporary esthetics has been to pose the problems of sincerity in a new way. We are not out to impress, and we dislike inflated emotions. The feelings we really have are the only ones we think worthy of expression. . . . Sentiment is our subject and sometimes landscape, but preferably a landscape with figures.)

== Notable composers ==
The United States has a sizable tradition of neoromantic composers, following practitioners from the mid-20th century such as Aaron Copland, Samuel Barber, Leonard Bernstein, Paul Creston, David Diamond, Nicolas Flagello, John Williams, Ned Rorem and John Corigliano. Younger generations include Richard Danielpour, Jennifer Higdon, Aaron Jay Kernis, Robert Maggio and Christopher Rouse.

Since the mid-1970s the term has come to be identified with neoconservative postmodernism, especially in Germany, Austria, and the United States, with composers such as Wolfgang Rihm and George Rochberg. Currently active US-based composers widely described as neoromantic include David Del Tredici and Ellen Taaffe Zwilich. Francis Poulenc and Henri Sauguet were French composers considered neoromantic, while Virgil Thomson, Nicolas Nabokov, Howard Hanson and Douglas Moore were American composers considered neoromantic.
