= Postmodern music =

Music of the postmodern era

Postmodern music is music in the art music tradition produced in the postmodern era. It also describes any music that follows aesthetical and philosophical trends of postmodernism. As an aesthetic movement it was formed partly in reaction to modernism but is not primarily defined as oppositional to modernist music. Postmodernists question the tight definitions and categories of academic disciplines, which they regard simply as the remnants of modernity.

== The postmodernist musical attitude ==
Postmodernism in music is not a distinct musical style, but rather refers to music of the postmodern era. Postmodernist music, on the other hand, shares characteristics with postmodernist art—that is, art that comes after and reacts against modernism (see Modernism in Music). Rebecca Day, Lecturer in Music Analysis, writes "within music criticism, postmodernism is seen to represent a conscious move away from the perceptibly damaging hegemony of binaries such as aestheticism/formalism, subject/object, unity/disunity, part/whole, that were seen to dominate former aesthetic discourse, and that when left unchallenged (as postmodernists claim of modernist discourse) are thought to de-humanise music analysis".

Fredric Jameson, a major figure in the thinking on postmodernism and culture, calls postmodernism "the cultural dominant of the logic of late capitalism", meaning that, through globalization, postmodern culture is tied inextricably with capitalism (Mark Fisher, writing 20 years later, goes further, essentially calling it the sole cultural possibility). Drawing from Jameson and other theorists, David Beard and Kenneth Gloag argue that, in music, postmodernism is not just an attitude but also an inevitability in the current cultural climate of fragmentation. As early as 1938, Theodor Adorno had already identified a trend toward the dissolution of "a culturally dominant set of values", citing the commodification of all genres as beginning of the end of genre or value distinctions in music.

In some respects, Postmodern music could be categorized as simply the music of the postmodern era, or music that follows aesthetic and philosophical trends of postmodernism, but with Jameson in mind, it is clear these definitions are inadequate. As the name suggests, the postmodernist movement formed partly in reaction to the ideals of modernism, but in fact postmodern music is more to do with functionality and the effect of globalization than it is with a specific reaction, movement, or attitude. In the face of capitalism, Jameson says, "It is safest to grasp the concept of the postmodern as an attempt to think the present historically in an age that has forgotten how to think historically in the first place".

== Characteristics ==
Jonathan Kramer posits the idea (following Umberto Eco and Jean-François Lyotard) that postmodernism (including musical postmodernism) is less a surface style or historical period (i.e., condition) than an attitude. Each philosopher interprets the term Postmodernism differently. Lawrence Kramer uses it very loosely and explains it as susceptible to mere trends. He loosely follows Jean Francois Lyotard's views of synthesizing schemes, unity coherence, generality, totality, and structure losing their authority. These strategies of understanding are incorrigibly interdisciplinary and plural and rather see it made as a system over an ethos. Kramer enumerates 16 (arguably subjective) "characteristics of postmodern music, by which I mean music that is understood in a postmodern manner, or that calls forth postmodern listening strategies, or that provides postmodern listening experiences, or that exhibits postmodern compositional practices." According to Kramer, postmodern music:

1. is not simply a repudiation of modernism or its continuation, but has aspects of both a break and an extension
2. is, on some level and in some way, ironic
3. does not respect boundaries between sonorities and procedures of the past and of the present
4. challenges barriers between 'high' and 'low' styles
5. shows disdain for the often unquestioned value of structural unity
6. questions the mutual exclusivity of elitist and populist values
7. avoids totalizing forms (e.g., does not want entire pieces to be tonal or serial or cast in a prescribed formal mold)
8. considers music not as autonomous but as relevant to cultural, social, and political contexts
9. includes quotations of or references to music of many traditions and cultures
10. considers technology not only as a way to preserve and transmit music but also as deeply implicated in the production and essence of music
11. embraces contradictions
12. distrusts binary oppositions
13. includes fragmentations and discontinuities
14. encompasses pluralism and eclecticism
15. presents multiple meanings and multiple temporalities
16. locates meaning and even structure in listeners, more than in scores, performances, or composers

Daniel Albright summarizes the main tendencies of musical postmodernism as:

1. Bricolage
2. Polystylism
3. Randomness

== Timescale ==
One author has suggested that the emergence of postmodern music in popular music occurred in the late 1960s, influenced in part by psychedelic rock and one or more of the later Beatles albums. Beard and Gloag support this position, citing Jameson's theory that "the radical changes of musical styles and languages throughout the 1960s [are] now seen as a reflection of postmodernism". Others have placed the beginnings of postmodernism in the arts, with particular reference to music, at around 1930.

== See also ==
- List of postmodernist composers
- 20th-century classical music
- 21st-century classical music
- Neoconservative postmodernism
