= Norman Fischer =

Norman Fischer may refer to:

- Zoketsu Norman Fischer (born 1946), American poet, writer, and Soto Zen priest
- Norman Fischer (cellist) (born 1949), American cellist

== See also ==
- Norman Fisher (disambiguation)
