= Norman Fisher =

Norman Fisher may refer to:

- Sir Norman Fenwick Warren Fisher (1879–1948), British civil servant
- Norman Fisher (architect) (1898–1949), South Australian architect, inaugural member of the Architects Board, with Herbert Jory
- Norman Fisher (educationalist) (1910–1972), British educationalist
- Norman Fisher (boxer) (1916–1991), New Zealand boxer
- Norman Fisher (public servant) (1936–1997), Australian civil servant

== See also ==
- Norman Fisher-Jones (born 1962), known primarily as Noko, English musician
- Zoketsu Norman Fischer (born 1946), American poet, writer, and Soto Zen priest
- Norman Fischer (cellist) (born 1949), American cellist
