= Robert Carl =

American composer

Robert Carl at the piano - from a concert at the Salinas Arts Center (Salinas, KS) in Feb. 2004.

Robert Carl (born July 12, 1954), in Bethesda, Maryland is an American composer who currently resides in Hartford, Connecticut. He was chair of the composition program at the Hartt School, University of Hartford.

He has held artist residencies at the Camargo Foundation in Cassis, France (1984 and 1993), Bogliasco Foundation near Genoa, Italy, (2000, 2007 and 2014), at the Rockefeller International Study Center in Bellagio, Italy, (1987), and at the Youkobo ArtSpace and Tokyo Wonder Site in 2007. US residencies include stays at Yaddo, the Djerassi, Ragdale and Ucross Foundations, and at the MacDowell and Millay. He was a recipient of the Copland Award in 1999.

== Music ==
Carl studied with Jonathan Kramer, George Rochberg, Ralph Shapey, Iannis Xenakis, Betsy Jolas, George Crumb, Richard Wernick, and Robert Morris.

From each of the first four respectively, the composer has commented that he feels he learned about time, history, counterpoint/phrasing, and form. His music finds its roots in the spirit of eclectic juxtapositions, transcendentalism, and experiment embodied in the output of Charles Ives and other American "ultramodernists", including Carl Ruggles.

Carl's music until 1997 tends to explore different styles, and to create unusual syntheses thereof. A history major as an undergraduate at Yale University, he has felt that the musical past is a fertile source to be manipulated for new expressive purposes. Duke Meets Mort (1992) is a saxophone quartet that interprets the harmonic changes of Duke Ellington’s Mood Indigo in the voice of Morton Feldman. Time/Memory/Shadow (1988) is a double trio (piano quintet and harp) based on a march written in the composer’s adolescence, which is slowly “excavated” in the course of the piece, and only revealed at the end.

From 1998, starting with Open for string trio, Carl's music has become less referential. Since 2001 he has developed a technique of basing his harmonies on the overtone series, with common partials above different fundamentals serving as pivots for progressions and modulations. In American Music in the Twentieth Century, critic Kyle Gann described Carl's more recent style: "(he) has settled into a more serene, meditative idiom, but still with a dissonant edge." More recent works that represent this approach include The Wind’s Trace Rests on Leaves and Waves (2005) for string quintet (premiered by the Miami String Quartet and Robert Black); Marfantasie (2004) for electric guitar and large ensemble; Shake the Tree for piano four-hands (2005); A Musical Enquiry Into the Sublime and Beautiful (2006–07) for chamber orchestra; La Ville Engloutie (2007) for wind ensemble; Fourth Symphony (2008); The Geography of Loss (2010) for soprano, baritone, chamber chorus, and instrumental octet; and Piano Quintet, "Search" (2012); and Piano Quartet, "Just Listen" (2018). Carl also frequently collaborates with sculptor Karen McCoy, creating sound components of installation art works, including pieces for the Sculpture Key Festivals of 2009 and 2010, and the 2013 Wintergreen Festival.

Carl's music has been released by Innova Recordings, New World Records, BMOPSound, Centaur Records, and Neuma Records, among others. He has received both the Charles Ives Fellowship and a Music Award from the American Academy of Arts and Letters, as well as grants from the NEA and Chamber Music America.

In August 2021 his opera Harmony, on a libretto by novelist Russell Banks, was premiered at the Seagle Festival in the Adirondacks. The work explores the historical meeting of Mark Twain and Charles Ives on the eve of the latter's betrothal to Harmony Twitchell.

== Writings ==
For 1994-2025, Carl was a critic for Fanfare magazine, where he wrote extensively on new music recordings. His critical writings are now devoted to essays published in his Substack, "Music in A Vast Space". He has completed a book on Terry Riley’s In C, published in 2009 by Oxford University Press. His interest in Japanese music (Carl often performs his own music on the shakuhachi) led to a residency in Tokyo in spring 2007, which resulted in interviews with 25 contemporary Japanese composers. In 2013, Carl published "Eight Waves a Composer Will Ride in This Century" on an emerging common practice period that he observes in twenty-first-century compositional practice, based on the universality of music technology, globalism, cross-disciplinary collaboration, and sonic essentialism. This essay has become the basis for, Music Composition in the 21st Century: A Practical Guide for New Common Practice, published by Bloomsbury in August 2020. He has also edited the final (posthumous) book of Jonathan Kramer, Postmodern Music, Postmodern Listening, also published by Bloomsbury.

== Selected works ==
Orchestral and Ensemble

- Symphony No. 2 "Liberty and/or Death" (1989–1992)
- Marfantasie for electric guitar and large ensemble (2004)
- A Musical Enquiry Into the Sublime and Beautiful for chamber orchestra (2006–2007)
- La Ville Engloutie for wind ensemble (2007)
- Symphony No. 4 "The Ladder" (2008)
- Rocking Chair Serenade for string orchestra (2013)
- Symphony No. 5, "Land" (2013)
- What's Underfoot for chamber orchestra (2016)
- Symphony No. 6, "Dome of Refuge" (2017)
- White Heron for orchestra (2012)
- Rocking Chair Serenade for string orchestra (2012)
- What's Underfoot for large ensemble (2016)
- Symphony No.7, "Infinity Avenue" for laptop, voices, and chamber orchestra (2020)
- Wind Hymn for orchestra (2025)

Chamber Music

- String Quartet No. 1 "A Path between Cloud and Light" (1985)
- Roundabout for contrabass and fixed electronic part (1988)
- Time/Memory/Shadow for double trio (piano, 2 violins, viola, cello, harp or synthesizer/sampler) (1988)
- Duke Meets Mort for saxophone quartet (1992)
- A Sampler of the Senses for viola, cello and piano (1994)
- Open for string trio (1998)
- Violin Sonata No. 2 "Angel Skating" (1999)
- String Quartet No. 2 "Fear of Death/Love of Life" (2001)
- Piano Trio No. 2 "The Blossom" (2002)
- Excavating the Perfect Farewell for viola and piano (2003)
- The Wind's Trace Rests on Leaves and Waves for string quintet (2005)
- A Clean Sweep for shakuhachi and Max/MSP (2005)
- River's Bend for flute duo (2012)
- Piano Quintet, "Search" (2013)
- Open/Empty for Pierrot sextet (2014)
- Jyun On for two shakuhachis and ichigenkin (2016)
- Piano Quartet, "Just Listen" (2018)
- String Quartet No.3, "Spatial-Temporal/Abstract-Visceral/Transcendent-Humane" (2020)

Piano

- Piano Sonata No.1 "Spiral Dances" (1984)
- Piano Sonata No. 2, "The Big Room" (1993–99)
- Braided Bagatelles for solo piano (2001)
- Shake the Tree for piano four-hands (2005)
- Piano Sonata No. 3, "Clouds of Clarification" (2014)
- What's Underfoot for solo piano

Vocal

- Our Heart and Home Is with Infinitude for soprano and piano (1998)
- Simic Songs, 15 Madrigals for 4 voices on poems of Charles Simic (2004)
- Geography of Loss, for soprano, baritone, chamber choir, and eight instrumentalists (2010)
- Harmony, opera in two acts (libretto by Russell Banks) (2018)
