= Ray Lev =

American musician (1912–1968)

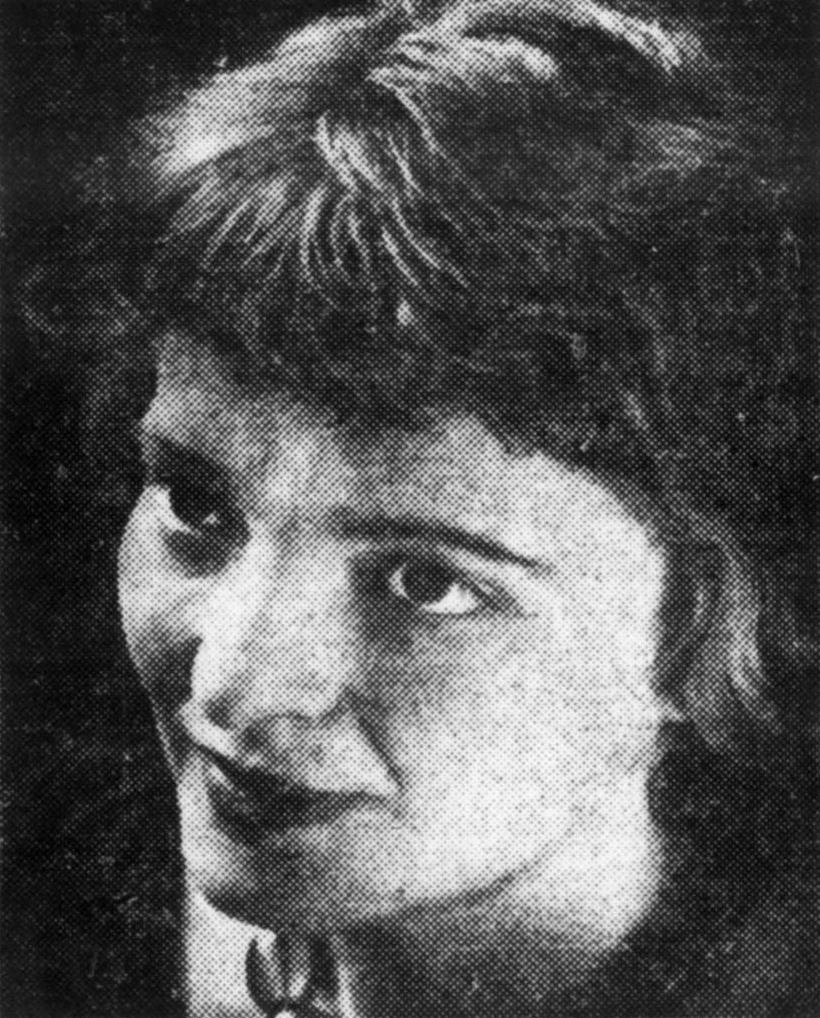
Lev c. 1949

Ray Lev (May 8, 1912 – May 20, 1968) was an American classical pianist. One year after her birth in Rostov-on-Don, Russia, her father, a synagogue cantor, and mother, a concert singer, brought her to the United States.

== Life ==
She started singing in her father's choir at an early age and after hearing a Ignacy Paderewski recital decided to become a pianist. Lev's early piano studies were with Waiter Ruel Cowles in New Haven, Connecticut and Gaston Déthier in New York. Her career was called "an old-fashioned success story" an example of unusual natural talent developed into high artistry. She won a New York Philharmonic Symphony Society scholarship while she was a student at James Madison High School. After winning the American Matthay Prize in 1930, she studied with Tobias Matthay in England from 1930 to 1933. She made her debut at age 17 in England performing Tchaikovsky's Piano Concerto No. 1 under Sir Landon Ronald. Thereafter, Lev returned to the United States, where she made her New York Carnegie Hall debut in 1933 with the National Orchestral Association under Leo Barzin. Her first solo recital was given at Town Hall here on March 17, 1934. "She did impressive things with her hands and also her brain, her imagination, and her musical sensibilities," a Herald Tribune reviewer wrote at the time. Lev played with such noted ensembles as the Budapest String Quartet and the Paganini, Gordon quartets. Her many recordings for Concert Hall Society prompted The Saturday Review to proclaim her "a second Myra Hess." Her annual recitals in Carnegie Hall were generally sold out; she also toured successfully in Europe, the United States, and Canada and performed on radio network broadcasts. In one such Carnegie Hall recital, on November 10, 1944, Lev gave the first complete traversal ever presented in that venue of the Six Pieces, op. 118 of Johannes Brahms. Lev also was a champion of modern works. For instance, in November 1945, again at Carnegie Hall, she gave the premiere of Louise Talma's Alleluia in Form of a Toccata and of 24-year-old Douglas Townsend's Sonatina No. 1, which she repeated in a March 31, 1946 recital at New York Times Hall broadcast live over WNYC. A November 1948 Carnegie Hall recital included the Hora movement from the 1937 Chassidic Suite of Jakob Schönberg.

Lev gave two command performances in London, England, performed for US President Franklin D. Roosevelt, and earned seven citations for patriotic service by extensively performing for US and allied armed forces during World War II. In 1948, however, she took a step that would negate the benefits of these public-spirited activities and that effectively would put an end to the progress of her career: she joined 31 other American musicians, artists, and writers in signing an open letter of solidarity with twelve Russian writers who had called for fellow Communists to declare themselves publicly. As a result, in 1950 she had the dubious distinction of being the sole classical pianist named in the Red Channels list of alleged communist sympathizers during the American Red Scare. (In between, in 1949, she had formed part of the Paul Robeson concert that ended in the Peekskill Riots.) Little information about her appears thereafter, and her name is largely forgotten today, although one reference suggests that she continued playing throughout her remaining life, including nearly annual Carnegie Hall recitals, and performed the Schumann Piano Concerto in April 1968, a month before her death. Some support for the former claim can be found in the Fall 1958 Juilliard Review, which indicates that on April 8 of that year she performed the premiere of Toccata for Piano by Juilliard alumnus Wallingford Riegger at Carnegie Hall. After the Khruschev revelations about Stalin in 1956 she suffered a nervous breakdown and bitterly regretted her political engagements - and refused to sign a petition against the Vietnam War in 1967. In 1964 she took up a teaching post at the Tokyo University of Fine Arts after spending a few years in England with her friends the Huxleys near London.She returned to New York and gave 2 recitals in 1967 and 1968, the latter with music only by Schumann. The fliers for her concerts were produced by Harry Abrams, whose wife Nina was a first cousin of Ray Lev.Presumably, however, she became primarily a teacher; her students include Anne Gamble, Aki Takahashi, Sophia Rosoff, composer Bob Telson, and the currently active American pianists Joel Sachs and Miriam Brickman. and Michael Steinberg.

Lev died by suicide in May 1968, a month after a Carnegie Hall performance of Schumann's Concerto.

== Carnegie Hall ==
Ray Lev appeared in recital at Carnegie Hall nine times between 1941 and 1967, and gave many more performances as a featured soloist in both orchestral and benefit concerts. Flyers for Lev's recitals are housed in the Carnegie Hall Archives, and feature both a promo photo taken by Eliascheff and a reproduction of a 1950 painting by Raphael Soyer.

== Recordings ==
In a 78 RPM set released by Musicraft Records in early 1939, Lev and clarinettist David Weber collaborated in the first recording of the Brahms Sonata in F minor, op. 120 no. 1, in its original instrumentation for clarinet and piano. After World War II, Lev began making phonograph records for the Concert Hall Society label, issued first on 78 RPM disks and then on LPs. She set down some adventurous literature for the day, including Schubert’s Piano Sonata in C Major, D. 840 (Reliquie) with the completion by Ernst Krenek, probably otherwise represented on records in this form only by the slightly later performance of Friedrich Wührer on Vox. Her recording has not appeared on compact disc, although Wührer's has received a private CD release copied from LP. Lev’s records that have achieved CD reissue include her 1946 account of Bach’s Concerto No. 5 in D minor after Vivaldi’s op. 3, no. 11, BWV 596, in her own transcription, and a waltz by Sergei Prokofiev, no. 2 from his Music for Children, op. 65.
