= Reliques =

Reliques may refer to:

- Jacobite Reliques (1817), a collection of Jacobite protest songs
- Reliques of Ancient English Poetry (1765), a collection of ballads and popular songs
- Reliques of Father Prout (1836), by Francis Sylvester Mahony

== See also ==
- Relics, items related to a saint or venerated person
- Reliquary, is a container for relics
- Relique or Piano Sonata in C major D. 840 (1825), by Franz Schubert
