= Sorrel Hays =

American pianist, composer, and artist (1941–2020)

Sorrel Hays (August 6, 1941 – February 9, 2020) was an American pianist, composer, filmmaker and artist.

== Life ==
Hays was born Doris Ernestine Hays in Memphis, Tennessee, and in 1985 adopted her grandmother's family name of Sorrel. She studied music with Harold Cadek at the University of Tennessee at Chattanooga, graduating in 1963. She continued her education for three years studying with Friedrich Wührer and Hedwig Bilgram at the Hochschule für Musik in Munich, Germany. She then studied with Paul Badura-Skoda and Rudolf Kolisch at the University of Wisconsin in Madison, graduating with a Master of Music degree.

After completing her studies, Hays taught at Cornell College in Iowa, and then moved to New York City where she studied with pianist Hilde Somer. In 1971 she won first prize in the Gaudeamus Competition for Interpreters of New Music at Rotterdam, and began an international career as a pianist. She is now known as one of the world's foremost performers of cluster piano music. She also collaborated with İlhan Mimaroğlu.

In 1998 Hays was director of a graduate program in electronic music at Yildiz University, Istanbul. She also taught as a guest lecturer at colleges and universities including Vassar and Brooklyn College.

== Works ==
Hays composed for stage, films, chamber ensemble and electronic performance. Selected works include:

- Our Giraffe, opera (libretto by Charles Flowers)
- Hands and Lights for piano strings with photocell activated switches and flashlights (1972)
- Tunings for string quartet
- The Glass Woman, opera
- Traveling, based on the microtonal fluctuations of tone generators
- Debushing America
- Take A Back Country Road electronic saxophone, oboe and DX-7
- Celebration of NO from Beyond Violence, electronic tape
- Southern Voices for soprano and orchestra

She also worked as a filmmaker, producing films including:

- Disarming the World-Pulling Its Leg, docudrama (1984)
- C.D., The Ritual of Civil Disobedience, experimental documentary (1986)

The composition and premiere of her work for soprano and orchestra Southern Voices is the subject of a documentary directed by George Stoney.

== Discography ==
Hays' music has been recorded and issued on media including:

- Dreaming the World, New World Records
- Soundbridge, "90's, A Calendar Bracelet", Opus One 152
- Tone Over Tone, "Past Present and Bits", Opus One 135
- Tellus #17, "Un-Necessary Music", Video Arts Music
- Voicings for Tape/Soprano/Piano, Smithsonian Folkways
- M.O.M. ‘N P.O.P. for three pianos, Centaur Records
- Sleepers, "Hush", Finnadar /Atlantic 90266
- Adoration of the Clash, "Sunday Nights", Finnadar/Atlantic
- Riverrun, "Celebration of NO" and "Sound Shadows", Wergo
- Sorrel Doris Hays Plays Henry Cowell, Townhall Records
- Live performance from the Cowell festival, Berkeley 1997, New Albion
