= Joseph Schuster (cellist) =

Russian-Jewish cellist (1903–1969)

Joseph Schuster (1903–1969) was a cellist born in Constantinople of Russian-Jewish descent.

== Biography ==
On a trip through Russia, the famous Russian composer Alexander Glazunov (1865-1936) heard young Schuster and was impressed with his talent. With Glazunov's help, Schuster entered the St. Petersburg Conservatory of Music at the age of 10 to study the cello. At the time of the Russian Revolution, his family fled to Berlin, where he continued his studies under Hugo Becker at the Berlin Hochschule. In 1929, Schuster was awarded the post of solo cellist in the Berlin Philharmonic Orchestra under Furtwängler, one of the youngest ever to hold that position (Gregor Piatigorsky, also born in 1903, was solo cellist from 1924-1929). He remained with the Berlin Philharmonic until 1934, when he moved to New York.

His New York debut was a critical sensation, and he was immediately invited to become solo cellist with the New York Philharmonic. One of the many highlights of his New York Philharmonic career was on November 14, 1943, when he was scheduled to play Strauss's Don Quixote under Bruno Walter. Walter was ill that da,y and as a replacement, a very young Leonard Bernstein conducted in his debut with the New York Philharmonic. Overwhelmingly enthusiastic response by the audience and press ensured Bernstein's career was launched.

After the 1943–1944 season, Schuster left the New York Philharmonic in order to devote himself entirely to solo concert work. He and his family—wife, Katherine Schuster, and son, John Schuster—moved to Beverly Hills, California in 1947. For the remainder of his career, Schuster traveled both nationally and internationally, giving recitals and playing with the great conductors and orchestras of the world. He performed on a 1720 Goffriller cello, an instrument formerly owned by Emanuel Feuermann; later, it would be played by Jascha Silberstein.

Schuster made numerous recordings of concertos, sonatas and other chamber works with accomplished partners, such as his American Vox set of Beethoven's complete music for cello and piano with Friedrich Wührer; his first recording for that label, with the same pianist, featured the Richard Strauss and first Brahms cello sonatas. Schuster also recorded concerti with well-known orchestras. He also appeared on radio and television programs throughout his career. He made nine enormously successful tours throughout Europe, Central and South America and Asia. Schuster was featured soloist under such conductors as Toscanini, Walter, Mitropoulos, Rodziński, Solti, Kubelík, Furtwängler, Bernstein, Jochum, Karajan, and Mehta.

Schuster died of an apparent heart attack in Los Angeles on February 16, 1969. According to a first-person account by historian Will Durant, Schuster invited Durant, his wife Ariel, and other friends for a preview of pieces of music he was preparing for his next international tour. Schuster performance a Tchaikovsky sonata for cello and piano, then just after beginning to play a piece by Beethoven, said “I don’t feel well,” laid down his cello, sat back in his chair, and died.
