= Karen McCoy =

American visual artist

Karen McCoy is an American visual artist whose work focuses on sculpture, environmental art, walking art, and land art. She resides in Kansas City, Missouri, where she is a professor emeritus in sculpture and social practice at the Kansas City Art Institute. She also taught sculpture and design at Williams College (1987-1994), Colby College (1987), and the University of Minnesota-Morris (1982-1985).

== Work ==
McCoy's sculptural works are created out of a combination of artistic practice and environmental activism, with focus on the ecological, geographical, cultural, and societal histories of the site at which the work is created. Works such as Giardino Galleggiante per Venezia (Floating Garden for Venice, expected 2021), Tree in Tree (2004, with Matt Dehaemers and members of the Osage Nation, Forest Park, St. Louis, MO), Island Gridded for Growth (2000, Jackson, WY), and Considering Mother's Mantle (1992, Syracuse, NY) are created by way of subtle physical alterations to the environment (i.e. - the planting of vegetation). In other projects, such as Seemingly Unconnected Events (2011, Wentworth-Coolidge Mansion State Historic Site, Portsmouth, NH, The Land Institute, Salina, KS and others) and the land art project The Taiwan Tangle: Space for Contemplating Carrying Capacity (2009, Guandu International Sculpture Festival, Guandu Nature Park, Taipei, Taiwan), McCoy uses reclaimed materials to create large-scale sculptures that address issues of global climate change, sustainability, and resource depletion.

She has created drawings made as a result of walking since 1987 (Mnemotopias or memory of place drawings) and several sculpture projects that involve listening and walking. In 2015, the New York City based Walk Exchange invited her to create a Sound and Sight Walk in Central Park, and she created a version in Kansas City for the Open Spaces exhibition in 2017. She is a member of the Walking Artists Network and her open source cut-and-fold paper Listening Trumpet may be found in the book Ways to Wander published by their research group, Footwork.

Karen McCoy frequently collaborates with composer Robert Carl, an ongoing body of work that includes her ear horns and listening post sculptures. Made from materials native to the site, the ear horns are used to amplify ambient sounds of their environment, often presented along with Carl's field recordings and ecoacoustic compositions. In 2010, Carl and McCoy collaborated on Talking Trees, a site-based interactive sculpture for the Spencer Museum of Art at the University of Kansas.

McCoy's work has been anthologized in numerous texts, including Beardsley, John (1998). Earthworks and Beyond (3rd ed.)., Sayre, Henry (2010). World of Art (6th ed.)., Cooper, Paul (2003). Gardens Without Boundaries., and Potteiger, Matthew; Purinton, Jamie (1998). Landscape Narratives., Artists Inhabit the Museum: A Decade of Commissions and Artist-In-Residence Projects at the Spencer Museum of Art, 2005-2015, among others. Her work is in the Oppenheimer Collection at the Nerman Museum of Contemporary Art.
