= Modernism (music) =

Changes in musical form during the early 20th century

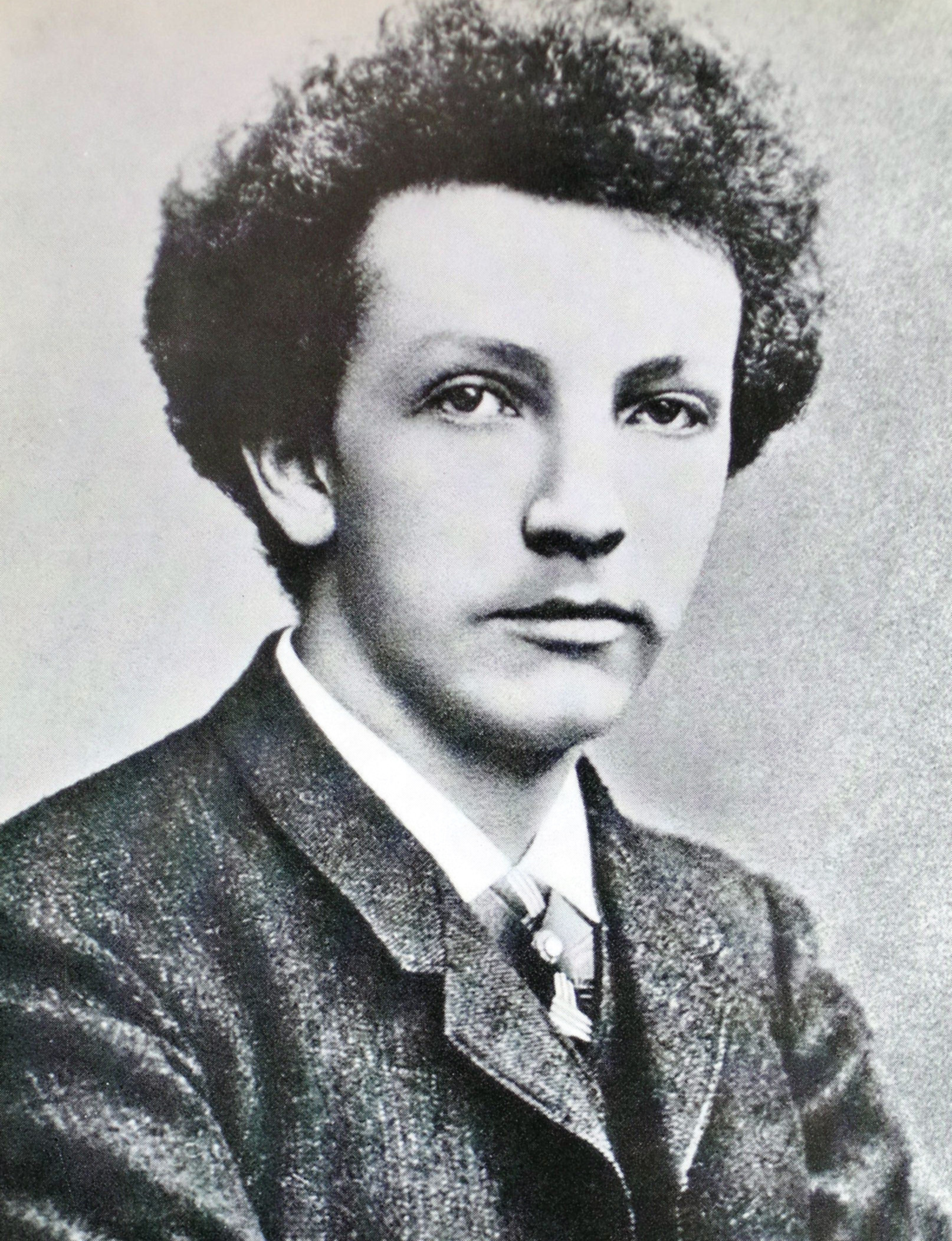
Richard Strauss in 1888, the year he composed Don Juan, a work emblematic of the élan vital and "breakaway mood" of modernism

In music, modernism is an aesthetic stance underlying the period of change and development in musical language that occurred around the turn of the 20th century, a period of diverse reactions in challenging and reinterpreting older categories of music, innovations that led to new ways of organizing and approaching aspects of music such as harmony, melody, sound, and rhythm, and changes in aesthetic worldviews in close relation to the larger identifiable period of modernism in the arts of the time. The operative word most associated with it is "innovation". Its leading feature is a "linguistic plurality", which is to say that no one musical language, or modernist style, ever assumed a dominant position.

Inherent within musical modernism is the conviction that music is not a static phenomenon defined by timeless truths and classical principles, but rather something which is intrinsically historical and developmental. While belief in musical progress or in the principle of innovation is not new or unique to modernism, such values are particularly important within modernist aesthetic stances.

— Edward Campbell (2010, p. 37) [emphasis added]

Examples include the celebration of Arnold Schoenberg's rejection of tonality in chromatic post-tonal and twelve-tone works and Igor Stravinsky's move away from symmetrical rhythm.

Authorities typically regard musical modernism as a historical period or era extending from about 1890 to 1930, and apply the term "postmodernism" to the period or era after 1930. For the musicologist Carl Dahlhaus the purest form was over by 1910, but other historians consider modernism to end with one or the other of the two world wars.

== Definitions ==
Carl Dahlhaus describes modernism as:

an obvious point of historical discontinuity ... The "breakthrough" of Mahler, Strauss, and Debussy implies a profound historical transformation ... If we were to search for a name to convey the breakaway mood of the 1890s (a mood symbolized musically by the opening bars of Strauss's Don Juan) but without imposing a fictitious unity of style on the age, we could do worse than revert to Hermann Bahr's term "modernism" and speak of a stylistically open-ended "modernist music" extending (with some latitude) from 1890 to the beginnings of our own twentieth-century modern music in 1910.

Eero Tarasti defines musical modernism directly in terms of "the dissolution of the traditional tonality and transformation of the very foundations of tonal language, searching for new models in atonalism, polytonalism or other forms of altered tonality", which took place around the turn of the century. Other scholars such as James Hepokoski, J. P. E. Harper-Scott, Daniel Grimley, Annika Forkert, Laurenz Lütteken and Sebastian Wedler have argued for a broader understanding of turn-of-the-century musical modernism, one that is not predominantly defined by the historiographical narrative of the emancipation of dissonance.

Daniel Albright proposes a definition of musical modernism as, "a testing of the limits of aesthetic construction" and presents the following modernist techniques or styles: Expressionism, the New Objectivity, Hyperrealism, Abstractionism, Neoclassicism, Neobarbarism, Futurism, and the Mythic Method.

Conductor and scholar Leon Botstein describes musical modernism as "...a consequence of the fundamental conviction among successive generations of composers since 1900 that the means of musical expression in the 20th century must be adequate to the unique and radical character of the age", which led to a reflection in the arts of the progress of science, technology and industry, mechanization, urbanization, mass culture and nationalism.

Similarly, Eric Pietro defines Modernism in his narrative Listening In: Music, Mind, and the Modernist as, “…a desire to find ‘ever more accurate representations of psychological states and processes’ by virtue of its links with the ‘historical crisis of the nineteenth century.’” From what we can understand with this information, there are two distinguishable concepts emphasizing Modernism: the first being music mirroring narrative depictions of the mind; and the second being music as a vocabulary that faces the possibility of describing psychological behaviors in language.

== Other usage ==
The term "modernism" (and the term "post-modern") has occasionally been applied to some genres of popular music, but not with any very clear definition.

For example, the cultural studies professor Andrew Goodwin writes that "given the confusion of the terms, the identification of postmodern texts has ranged across an extraordinarily divergent, and incoherent profusion of textual instances ... Secondly, there are debates within popular music about pastiche and authenticity. 'Modernism' means something quite different within each of these two fields ... This confusion is obvious in an early formative attempt to understand rock music in postmodern terms". Goodwin argues that instances of modernism in popular music are generally not cited because "it undermines the postmodern thesis of cultural fusion, in its explicit effort to preserve a bourgeois notion of Art in opposition to mainstream, 'commercial' rock and pop".

Author Domenic Priore writes that "the concept of Modernism was bound up in the very construction of the Greater Los Angeles area, at a time when the city was just beginning to come into its own as an international, cultural center"; it appears that the word is used here as an equivalent of the term "modern". Priore cites "River Deep – Mountain High" by Ike & Tina Turner (1966) and "Good Vibrations" by the Beach Boys (1966). Desiring "a taste of Modern, avant-garde R&B" for the latter's recording, group member and song co-writer Brian Wilson considered the music "advanced rhythm and blues", but received criticism from his bandmates, who derided the track for being "too Modern" during its making.

== See also ==
- List of modernist composers
- Absolute music
- Avant-garde music
- Experimental music
- Expressionist music
- Futurism (music)
- History of music
- Neoclassicism (music)
- Neoconservative postmodernism
- Neue Musik
- Philosophy of music
