= String Quartet No. 3 (Rochberg) =

George Rochberg's String Quartet No. 3 is an important piece in American contemporary music literature. Written in 1971 and premiered on May 15, 1972, by the Concord String Quartet, the third string quartet was an important move away from serialism for the American composer.

== Background of composition ==
Early in his career George Rochberg wrote in a total serialist style that was popular with post World War II composers. Rochberg's first and second quartets are written in this modernist style. Then in 1961 tragedy struck when Rochberg's son became ill with an ultimately fatal brain tumor. His son's death three years later left the composer deeply changed and struggling to compose. His eventual conclusion that he was unable to adequately express his profound grief and loss through serialism led him towards his more mature style, an aesthetic which often mixes tonality and atonality and has sometimes been labeled “neo-romanticism.” Rochberg described his goal in this new style as an attempt to achieve “the most potent and effective way to translate my musical energy into the clearest and most direct patterns of feeling and thought.”

== Style and structure ==
String Quartet No. 3 is composed in five movements, with the first two and last two movements played without pause. This ultimately results in the work being heard in three large sections. Sections of atonality are superimposed with tonal and expressionist sections. The string quartet is written in a modified arch form.

=== Part A ===
The distinctive opening motif recurs at several important places in the first and fifth movements of the quartet.

==== I. Introduzione: Fantasia ====
As in the last movement, this movement presents the emotional contours of the third quartet in microcosm. The movement comprises six ideas repeated to form eighteen short sections. The work starts off with a highly charged glissando motif, but quickly passes through sections of lyric tonality, atonality, and florid ornamentation.

==== II. March ====
This movement is a dissonant march which has been compared to Bartok. It begins without pause after the first movement.

=== Part B ===
==== III. Variations ====
This central movement forms the cornerstone of the arch form. It is composed of new material in a traditional theme and variations form. Rochberg said this movement drew from “the harmonic/polyphonic palette of the Classical and Romantic traditions.”

=== Part C ===
==== IV. March ====
The central movement is followed by this second march, which is thematically connected to the first, but includes further development of the ideas.

==== V. Finale: Scherzos and Serenades ====
This finale, which completes the quartet's arch form, is also written in an internally palindromic form. The scherzo is highly chromatic in character, although still tonal. It is followed by the expressive serenade. After several interruptions from the scherzo theme, the original glissando motive from the beginning returns to complete the work.

== Transcendental Variations ==
Following a suggestion by Vilem Sokol, in 1975 Rochberg arranged the third movement for orchestra under the title Transcendental Variations, highlighting its relation to Rochberg's vision of timelessness. Christopher Lyndon-Gee, who recorded them with the Saarbrücken Radio Symphony, considers it thoroughly recomposed in terms of registration and sonorities.

== Critical reception and influence ==
Rochberg's String Quartet No. 3 was immediately controversial. Its aesthetic, which appeared to draw from older tonal music, was heavily criticized by Rochberg's academic colleagues. The composer's work was described by some major critics, such as Andrew Porter of The New Yorker, as “almost irrelevant.”

While academics scoffed at the work, Rochberg's String Quartet No. 3 was very popular with audiences and musicians. During the 1970s the piece received many performances, and the Concord String Quartet quickly commissioned three more quartets.
