= Friedrich Wührer =

Austrian-German pianist (1900–1975)

Friedrich Wührer (29 June 1900 – 27 December 1975) was an Austrian-German pianist and piano pedagogue. He was a close associate and advocate of composer Franz Schmidt, whose music he edited and, in the case of the works for left hand alone, revised for performance with two hands; he was also a champion of the Second Viennese School and other composers of the early 20th century. His recorded legacy, however, centers on German romantic literature, particularly the music of Franz Schubert.

== Biography ==
Born in Vienna, Wührer began piano study at age six with an Austrian teacher named Marius Szudelsky; after entering the Vienna Academy in 1915, Wührer continued studying piano with Franz Schmidt, along with taking courses in conducting under Ferdinand Löwe and music theory under Joseph Marx. His performing career began in the early 1920s, and he toured Europe and the United States in 1923.

Wührer was a founder of the International Society for Contemporary Music in Vienna. He formed friendships with composers Hans Pfitzner and Max Reger, and became associated with Arnold Schoenberg and his circle, participating in performances of Schoenberg's setting of 15 poems from Das Buch der hängenden Gärten, Op. 15; his Pierrot lunaire as part of a touring company presenting the work in Spain; and Webern's Pieces for Cello and Piano, op. 11. Wührer also performed music by Béla Bartók, Igor Stravinsky, Sergei Prokofiev, and Paul Hindemith. On 3 July 1930 he performed Schoenberg student Paul Pisk's Suite for Piano in the first broadcast of that composer's music by the British Broadcasting Corporation. Wührer made his Salzburg Festival debut in 1938. In 1939, as Paul Wittgenstein, who commissioned the work, had fled Austria, Wührer performed in the premiere of Schmidt's Quintet for piano, violin, clarinet, viola, and cello in A major, albeit in his own arrangement for two hands rather than, as originally written for piano, left hand alone. Thereafter, Wührer performed all the Schmidt left-hand compositions in his own two-hand arrangements.

He and Wittgenstein viewed each other with animosity; Wittgenstein accused Wührer of being an enthusiastic Nazi who later tried to cover it up, and Wührer disparaged Wittgenstein's personality and pianism. Whether for this or some other reason, the recital programmes did not, as Wührer had promised Wittgenstein, make any note of the latter's exclusive rights to the works, and as a descendant of Jews, Wittgenstein had no recourse in Nazi-governed countries.

Wührer continued his advocacy for modern works at least into middle age. For instance, he gave the premiere of Pfitzner's Sechs Studien für das Pianoforte, Op. 51, of which he was the dedicatee, shortly after its composition in 1943 and in the 1950s, he performed Kurt Hessenberg's Piano Concerto, Op. 21 (1939). Nonetheless, notwithstanding his pioneering work for music of the Second Viennese School and other moderns of his day, Wührer's principal focus as a performer, his posthumous reputation, and his recorded legacy came to rest on performances of music from the romantic era, particularly works in the German and Austrian traditions.

Later in life, Wührer was a juror at the Second Van Cliburn International Piano Competition in 1966, which awarded first prize to Radu Lupu. Wührer was also a member of the piano jury at the 1968 Queen Elisabeth International Music Competition. Wührer's son, also named Friedrich, was a violinist and conductor who made classical records.

He died in Mannheim.

== Pedagogy ==
Outside the concert hall, Wührer was a teacher in Vienna, the Hochschule für Musik und Darstellende Kunst Mannheim in 1934, Kiel in 1936, the Salzburg Mozarteum in 1948, and finally at the Staatliche Hochschule für Musik in Munich. He also regularly taught master classes at the Salzburg Mozarteum. He was denied an academy teaching position in East Germany in 1952, however, on grounds that he had been a leading Nazi in Austria during World War II.

Wührer's students included composers Sorrel Hays, Helmut Bieler, and Richard Wilson; pianists Geoffrey Parsons, Frieda Valenzi, and Felicitas Karrer (who described him as having an unusually well-balanced left hand); and harpsichordist Hedwig Bilgram.

== Publications ==
Among Wührer's editorial activities, he wrote Masterpieces of Piano Music (Wilhelmshaven, 1966); compiled a collection of works by old masters; and prepared editions of the Chopin Etudes, polonaises by Wilhelm Friedemann Bach, and the piano music of Franz Schmidt. Claiming to be respecting the composer's own wishes, he created two-hand redistributions of the left-hand works that Schmidt had written for Paul Wittgenstein, although Wittgenstein evidently voiced strong objections. Besides editing the Etudes, Wührer wrote 18 Studies on Chopin Etudes in Contrary Motion (1958) as a pedagogical work for equalising the facility of both hands. Wührer also composed and published cadenzas for Mozart's piano concerti in C major, K. 467; C minor, K. 491; and D major, K. 537.

== Discography ==
In 1935, Wührer performed piano solos for the Carmine Gallone film Wenn die Musik nicht wär, which is also known in Germany as Liszt Rhapsody and in English-speaking countries as If It Were Not for Music.

Wührer made numerous commercial phonograph records. While his discography includes 78 rpm records, such releases are outnumbered by his output during the early LP era, which was mostly for the American Vox label. Among his LP recordings was the first nominally complete cycle of Schubert's piano sonatas. It omitted a few fragmentary works, but it offered Ernst Krenek's completion of the C major sonata, D. 840 (Reliquie), possibly otherwise represented on records only by Ray Lev's Concert Hall Society account of similar vintage. In recent years, some of Wührer's LP recordings have emerged on compact disc. Vox bypassed his Schubert sonata cycle in favor of one recorded a few years later in stereo by Walter Klien, but a third party, Bearac Reissues, appears to have issued compact disc editions of the set copied from LPs. Downloads of the Schubert recordings in .mp3 format are also available through Amazon.com.

The following lists contain the bulk of Wührer's recordings. Unless specified otherwise, all 78 RPM discs were 10" discs, and all LPs were monaural 12" discs. The Vox Boxes were all three-record sets. CD issues mostly derive from radio broadcasts; CD releases of material originally appearing on analogue discs are noted in the sections for their original formats, with the CD section listing only recordings not released in other formats.

=== 78 rpm ===
External audio
- Shellac recordings with Friedrich Wührer in the Online Archive of the Österreichische Mediathek

- Beethoven: Rondo a Capriccio in G (Rage over a lost penny), Op. 129. HMV E.G.6905, 10"
- Beethoven: Violin Sonata No. 7, Wolfgang Schneiderhan violin, Friedrich Wührer, piano Columbia LX 1190-3 12"
- Brahms: Liebeslieder Waltzes, Op. 52. With Hermann von Nordberg, piano, and Irmgard Seefried, Elisabeth Höngen, Hugo Meyer-Welfing, and Hans Hotter. English Columbia L.X. 8628–8631, 4 12". This recording has seen several reissues on CD, including Preiser 90356
- Reger: Gavotte in E major, Op. 82, No. 5. HMV E.G.6122
- Reger: Humoreske in C major, Op. 20, No. 4. HMV E.G.6122
- Schumann Allegretto from Violin Sonata in A major Op 105, Wolfgang Schneiderhan violin, Friedrich Wührer piano, Columbia LX 1193 12"
- Scriabin: Étude in D-sharp minor, Op. 8, No. 12. HMV E.G. 6224
- Scriabin: Nocturnes, Op. 5 — Nos. 1 in F-sharp minor and 2 in A major. HMV E.G.6297
- Scriabin: Waltz in F minor, Op. 1. HMV E.G.6224

=== LP ===
- Beethoven: Bagatelles, Op. 33 — Nos. 3 in F major, 4 in A major. Melodiya 10 46829 006
- Beethoven: Bagatelles, Op. 119 — No. 5 in C minor. Melodiya 10 46829 006
- Beethoven: Cello Sonatas (Op. 5, Op. 69, and Op. 102 complete). With Joseph Schuster, cello. Vox VoxBox SVBX 58, 3 stereo 12" LPs
- Beethoven: Fantasy in C minor for Piano, Orchestra, and Chorus, Op. 80 (Choral Fantasy). With Akademie Kammerchor and Vienna Symphony Orchestra under Clemens Krauss. Vox PL 6480 and 10,640. This recording has seen CD reissues on Tuxedo Music 1038 and Preiser 90553
- Beethoven: Piano Concerto No. 1 in C major, Op. 15. With Vienna Pro Musica Orchestra under Hans Swarowsky. Originally mono; reissued as Vox STPL 513.070, fake stereo, and on CD in Tahra TAH 704–707
- Beethoven: Piano Concerto No. 2 in B-flat major, Op. 19. With Stuttgart Pro Musica Orchestra under Walther Davisson. Vox PL 9570; reissued as Vox STPL 513.060, fake stereo, and on CD in Tahra TAH 704–707
- Beethoven: Piano Concerto No. 3 in C minor, Op. 37. With Stuttgart Pro Musica Orchestra under Walther Davisson. Vox PL 9570; reissued as Vox STPL 513.060, fake stereo. Also Orbis CX 20320, 10", and on CD in Tahra TAH 704–707
- Beethoven: Piano Concerto No. 4 in G major, Op. 58. (1) With Bamberg Symphony Orchestra under Jonel Perlea. Vox PL 10,640. Reissued by Pristine Classical in downloadable MP3 and FLAC format as PASC139, dubbed from an LP copy; Pristine gives the recording dates as 12–13 September 1957 and the release date as 1958. Also on CD in Tahra TAH 704–707 (2) With Austrian Symphony Orchestra under Karl Randolf. Remington R-199-72 (3) With Vienna Symphony Orchestra under Hans Swarowsky. Club National du Disque 1801
- Beethoven: Piano Concerto No. 5 in E-flat major, Op. 73 (Emperor). With Vienna Pro Musica Orchestra under Heinrich Hollreiser. Vox GBY 11740 and on CD in Tahra TAH 704–707
- Beethoven: Piano Sonata no. 23 in F minor, Op. 57 (Appassionata). Orbis CX 20 820 (designated on the label as a Vox recording)
- Beethoven: Piano Sonatas nos. 30 in E major, Op. 109; 31 in A-Flat major, op 110; 32 in C minor, Op. 111. Vox PL 9900 and on CD in Tahra TAH 704–707
- Beethoven: Rondo in B-flat major, Op. posth. With Vienna Pro Musica Orchestra under Hans Swarowsky. Originally mono; reissued as Vox STPL 513.070, fake stereo
- Beethoven: Triple Concerto in C major for Piano, Violin, Cello and Orchestra, Op. 56. With Bronislav Gimpel, violin; Joseph Schuster, cello; and Wurttembergisches Staatsorchester under Walther Davisson. Vox PL 11.660 and on CD in Tahra TAH 704–707
- Beethoven: Variations in D major, Op. 76 (Turkish March). Vox GBY 11740
- Beethoven: Variations on "Bei Mannern welche Liebe fuhlen" from Mozart's Die Zauberflöte. With Joseph Schuster, cello. In Vox VoxBox SVBX 58, 3 12" stereo
- Beethoven: Variations on "Ein Madchen oder Weibehen" from Mozart's Die Zauberflöte. With Joseph Schuster, cello. In Vox VoxBox SVBX 58, 3 12" stereo
- Beethoven: Variations on "See the Conquering Hero Comes" from Handel's Judas Maccabeus. With Joseph Schuster, cello. In Vox VoxBox SVBX 58, 3 12" stereo
- Brahms: Cello Sonata No. 1 in E minor, Op. 38. With Joseph Schuster, cello. Vox PL 9910. According to the album notes, this LP was Schuster's first for Vox.
- Brahms: Piano Concerto No. 1 in D minor, Op. 15. With Vienna State Philharmonia under Hans Swarowsky. Vox PL 8000; also Vox GBY 12 180. An excerpt from this recording's first movement saw CD release on a Vox disc entitled The Best of Brahms.
- Brahms: Piano Concerto No. 2 in B-flat major, Op. 83. With Pro Musica Orchestra, Stuttgart under Walther Davisson. Vox PL 9790
- Brahms: Variations on a Theme of Paganini, Op. 35. Vox PL 8850
- Brahms: Violin Sonatas Nos. 1 in G major, Op. 78; 2 in A major, Op. 100; and 3 in D minor, Op. 108]. With Wolfgang Schneiderhan, violin. Deutsche Grammophon 18295 (1 and 2) and 18144 (3). At least one of the first two sonatas also appeared on late DG 78 RPM discs.
- Chopin: Etudes, Op. 25. Melodiya 10 46829 006
- Dvořák: Piano Concerto in G minor, Op. 33. With Vienna Symphony Orchestra under Rudolf Moralt. Vox PL 7630
- Grieg: Piano Concerto in A minor, Op. 16. (1) 1944 radio broadcast with Vienna Philharmonic under Karl Böhm. Urania UR-RS 7–15 Also released pseudonymously as by Gerhard Stein with Berlin Symphony Orchestra under Karl List on Royale 1264 (2) With Pro Musica Symphony, Vienna under Heinrich Hollreiser. Vox PL 9000; also in Vox Box VBX 1
- Haydn: Andante and Variations in F minor, Hob. XVII, No. 6. Melodiya 10 46829 006
- Liszt: Grandes Etudes de Paganini — \No. 6 in A minor (after Caprice no. 24). Vox PL 8850
- Mendelssohn: Piano Concerto No. 2 in D minor, Op. 40. Vox PL 6570
- Prokofiev: Piano Concerto No. 2 in G minor, Op. 16. Vox
- Prokofiev: Piano Concerto No. 3 in C major, Op. 26. With Southwest German Radio Orchestra, Baden-Baden under Michael Gielen. Vox PL 12.190; reissued as Vox (also Yorkshire) STPL 513.130, fake stereo
- Rubinstein: Piano Concerto No. 4 in D minor, Op. 70. With Vienna State Philharmonia under Rudolf Moralt. Vox PL 7780
- Schubert: Nocturne in E-flat major, Op. 148. With Barchet Quartet. Vox PL 8970; also Dover HCR-5206, Parnass 70068
- Schubert: Piano Quintet in A major, Op. 114 (Trout). With Rinhold Barchet, violin; Hermann Hirschfelder, viola; Helmut Reimann, cello; and Karl Heinz Krüger, double bass. Vox PL 8970; also Dover HCR-5206, Parnass 70068
- Schubert: Piano Sonatas. These recordings have received a private issue on CD by Bearac Reissues.
  - D. 157 in E major. In Vox Box VBX-11
  - D. 279 in C major (1815). Vox PL 9620; also in Vox Box VBX-9
  - D. 459 in E major. Vox PL 9800; also in Vox Box VBX-11
  - D. 537 in A minor (Op. 164). Vox PL 9130; also in Vox Box VBX-10
  - D. 557 in A-flat major. In Vox Box VBX-11
  - D. 566 in E minor. In Vox Box VBX-11
  - D. 568 in E-flat major (Op. 122). Vox PL 8820; also in Vox Box VBX-10
  - D. 575 in B major (Op. 147). Vox PL 8420; also Dover HCR-5207 and in Vox Box VBX-9
  - D. 625 in F minor. Vox PL 9800; also in Vox Box VBX-11
  - D. 664 in A major (Op. 120). Vox PL 8590; also in Vox Box VBX-10
  - D. 784 in A minor (Op. 143). Vox PL 8210; also in Vox Box VBX-9
  - D. 840 in C major (Reliquie); compl. Ernst Krenek. In Vox Box VBX-11
  - D. 845 in A minor (Op. 42). Vox PL 9620; also in Vox Box VBX-9
  - D. 850 in D major (Op. 53). Vox PL 8820; also in Vox Box VBX-10
  - D. 894 in G major (Op. 78). Vox PL 8590; also in Vox Box VBX-10
  - D. 958 in C minor (Op. posth.). Vox PL 8420; also Dover HCR-5207 and in Vox Box VBX-9
  - D. 959 in A major (Op. posth.). Vox PL 9130; also in Vox Box VBX-10
  - D. 960 in B-flat major (Op. posth.). Vox PL 8210; also in Vox VBX-9
- Schumann: Davidsbündlertänze, Op. 6. Vox PL 8860
- Schumann: Piano Sonata No. 3 in F minor, Op. 14 (Concerto Without Orchestra). Vox PL 8860
- Schumann: Studies after Caprices by Paganini, Op. 3. Vox PL 8850
- Scriabin: Piano Concerto in F-sharp minor, Op. 20. With Pro Musica Orchestra of Vienna under Hans Swarowsky. Vox PL 9200
- Richard Strauss: Cello Sonata in F minor, Op. 6. With Joseph Schuster, cello. Vox PL 9910. According to the album notes, this LP was Schuster's first for Vox.
- Tchaikovsky: Piano Concerto No. 1 in B-flat minor, Op. 23. With Pro Musica Symphony of Vienna under Heinrich Hollreiser. Vox PL 9000
- Tchaikovsky: Piano Concerto No. 2 in G major, Op. 44. With Pro Musica Symphony of Vienna under Heinrich Hollreiser. Vox PL 9200
- Weber: Piano Concerti Nos. 1 in C major, Op. 11 and 2 in E-lfat major, Op. 32. With Pro Musica Symphony of Vienna under Hans Swarowsky. Vox PL 8140

=== CD ===
- Brahms: Intermezzi, Op. 117. Vogue 672001
- Brahms: Variations and Fugue on a Theme by Handel, Op. 24. Vogue 672001
- Chopin: Etudes, Op. 25. Dante HPC 094
- Haydn: Variations, Hob. XVII #6. Dante HPC 094
- Schmidt: Variations on a Theme of Beethoven for Piano, Left Hand and Orchestra. With Berlin Philharmonic Orchestra under Eugen Jochum. Tahra 382–385
- Schubert: Piano Sonata D. 784 in A minor (Op. 143). Vogue 672001 (from a French radio broadcast, not part of the complete cycle, supra)
- Schumann: Piano Concerto in A minor, Op. 54. With Berlin Radio Symphony Orchestra under Hermann Abendroth. Arlecchino 164; also Berlin Classics 0120.052
