= George Rochberg =

American composer

George Rochberg (July 5, 1918 – May 29, 2005) was an American composer of contemporary classical music. Long a serial composer, Rochberg abandoned the technique after his teenage son died in 1964, saying it had proved inadequate to express his grief and was empty of expressive power. By the 1970s, Rochberg's use of tonal passages in his music had provoked controversy among critics and fellow composers. A professor at the University of Pennsylvania until 1983, Rochberg chaired its music department until 1968. He became the first Annenberg Professor of the Humanities in 1978.

== Life ==
Born in Paterson, New Jersey, Rochberg attended first the Mannes College of Music, where his teachers included George Szell and Hans Weisse, then the Curtis Institute of Music, where he studied with Rosario Scalero and Gian Carlo Menotti. He served in the United States Army in the infantry during World War II. He was Jewish.

Rochberg chaired the music department at the University of Pennsylvania until 1968 and continued to teach there until 1983. In 1978, he was named the first Annenberg Professor of the Humanities.

He married Gene Rosenfeld in 1941, and had two children, Paul and Francesca. In 1964, his son died of a brain tumor.

Rochberg died in Bryn Mawr, Pennsylvania, in 2005, aged 86. Most of his works are in the archive of the Paul Sacher Foundation in Basel, Switzerland. Some can also be found in the Music Division of the New York Public Library, the Library of Congress, Lincoln Center in New York City, the University of Pennsylvania, the Curtis Institute of Music, and the City University of New York.

== Music ==
A longtime exponent of serialism, Rochberg abandoned this compositional technique upon the death of his teenage son in 1964. He said he had found serialism expressively empty and that it had proved an inadequate means for him to express his grief and rage. By the 1970s, Rochberg had become controversial for the tonal passages in his music. His use of tonality first became widely known through the String Quartet No. 3 (1972), which includes a set of variations in the style of late Beethoven. Another movement of the quartet contains passages reminiscent of Gustav Mahler. This caused critics to classify him as a neoromantic composer. He compared atonality to abstract art and tonality to concrete art and compared his artistic evolution with the painter Philip Guston's, calling "the tension between concreteness and abstraction" a fundamental issue for both of them. His music has also been described as neoconservative postmodernism

Of the works Rochberg composed early in his career, his Symphony No. 2 (1955–56) stands out as one of the most accomplished serial compositions by an American composer. He is perhaps best known for his String Quartets Nos. 3–6 (1972–78). Rochberg conceived Nos. 4–6 as a set and named them the "Concord Quartets" after the Concord String Quartet, which premiered and recorded the works. No. 6 includes a set of variations on Pachelbel's Canon in D.

A few of his works were collages of quotations from other composers. "Contra Mortem et Tempus", for example, contains passages from Pierre Boulez, Luciano Berio, Edgard Varèse and Charles Ives.

Symphonies Nos. 1, 2, and 5, and the Violin Concerto were recorded in 2001–2002 by the Rundfunk-Sinfonieorchester Saarbrücken and conductor Christopher Lyndon-Gee and released on the Naxos label.

=== Legacy ===
For notable students See: List of music students by teacher: R to S#George Rochberg.

James Freeman, musician and teacher at Swarthmore College, said of Rochberg and serialism: "If George Rochberg can do something like that, there's nothing that I can't do and get away with it. I don't have to write 12-tone music; I can if I want to. I can write stuff that sounds like Brahms. I can do anything I want. I'm free. And that was an extraordinary feeling in the late 1960s for young composers, I think, many of whom felt really constrained to write serial music."

== Writings ==
Rochberg's collected essays were published by the University of Michigan Press in 1984 as The Aesthetics of Survival. A revised and expanded edition, published shortly before his death, was awarded an ASCAP Deems Taylor Award in 2006. Selections from his correspondence with the Canadian composer István Anhalt were published in 2007 by Wilfrid Laurier University Press. His memoir, Five Lines, Four Spaces, was published by the University of Illinois Press in 2009.

== Works ==
=== Stage ===
- The Confidence Man, an opera in two parts (1982); libretto by Gene Rochberg, based on the novel of the same name by Herman Melville

=== Orchestral ===
- Symphonies
  - Symphony No. 1 (1948–49; revised 1977; 2003)
  - Symphony No. 2 (1955–56)
  - Symphony No. 3, for double chorus, chamber chorus, soloists, and large orchestra (1966–69)
  - Symphony No. 4 (1976)
  - Symphony No. 5 (1984)
  - Symphony No. 6 (1986–87)
- Cantio Sacra, for small orchestra (1954)
- Cheltenham Concerto, for small orchestra (1958)
- Imago Mundi, for large orchestra (1973)
- Night Music, for orchestra with cello solo (1948) (based on 2nd movement of Symphony No. 1)
- Music for the Magic Theater, for small orchestra (1965–69)
- Time-Span I (1960)
- Time-Span II (1965)
- Transcendental Variations, for string orchestra (based on 3rd movement of String Quartet No. 3) (1975)
- Zodiac (A Circle of 12 Pieces), (1964–65) (orchestration of the piano work Twelve Bagatelles)

=== Concerti ===
- Clarinet Concerto (1996)
- Oboe Concerto (1983), written for and premiered by Joe Robinson
- Violin Concerto (1974; rev. 2001), written for and premiered by Isaac Stern with the Pittsburgh Symphony Orchestra, Donald Johanos conducting. The concerto was commissioned by the Steinfirst family in memory of Donald Steinfirst, the music critic for over 35 years of the Pittsburgh Post-Gazette which participated in the commission. Long a friend of Mr. Steinfirst, Isaac Stern consulted with the family. He premiered and recorded the concerto in Pittsburgh, and included it in his repertoire for several years.
- Eden: Out of Time and Out of Space, for guitar and ensemble (1998)

=== Wind ensemble ===
- Black Sounds, for winds and percussion (1965)
- Apocalyptica, for large wind ensemble (1964)

=== Chamber ===
==== 2 players ====
- Duo for Oboe and Bassoon (1946; rev. 1969)
- Duo Concertante, for violin and cello (1955–59)
- Dialogues, for clarinet and piano (1957–58)
- La bocca della verita, for oboe and piano (1958–59); version for violin and piano (1964)
- Ricordanza Soliloquy, for cello and piano (1972)
- Slow Fires of Autumn (Ukiyo II), for flute and harp (1978–79)
- Viola Sonata (1979)
- Between Two Worlds (Ukiyo III), for flute and piano (1982)
- Violin Sonata (1988)
- Muse of Fire, for flute and guitar (1989–90)
- Ora pro nobis, for flute and guitar (1989)
- Rhapsody and Prayer, for violin and piano (1989)

==== 3 players ====
- Piano trios
  - Piano Trio No. 1 (1963)
  - Piano Trio No. 2 (1985)
  - Piano Trio No. 3 Summer (1990)
- Trio for Clarinet, Horn, and Piano (1980) see recording below

==== 4 players ====
- String quartets
  - String Quartet No. 1 (1952)
  - String Quartet No. 2, with soprano (1959–61)
  - String Quartet No. 3 (1972)
  - String Quartet No. 4 (1977)
  - String Quartet No. 5 (1978)
  - String Quartet No. 6 (1978)
  - String Quartet No. 7, with baritone (1979)
- Contra Mortem et Tempus, for violin, flute, clarinet, and piano (1965)
- Piano Quartet (1983)

==== 5 or more players ====
- Chamber Symphony for Nine Instruments (1953)
- Serenata d'estate, for six instruments (1955)
- Electrikaleidoscope, for an amplified ensemble of flute, clarinet, cello, piano, and electric piano (1972)
- Quintet for piano and string quartet (1975)
- Octet: A Grand Fantasia, for flute, clarinet, horn, piano, violin, viola, cello, and double bass (1980)
- String Quintet (1982)
- To the Dark Wood, for wind quintet (1985)

=== Instrumental ===
- 50 Caprice Variations, for violin (1970)
- Ukiyo-E, for harp (1973)
- American Bouquet, for guitar (1991)

=== Keyboard ===
- Arioso (1959)
- Bartokiana (1959)
- Book of Contrapuntal Pieces for Keyboard Instruments (1979)
- Carnival Music, for piano (1971)
- Circles of Fire, for two pianos (1996–1997)
- Four Short Sonatas, for piano (1984)
- Nach Bach: Fantasia, for harpsichord or piano (1966)
- Partita-Variations, for piano (1976)
- Sonata Seria, for piano (1948/98)
- Sonata-Fantasia, for piano (1956)
- Three Elegiac Pieces, for piano (1945/48/98)
- Twelve Bagatelles, for piano (1952)
- Variations on an Original Theme, for piano (1941)

=== Vocal/Choral ===
- Behold, My Servant, for mixed chorus, a capella (1973)
- Blake Songs, for soprano and chamber ensemble (1957; rev. 1962)
- David, the Psalmist, for tenor and orchestra (1954)
- Eleven Songs to Poems of Paul Rochberg, for mezzo-soprano and piano (1969)
- Fantasies, for voice and piano (1971)
- Four Songs of Solomon, for voice and piano (1946)
- Music for 'The Alchemist', for soprano and eleven players (1966; rev. 1968)
- Passions [According to the Twentieth Century], for singers, jazz quintet, brass ensemble, percussion, piano, and tape (1967)
- Phaedra, monodrama for mezzo-soprano and orchestra (1973–74)
- Sacred Song of Reconciliation (Mizmor L'piyus), for baritone and orchestra (1970)
- Seven Early Love Songs, for voice and piano (1991)
- Songs in Praise of Krishna, for soprano and piano (1970)
- Songs of Inanna and Dumuzi, for alto and piano (1977)
- Tableaux, for soprano, two speakers, small men's chorus, and twelve players (1968)
- Three Cantes Flamencos, for high baritone (1969)
- Three Psalms, for mixed chorus, a capella (1954)

== Awards and recognitions ==
- 1950–1951 – Fulbright Fellow
- 1950–52 – Fellow of American Academy in Rome
- 1952 – George Gershwin Memorial Award for Night Music
- 1956 – Society for the Publication of American Music award for String Quartet No. 1
- 1956 – Guggenheim Fellowship
- 1959 – First prize in Italian ISCM International Music Competition for Cheltenham Concerto
- 1961 – Naumburg Recording Award for Symphony No. 2
- 1962 – Honorary degree from Montclair State University
- 1964 – Honorary degree from University of the Arts
- 1966 – Prix Italia for Black Sounds
- 1966 – Guggenheim Fellowship
- 1972 – Naumburg Chamber Composition Award for String Quartet No. 3
- 1972–74 – National Endowment for the Arts Grants
- 1979 – Kennedy Center Friedhelm Award for String Quartet No. 4
- 1980 – Honorary degree from University of Michigan
- 1985 – Honorary degree from University of Pennsylvania
- 1985 – Gold Medal at Brandeis Creative Arts Awards
- 1986 – Lancaster Symphony Composers Award
- 1987 – University of Bridgeport's Andre and Clara Mertens Contemporary Composer Award
- 1987 – Alfred I. duPont Composer's Award
- 1991 – Bellagio artist in residence
- 1994 – Honorary degree from Miami University
- 1997 – Longy School of Music Distinguished Achievement Award
- 1998 – Grammy Award (nominated) "String Quartet No. 3"
- 1999 – ASCAP Lifetime Achievement Award
- 2004 – Grammy Award (nominated) "String Quartet No. 5"
- 2006 – Deems Taylor Award for The Aesthetics of Survival: A Composer's View of Twentieth-Century Music
