= Symphony No. 5 (Rochberg) =

The Symphony No. 5 is the fifth symphony by the American composer George Rochberg. It was commissioned by the Chicago Symphony Orchestra, which first performed the piece under the direction of Georg Solti on March 13, 1986. The symphony has a duration of approximately 28 minutes and is cast a single continuous movement. It was a finalist for the 1986 Pulitzer Prize for Music.

== Reception ==
The symphony has been largely praised by music critics. Reviewing a recording of the piece, Andrew Farach-Colton of Gramophone called it "a gripping, emotionally expansive work—cast in a single movement of almost half an hour's duration—whose gestures are defiantly traditional." He added, "Rochberg alludes here to Mahler, Wagner and Shostakovich, among others, though he somehow manages to create a unified, utterly individual style." Anthony Burton of BBC Music Magazine was more critical, writing, "The Fifth Symphony, unheard since its premiere by the Chicago Symphony and Solti in 1986, is in a single large movement, alternating between anguished near-atonality and much more consonant slow episodes, largely in the accents of Mahler; as it progresses it settles increasingly into the slower music, a shift which feels suspiciously like a capitulation to easy listening rather than a genuine resolution of conflict."
