= Douglas Townsend =

American classical composer (1921–2012)

Douglas Townsend (November 8, 1921 – August 1, 2012) was an American classical composer and musicologist. Born in Manhattan, Townsend became interested in composition while a student at the Fiorello H. LaGuardia High School of Music & Art and Performing Arts, in New York City. He taught himself composition, counterpoint and orchestration. In 1941, he began studying composition privately, with Tibor Serly, Stefan Wolpe, Aaron Copland, Otto Luening and Felix Greissle, among others.

Townsend taught at Brooklyn College, CUNY (1958–69), Lehman College, CUNY (1970–71), the University of Bridgeport (Connecticut; 1973–5) and Purchase College (also known as SUNY Purchase) (1973–6). From 1977 to 1980, he was editor of Musical Heritage Review. Townsend’s research into 18th- and 19th-century music has resulted in editions, recordings and performances, most notably of a Carl Czerny overture and a mass by Sigismund Neukomm. He received research grants from the Martha Baird Rockefeller Fund (1965) and the New York State Council on the Arts (1975).

Townsend’s compositions include several orchestral works, chamber music pieces, choral works, film and television scores, three operettas, and one opera. While still a high school student, he won a nationwide contest for student composers; Bernard Herrmann led the CBS Symphony Orchestra in a radio broadcast performance of the winning composition, Contra Dances. Seven years later, Townsend achieved public notice as a composer when pianist Ray Lev performed the premiere of his Sonatina No. 1 at Carnegie Hall. Townsend's own compositions generally used traditional forms and tonality.

Townsend was married twice. His first marriage was to Anne-Marie Findley, and produced three children. His second wife, Jean, survived him.
