= Hedwig Bilgram =

German musician and educator

- Born: 31 March 1933 (age 92); Memmingen, Bavaria
- Occupation(s): Musician, educator
- Awards: First prize (organ) ARD International Music Competition (1959)

Hedwig Bilgram (born 31 March 1933) is a German musician and educator.

She was born in Memmingen. She studied piano from an early age and went on to study organ with Karl Richter and piano with Friedrich Wührer. In 1959, she won first prize at the ARD International Music Competition. In 1961, she began teaching at the University of Music and Performing Arts Munich in Munich and became a professor in 1964.

For many years, she performed with the Münchener Bach-Chor and Münchener Bach-Orchester under Karl Richter. Bilgram has performed as a soloist and with musicians such as Paul Meisen, Maurice André and Jean-Pierre Rampal in Europe, North America, Japan and Russia. She has been a member of the Berlin Haydn Ensemble since 1990. She has premiered works by Harald Genzmer, Henri Tomasi and André Jolivet.
