= List of postmodernist composers =

Lists of composers by philosophical stance: Postmodernist composers

== Canada ==
- John Oswald (born 1953)

== Estonia ==
- Arvo Pärt (born 1935)

== Finland ==
- Kaija Saariaho (1952–2023)

== France ==
- Pierre Boulez (1925–2016)
- René Leibowitz (1913–1972)
- Olivier Messiaen (1908–1992)

== Germany ==
- Hans-Jürgen von Bose (born 1953)
- Hans-Christian von Dadelsen (born 1948)
- Heiner Goebbels (born 1952)
- Wilhelm Killmayer (1927–2017)
- Detlev Müller-Siemens (born 1957)
- Wolfgang Rihm (1952–2024)

== Greece ==
- Iannis Xenakis (1922–2001)

== Hungary ==
- György Ligeti (1923–2006)

== Italy ==
- Luciano Berio (1925–2003)
- Aldo Clementi (1925–2011)
- Luigi Nono (1924–1990)

== Norway ==
- Marcus Paus (born 1979)

== Poland ==
- Henryk Górecki (1933–2010)
- Zygmunt Krauze (born 1938)

== United Kingdom ==
- Thomas Adès (born 1971)
- Harrison Birtwistle (1934–2022)
- Cornelius Cardew (1936–1981)
- Brian Eno (born 1948)
- Brian Ferneyhough (born 1943)
- John Tavener (1944–2013)

== United States ==
- John Adams (born 1947)
- Robert Ashley (1930–2014)
- William Bolcom (born 1938)
- Henry Brant (1913–2008)
- Earle Brown (1926–2002)
- John Cage (1912–1992)
- John Corigliano (born 1938)
- Michael Daugherty (born 1954)
- Morton Feldman (1926–1987)
- Philip Glass (born 1937)
- Steve Reich (born 1936)
- John Zorn (born 1953)

== See also ==
- Modernism
- Postmodernism
