= Piano Sonata in C major, D 840 (Schubert) =

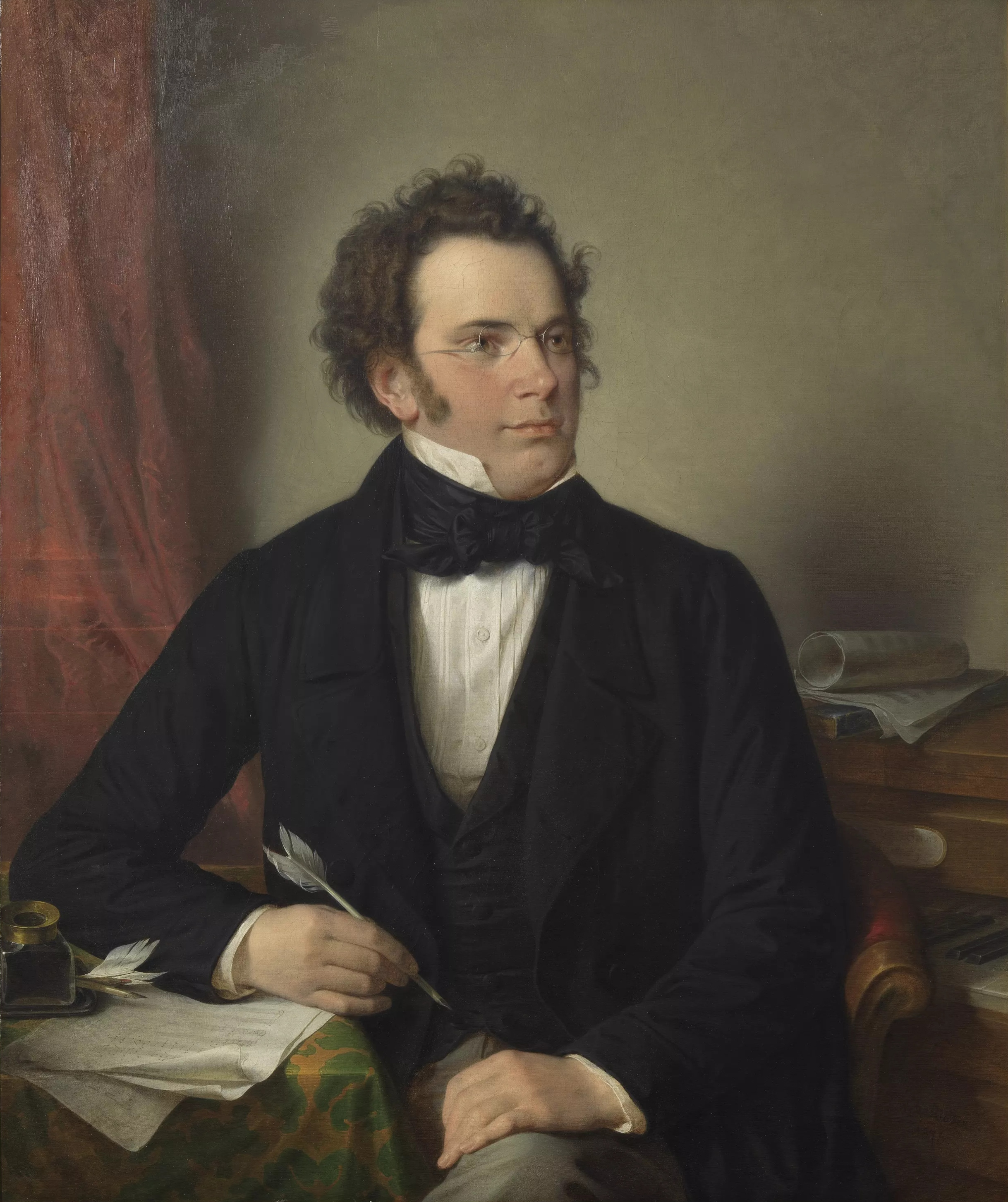
1875 portrait of Franz Schubert, after an 1825 original

Franz Schubert's Piano Sonata in C major, D. 840, nicknamed "Reliquie" upon its first publication in 1861 in the mistaken belief that it had been Schubert's last work, was written in April 1825, whilst the composer was also working on the A minor sonata, D. 845 in tandem.

Schubert abandoned the C major piano sonata, and only the first two movements were fully completed, with the trio section of the third movement also written in full. The minuet section of the third movement is incomplete and contains unusual harmonic changes, which suggests it was there Schubert had become disillusioned and abandoned the movement and later the sonata. The final fourth movement is also incomplete, ending abruptly after 272 measures. Even in this truncated form, the sonata takes approximately 30 to 35 minutes to perform.

The fragments of the sonata survived in Schubert's manuscripts, and later the work was collected and published in its incomplete form in 1861.

== Movements ==
There are four movements:

1. Moderato (C major, 4/4 time, sonata form)
  Duration: approximately 15 to 18 minutes
2. Andante (C minor, 6/8 time, five-part rondo form)
  Duration: approximately 10 minutes
3. Menuetto: Allegretto – Trio (A♭ major, 3/4 time, incomplete ternary form)
  Fragment that ends at measure 80 after the main theme returns in the B part of the menuetto
4. Rondo: Allegro (C major)
  Fragment that ends 32 measures after the development starts

In the third movement, the opening theme is immediately repeated, slightly embellished, in A major, and the reprise also begins in this key. Presumably the minuet would have then returned to A♭ major. The trio is in the parallel minor, notated enharmonically as G♯ minor.

== Structure ==
Ernst Krenek outlined the structure of each of the work's four movements in notes that he contributed to a recording by Ray Lev in 1947. Krenek elaborates on how he composed a completion, included in the recording, for the unfinished movements. According to Krenek:

- The first movement introduces "the energetically pulsating rhythm which runs nearly through the entire piece". Unusually, the second theme is initially in B minor, not the expected dominant of G major, which appears only toward the end of the exposition. The development likewise stresses B minor until a false recapitulation in another unexpected key, B major; the actual recapitulation follows closely in F major, and C major finally makes its return with a forte restatement of the first theme. "The second theme now appears in A minor, and the coda turns to A♭, a key that was touched upon early in the beginning of the movement, so that the key scheme of the whole is rounded out with admirable logic."
- The second movement is in five-part rondo form, "curiously animated by relentless drive". Its first theme, in C minor, incorporates downward skips in sevenths; running sixteenth notes and dramatic accents characterize its second, in A♭ major. The running sixteenths continue as the first theme returns, succeeded by a repeat of the second theme in C major and a final, quiet statement of the first theme to complete the movement.
- The fragmentary third movement rapidly modulates from A♭ to A major shortly after its beginning, "a very unusual move", at which point Schubert ceased composition. Krenek speculates that Schubert may have intended to complete the movement "with a recapitulation symmetrically returning from A to A♭ major shortly before the end". In his completion, Krenek "wrote a brief development section, re-introduced the theme in A and returned to A♭, adding a few measures of transition to A♭ minor, which is enharmonically the key of the trio, an exceptionally charming lyrical item".
- For the fragmentary fourth movement, Schubert completed the first and second themes of the exposition and introduced a third theme in A minor, derived from the first, to open the development before leaving off work on this movement in rondo-sonata form. Krenek indicates his completion elaborated the idea of the third theme and "followed it up with a swiftly modulating development of the first theme and a normal recapitulation" of slightly shorter length than the exposition. His coda takes the third theme as its basis and refers back to the first theme of the first movement, "an idea to which I felt entitled since Schubert had hinted at it at the end of the finale of the Sonata in A major".

== Completions ==
Given its large scope and the extent of material that Schubert left for the incomplete movements, this sonata has inspired various composers and performers to undertake completions. Some of their efforts, particularly those penned by performers, have appeared on records. Among them are the following:

- Ludwig Stark published a completion in 1877.
- Armin Knab wrote a completion of the sonata in 1920, which was published by Edition Peters, edited by Heinz Wegener, in 1962. In 1920 Knab published an essay entitled "Schuberts unvollendete Klaviersonate in C-dur und ihre Ergänzung", which appeared in the Deutsche Musik-Zeitung.
- Ernst Krenek wrote his completion, mentioned above, at the request of his friend, the pianist and composer Eduard Erdmann, who wished to add the sonata to his repertoire. Krenek himself dated that request to 1922. Other sources date his completion to 1921. Krenek's completion was published by Universal Edition in 1923. It was recorded at least three times. The first recording was in the aforementioned performance by Ray Lev on a set of 78 RPM disks issued by the American Concert Hall Society label; the second was performed by Friedrich Wührer on a monaural LP issued by American Vox Records (later reissued on CD by Bearac). A later recording is by Stanislav Khristenko on Toccata Classics TOCC 0298 (CD marked as first volume of Krenek's piano works). The most recent recording (2024) is by Can Çakmur on BIS Records BIS-2690 (the third instalment of his Schubert+ series), pairing it with Krenek’s 2nd piano sonata.
- Walter Rehberg wrote a completion in 1927, published by Edition Steingräber in 1930.
- Nikolai Zhilyayev wrote a completion in 1932 (москва: государственное музыкалное издательство 4.IV.1932, VN 12596).
- Harold Truscott published a completion of the Minuet (3rd movement) in 1957.
- Paul Badura-Skoda published a completion in 1976. He updated and recorded his completion in 1997.
- Bart Berman wrote a completion in 1978; the Dutch Erasmus label released his recording of it in 1997.
- Ian Munro wrote a completion in 1994 and recorded it for the Australian Tall Poppies label.
- Martino Tirimo wrote a completion and included it in his complete set of the sonatas on EMI.
- Anthony Goldstone wrote and recorded a completion in 2003.
- Brian Newbould wrote a completion recorded by Todd Crow, its dedicatee, for release on compact disc by the Toccata Classics label.

Piano sonatas (2 hands) by Franz Schubert
| Preceded by Sonata in A minor (D. 784) | 21 Sonatas numbering system No. 15 | Succeeded by Sonata in A minor (D. 845) |
| Preceded by Sonata in A minor (D. 784) | 23 Sonatas numbering system No. 17 | Succeeded by Sonata in A minor (D. 845) |
