= Norman Fisher (public servant) =

Australian public servant

Norman Fisher AM
- Born: 5 September 1936; Melbourne, Australia
- Died: 19 February 1997 (aged 60); Melbourne, Australia
- Occupation: Public servant
- Spouse: Maureen

Norman William Frederick Fisher AM (5 September 1936 – 19 February 1997) was a senior Australian public servant in Canberra.

Fisher held many positions in the Australian Public Service, including Foundation Director, Bureau of Labour Market Research (1980); Director, Department of Employment and Industrial Relations (1982); Deputy Commissioner, Public Service Board (1986); Director, ACT Institute of Technical and Further Education 1988–1993; and again from 1993 until his retirement in 1997. He was founding Director of the Australian International Hotel School.

== Awards and honours ==
Fisher was appointed a Member of the Order of Australia on 9 June 1986 "in recognition of service in the fields of labour market research and public administration".

In 2001, a street in the Canberra suburb of Bruce was named Norman Fisher Circuit in Fisher's honour.
