= Concord String Quartet =

American string quartet

The Concord String Quartet was an American string quartet established in 1971. The members of the quartet were Mark Sokol and Andrew "Andy" Jennings, violins; John Kochánowski, viola; Norman Fischer, cello. They gave their last regular concert on May 15, 1987. An anniversary concert was given in December 1996 at the Naumburg Foundation.

== Farewell Concert Program Notes (partial) May 7, 1987 ==
The Concord String Quartet was born in 1971 when its members agreed over the telephone to try forming an ensemble. They came from four different parts of the country: Mark from Oberlin, Ohio and Seattle, Washington; Andy from Buffalo, New York; John from South Bend, Indiana, and Norman from Plymouth, Michigan. Each member been playing the quartet repertoire for many years. However, each had studied or played with the Juilliard Quartet's founding violinist Robert Mann, who encouraged their aspirations and recommended them to each other.

They enrolled in a summer program for nascent string quartets at SUNY at Binghamton Young Artists Program which was created by Peter Marsh and the Lenox String Quartet. This is where they met for the first time and began rehearsing with an awkward discord. Apparently, one of them had been practicing the wrong music.

Even as they were selecting the name Concord out of the dictionary (with its resonant associations – Ives' "Concord, Mass." sonata; the opposite of discord), the foursome launched itself into its contemporary repertoire with a vengeance. This was fueled by a commitment to record a three-record VOX BOX of avant-garde American quartets. Their intensive summer in Binghamton was broken only by their introduction to Dartmouth College in August – a two-week rehearsing residency funded by the Friends of Hopkins Center which culminated with an informal "thank you" performance in Rollins Chapel.

The next two years saw the Concord taking part in the Young Artists Program at SUNY at Binghamton and in a touring residency sponsored by the Hudson Valley Philharmonic Society. Throughout that period the quartet consolidated its reputation as champions of contemporary American music, while exploring both the well-trodden paths and the odd byways of the standard quartet repertoire. Their award-winning albums of contemporary quartets established the Concords at the forefront of contemporary quartet performance, and unloosed a steady stream of new quartets by hopeful composers that arrived in their mailbox several times a week for years. For much of that time, their policy was to give every new work at least a quick run-through, and their commitment to new works never lapsed. Numerous quartets have been written for or dedicated to the Concords.

Early on, as winners of the Walter W. Naumburg Chamber Music Award in the fall of 1972, they were entitled to commission a new quartet. They chose to approach composer George Rochberg, who produced his String Quartet No. 3. One of the earliest works written in the then revolutionary "collage" technique that has since been dubbed "Neo-Romantic," the String Quartet no.3 (Rochberg) and the Concord's performances and recording of it, landed them smack in the middle of an international musical controversy that continued through their seven-year professional association.

In 1974, following several more concerts at Dartmouth, then director of the Hopkins Center Peter Smith asked them to become string quartet-in-residence. The quartet has played over eleven hundred concerts in forty-one states and the District of Columbia, three Canadian provinces, and six other foreign countries.

They celebrated the end of their first three-year residency at Dartmouth College with a performance of the complete Beethoven quartets – considered the pivotal challenge for any string quartet, and later took that cycle around the country, including a Beethoven series in New York's Alice Tully Hall in three successive seasons. They have also performed a complete Bartok cycle, and participated in a summer devoted largely to the chamber music of Franz Schubert.

Never far from public sight, they made news in 1976 when they rehearsed with composer Lukas Foss in the lounge of the Pan American terminal at Kennedy International Airport – the only place where the busy quartet and composer could cross paths during hectic touring schedules. They were again in the headlines in 1982 when Jennings' Stradivarius violin was stolen after a concert on Nantucket Island – and it was recovered on the mainland several days later.

In 1977 the quartet won the first of two Emmy Awards (for the New England Region) for its three-part PBS broadcast "The Concord String Quartet Plays Bartok and Haydn."

At Dartmouth College, each has held a position of Adjunct Associate Professor of Music. As individuals, they have performed at Dartmouth and throughout the region with great frequency. Members of the quartet have soloed with the Dartmouth Symphony Orchestra in major concerti, have appeared in solo recital, and have performed with other faculty and visiting artists in a variety of chamber music contexts.

In addition to their Beethoven, Bartok, and Schubert celebrations, other significant Dartmouth performances have included a concert of new works by faculty members Jon Appleton, Lauren Levey, and Christian Wolff, a performance with their "musical godfather" Robert Mann, of some of his own music; a continuing series devoted to Mozart quartets and quintets, and concerts with celebrated guest artists including Gervase de Peyer, Richard Goode, Claude Monteux, Gilbert Kalish, Leslie Guinn, Menahem Pressler, Bernard Greenhouse, and Walter Trampler.

The quartet announced that it would disband following the 1986–87 concert season, so that its members could pursue other teaching and performing activities. They left the stage as one of the few world-class quartets that had maintained its original membership throughout its lifetime.

== Discography ==
- American String Quartets 1950–1970

Works:

Stefan Wolpe: String Quartet, C. 170
Earle Brown: String Quartet
John Cage: String Quartet in Four Parts
Leon Kirchner: String Quartet No. 3 for strings & tape
Christian Wolff: Summer for string quartet
George Crumb: Black Angels (Images I), for electric string quartet
Lejaren Hiller: String quartet No.5 (In Quarter-Tones)
Jacob Druckman: String Quartet No. 2
Morton Feldman: Structures, for string quartet

Label and catalog number: VOXBOX CDX 5143 (ADD; two discs: 74:11, 74:33; issued 1995).
Recording date: 1972.
Release date: 1973, 1995.
Critical reaction: Selected by Fanfare Magazine as a "Hall of Fame" recording.
This album was originally issued by Vox in 1972 as a 3-LP boxed set entitled "The Avant Garde String Quartet in the USA" VOX SVBX-5306 (Recorded October 18–20, 1971; February 14–16 and June 12–14, 1972)

- George Rochberg: String Quartet No. 2

with Phyllis Bryn-Julson, soprano TURNABOUT TV-s 34524 (Recorded October 30–31, 1972)

- George Rochberg: String Quartet No. 3

NONESUCH H-71283 (Recorded November 20–22, 1972)
Nominated for a 1973 Grammy Award for Best Chamber Music Performance

- Tison Street: String Quartet (1972)

CRI S-305 (Recorded September 20, 1973)

- Charles Ives: String Quartets No. 1 & 2

NONESUCH H-71306 (Recorded June 3–5, 1974)
Nominated for a 1975 Grammy Award for Best Chamber Music Performance

- Lejaren Hiller: Quartet No. 6, Betsy Jolas: Quartet III

CRI S-332 (Recorded June 19, 1973; October 15, 1974)

- George Rochberg: Quartet No. 1; Duo Concertante (Sokol/Fischer); Ricordanza (Fischer/Rochberg)

CRI S-337 (Recorded March 10–12, 1975)

- Leslie Bassett: Sextet"

with Gilbert Kalish and John Graham CRI S-323 (Recorded May 18, 1975)

- Tison Street: Viola Quintet

with Marcus Thompson, viola CRI S-381 (Recorded May 16, 1976)

- Elsworth Milburn: String Quartet (1974)

CRI S-369 (Recorded May, 1976)

- Franz Joseph Haydn: Quartet in d minor, Opus 76 No. 2 "Quinten", Quartet in C major, Opus 76 No. 3, "Emperor"

TURNABOUT TVC 37003 (Recorded January 16–18, 24–25,1978)

- Alexander Borodin: Quartet No. 2 in D major, Antonín Dvořák: Quartet No. 12 in F major, Opus 96, "American"

TURNABOUT TVC 37009 (Recorded January 24–26, 1978)

- George Rochberg: Piano Quintet

with Alan Marks, piano NONESUCH 78011 (Recorded September 28–30, 1980)

- George Rochberg: Quartets Nos. 4, 5, 6 "Concord"

[Variations on Pachelbel Canon from Quartet No. 6 also issued on RCA MRL1 8523]
NONESUCH 78017 (Recorded November 5–9, 1979)

- George Rochberg: Quartet No. 7 with Leslie Guinn, baritone, Samuel Barber: Quartet, Opus 11, "Dover Beach" with Leslie Guinn

RCA RED SEAL ARL2-4198 (Recorded April, 1981)

- Ludwig van Beethoven: Quartet in a minor, Opus 132

VOX CUM LAUDE D-VCL 9080 (Recorded December 1983, April 1984)

== Awards ==
- 1972 Walter Naumberg Chamber Music Award

(resulted in the commissioning of the Rochberg Quartet No. 3, later nominated for a Pulitzer Prize)

- 1973 Record World Classical Awards: "The Best Contemporary Work Recorded" (Rochberg No. 3)
- 1973 Stereo Magazine: "Best of the Year" (Rochberg No. 3)
- 1973 Grammy Nomination: "Best Chamber Music Work of the Year (Rochberg No. 3)
- 1973 Saturday Review: "Best of the Year" (Rochberg No. 3)
- 1974 Seventh Annual High Fidelity-Montreux International Competition Nomination
- 1975 San Francisco Chronicle: "Best Record of the Year" (Ives Quartets 1 & 2)
- 1975 Grammy Nomination: "Best Chamber Music Performance" (Ives Quartets 1 & 2)
- 1977 New England Regional Emmy Award: "Outstanding Entertainment"

("The Concord String Quartet Plays Bartok and Haydn" on WENH-TV)

- 1978 Stereo Review: "Best Recordings of the Last 20 Years"

(Two Concord String Quartet albums named among eight recordings in the Chamber Music category)

== Premiers (World and American) ==
- Hugh Aitken "Opus 95 Revisited"
- Jon Appleton "String Quartet"
- William Bolcom "String Quartet No. 9"
- Joel Chadabe "Soft Edges"
- Avram David "String Quartet"
- David Diamond "Piano Quintet"
- James Drew "Lux Incognita"
- Jacob Druckman "String Quartet No. 3"
- Brian Fennelly "String Quartet"
- Lukas Foss "Divertissement pour Micah", "Quartet Plus (orchestra)", "String Quartet No. 3"
- Fanny Mendelssohn Hensel "String Quartet"
- Hans Werner Henze "String Quartets Nos. 3, 4, 5"
- George Heussenstaum "String Quartet"
- Lejaren Hiller "String Quartet Nos. 2, 4, 6"
- Ben Johnston "Crossings"
- Betsy Jolas "String Quartet No. 3 (Nine Etudes)"
- Gregory Kosteck "String Quartet No. 4"
- Ezra Laderman "Octet", "String Quartet No. 5"
- Lauren Levey "String Quartet (Homage)"
- David Lewin "String Quartet"
- Robert Hall Lewis "String Quartet No. 3"
- Steven Mackey "Fumeux Fume"
- Gustav Mahler "Piano Quartet"
- Ellsworth Milburn "String Quartet"
- David Noon "String Quartet"
- Krzysztof Penderecki "String Quartet No. 2"
- James Riley "String Quartet"
- George Rochberg "Cello Quintet", "Piano Quintet", "String Quartets Nos. 3, 4, 5, 6, 7"
- Mark Rosenberg "String Quartet"
- Eric Salzman "Improvisation"
- Julie Schwartz "In Return"
- Sinya Shen "Four Character Pieces"
- Noam Sheriff "String Quartet"
- David Stock "String Quartet"
- Francis Thorne "String Quartet No. 3"
- Stanley Walden "Fandango"
- Anton Webern "Scherzo-Trio", "String Quartet" (1907), "Trio" (pre-Opus)
- Christian Wolff "String Quartet Exercises (Workers and Peasants... etc.)"
- Elie Yardin "Rivercar"
- Michael Young "String Quartet"
