= Norman Fischer (cellist) =

American cellist

- Born: May 25, 1949 (age 76); Washington D. C., U.S.
- Genres: Classical
- Occupations: Cellist, cello teacher
- Instrument: Cello
- Member of: Fischer Duo
- Formerly of: Concord String Quartet
- Spouse: Jeanne Kierman
- Website: www.fischerduo.com

Norman Charles Fischer (born May 25, 1949) is an American cellist. Fischer is the Herbert S. Autrey Professor of Cello and director of chamber music at the Shepherd School of Music at Rice University.

== Biography ==
=== Early career ===
A student of Richard Kapuscinski, Claus Adam and Bernard Greenhouse, Fischer is a graduate of the Oberlin Conservatory of Music. His professional solo debut was in 1983 in Symphony Space of Johann Sebastian Bach's complete cello suites which The New York Times called "inspiring."

=== Chamber music ===
Fischer was a founding member of the Concord String Quartet which was created in a summer quartet program at Binghamton University in 1971. As a member of the quartet, he won a Naumburg Chamber Music Award, an Emmy Award, and two Grammy Award nominations. The quartet existed for 16 years and had its final concert in 1987. Since then, Fischer has appeared with his wife, pianist Jeanne Kierman, as "Fischer Duo" which was selected as an Artistic Ambassador by the United States Information Agency.

=== Teaching ===
Fischer accepted his position as a professor at the Shepherd School of Music at Rice University in 1992, having previously taught at the Oberlin Conservatory of Music and Dartmouth College. He has also been on the faculty of the Tanglewood Music Center since 1985.
