= Daniel Albright =

American literary critic and academic

- Born: October 29, 1945; Chicago, Illinois, US
- Died: January 3, 2015 (aged 69); Cambridge, Massachusetts, US
- Occupations: Literary critic, musicologist, poet, professor

Academic background
- Education: Rice University (B.A.); Yale University (PhD)
- Influences: Richard Ellmann (early career)

Daniel Albright (October 29, 1945 – January 3, 2015) was the Ernest Bernbaum Professor of Literature at Harvard and the editor of Modernism and Music: An Anthology of Sources. He was born and grew up in Chicago, Illinois and completed his undergraduate studies on a full scholarship at Rice in 1967. He received his MPhil in 1969 and PhD in 1970, both from Yale. Albright is also the author of the book Quantum Poetics which was published by Cambridge University Press in 1997. He held an NEH fellowship from 1973 to 1974, was a Guggenheim Fellow from 1976 to 1977, and more recently, he was a 2012 Berlin Prize Fellow at the American Academy in Berlin.

Albright began his undergraduate career as a mathematics major, but changed to English literature. Although trained at Yale as a literary critic, after the publication of his book Representation and the Imagination: Beckett, Kafka, Nabokov, and Schoenberg, he was invited by the University of Rochester to come teach there as a kind of liaison between the department of English and the Eastman School of Music. At Rochester, he studied musicology, which forever changed his career. Much of his subsequent work has been on literature and music, culminating with his 2014 book, Panaesthetics which addresses many arts and examines to what extent the arts are many or are one. Putting Modernism Together was released posthumously, by Johns Hopkins University Press, and Music's Monism in fall 2021 from the University of Chicago Press. He was hired in 2003 in the Harvard departments of English, but later joined the Comparative Literature department and soon began offering courses in the Music department as well.

== Career ==
While Albright's interests and writing subjects were wide-ranging, he received acclaim in three principal areas: as a scholarly commenter on poetry, in particular the poems of W. B. Yeats; as a musicologist; and as a theorist of multidisciplinary interpretation he termed "panaesthetics." The sections below discuss these career phases in more detail.

=== Yeats Scholar ===
Albright's advisor at Yale was Richard Ellmann, author of Yeats, The Man and the Masks (1948), a pivotal Yeats biography, and The Identity of Yeats (1953), a book-length analysis of the poet's style and themes. Albright wrote of Ellman: "A conversation about a poem of Yeats' with Richard Ellmann was like a stroll through a forest with an agreeable companion who not only knows the names of every bird, bush, lichen, and bug, but also hears sounds usually audible only to bats." Albright's scholarship continues Ellmann's biographical reading of Yeats, a complex endeavor, since Yeats reflected on his life indirectly in his poems, mainly through symbols and personae. Only gradually did Yeats allow a real person, with real problems and anxieties, to emerge.

In The Identity of Yeats, Ellman notes that beginning in the 1910s, Yeats' poems became "openly autobiographical, the creation of a man capable of living in the world as well as of contemplating perfection. To make it so, he would have to lead his life in such a way that it was capable of being converted into a symbol. Moreover, he could depict the speaker of his poems in a wider variety of situations, intellectual as well as emotional." Rather than speaking through fictional characters such as Michael Robartes and Owen Aherne, Yeats made himself a primary actor, with a somewhat rigid code of self-imposed rules designed to prevent "poetry where momentary emotions would over-bubble."

Albright's criticism reads Yeats against Yeats, not to reduce the poems to biographical explanations but to understand them as symbolic manifestations of the poet (both real and idealized) at different stages of his career. Albright's first book, The Myth against Myth: A Study of Yeats's Imagination in Old Age, for example, discusses how Yeats' later "realist" poems such as "News for the Delphic Oracle" and "The Circus Animals' Desertion" re-interpret themes and images of earlier, more self-consciously mythic works such as "The Wanderings of Oisin."

Disagreeing with some of the book's readings, Frank Kinahan's review in Modern Philology concludes with strong praise: "Albright is a close and sensitive reader of poetry, and there are exegeses here leaving you nodding Yes till your neck aches." Kinahan concludes: "The years to come will show us that Yeats in his twenties and thirties was always on the verge of becoming the realist that an older Yeats became. And it is work like Albright's that is helping to bring that realization about."

In 1985, Albright published a review in The New York Review of Books of the Richard Finneran-edited Collected Poems of W. B. Yeats, a comprehensive 1983 volume based on the Macmillan Publishers edition. Echoing criticisms of Yeats scholar Norman Jeffares, Albright took Finneran to task for preserving Macmillan's ordering of the poems, in particular placing that long but seminal early poem "The Wanderings of Oisin" at the end of the book. This was originally done by Macmillan in the 1930s for commercial reasons: the publisher felt that prospective buyers, browsing in bookstores, might be put off by a long poem at the beginning. Albright made the case for a pure chronological ordering of the poems, especially since "Oisin"'s themes reverberate throughout the later work. Albright also criticized Finneran's reluctance to use biographical interpretations in his scholarly glosses:

[T]he chief curiosity of the commentary of the new edition is its omission of biography. I doubt that any annotator on earth besides Professor Finneran would consider it irrelevant that "Upon a Dying Lady" (1912–1914), a poem rich in circumstantial detail, is about a real woman, Mabel Beardsley, the sister of the artist Aubrey; but her name is omitted from the gloss, which instead talks about Petronius Arbiter and a warrior mentioned in the Rubáiyát. World history, literature, orthography are real to Professor Finneran; individual lives are not.

From this background eventually emerged Albright's own definitive Yeats edition, The Poems, published in 1990 in the Everyman's Library series. The book restores the chronological ordering of the verse, and contains several hundred pages of critical analysis, including biographical references lacking in the Finneran edition. As noted on Albright's website, The Poems was "edited with a view to presenting a close approximation to the 'sacred book' Yeats hoped to bequeath to the world" —that is, more like the essential volume under discussion during Yeats' lifetime, before those marketing considerations intervened during the Depression and became codified in subsequent editions. Harvard professor Philip Fisher described The Poems as "[one] part Yeats, [one] part line-by-line commentary with wonderful mini-essays by Dan Albright on every topic in Yeats." Fisher laments that the book disappeared from the shelves but that is only true for the paperback edition: J. M. Dent currently publishes it in hardback in the United Kingdom.

=== Musicologist ===
Albright was a literature professor at the University of Virginia when he published his third book, Representation and the Imagination: Beckett, Kafka, Nabokov and Schoenberg (1980). The Schoenberg chapter prompted an invitation to teach at the University of Rochester, with Albright acting as a kind of liaison between the department of English and the Eastman School of Music. At Rochester, Albright published Untwisting the Serpent: Modernism in Music, Literature, and Other Arts (2000), recently described by Adam Parkes as "an astoundingly original rewriting of Gotthold Ephraim Lessing's Laocoön (1766) in Modernist terms":

Lessing famously divided spatial from temporal arts. Albright, however, conjectured that the division of the arts might be restated "not as a tension between the temporal arts and the spatial, but as a tension between arts that try to retain the propriety, the apartness, of their private media, and arts that try to lose themselves in some panaesthetic whole." To illustrate the latter, Albright examined the "aesthetic hybrids and chimeras" that resulted from artistic collaborations involving significant musical experiments in different media. While he recognized the value of attempts by various artists and critics to separate the arts, Albright's preference for the panaesthetic was clear...

Untwisting relied on analysis of specific historical collaborations among artists (Cocteau, Picasso, and Satie in Parade; Gertrude Stein and Virgil Thompson in Four Saints in Three Acts; Antheil, Léger, and Murphy in Ballet Mécanique, and many others) to show how the respective media in those pieces clicked or clashed. Discussing these components required stepping outside the usual province of the literary critic; that is, Albright needed to be just as adept and informed in making judgments about music and art as he was in evaluating writing. As it turned out, his talent for close reading of poems extended to scores and timbres, sufficiently to impress music's critical community, despite a few complaints about his assumptions and definitions.

"What the author refers to variously as fixed figures, fixed elements, ostinati, and pattern units -- all musical motives that repeat -- leap to the foreground of almost every analysis in this book," Ruth Longobardi wrote in Current Musicology, "and yet Albright never explicitly explains how to tell the difference between repeating motives that are dissonant and those that are consonant, or between those that are mimetic and those that are abstract." Nevertheless, she writes, "his inquiry into different types of artistic collaboration is extremely valuable to musicology, since what it offers that field, frequently insulated from other disciplines, is a new path by which to enter an interdisciplinary consideration of Modernist music dramas."

In Kurt Weill Newsletter, David Drew wrote: "Albright well understands that 'paying attention to the text' is a discipline whose exactions are multiplied in proportion to the complexity of the interdisciplinary context. And yet: 'this book tries to please by holding up to the light the fugitive but powerful creatures born from particular unions of music and the other arts.' It does please; or when it doesn't, it stirs things up, which is just as good."

Several reviewers were intrigued by Albright's discussion of surrealism in music, and his identification of Francis Poulenc as a key figure. "Before the recent publication of ... Untwisting the Serpent," writes Jonathan Kramer in his book Postmodern Music, Postmodern Listening (2016), "there was little serious discussion of surrealism in music (although informally calling certain music surreal is certainly common enough). Music has been assumed not to have gone through much of a surrealist stage." Kramer admires Albright's cross-disciplinary consideration of surrealism in musical theater, but believes Untwisting is "most useful....is in [its] discussions of Poulenc’s specifically musical surrealism." He quotes these words of Albright's from Untwisting:

I understand Poulenc’s manner of quotation -- and he was a music thief of amazing flagrancy -- not as a technique for making pointed semantic allusions, but as a technique for disabling the normal semantic procedures of music. … Poulenc is a composer of surrealizing misquotations.

Oliver Charles Edward Smith's essay on Poulenc in Cogent quotes liberally from Untwisting as a "comprehensive study of surrealism in music" (while noting that Theodor W. Adorno was the first to apply the "ism" musically). Both Smith and Kramer favorably cite Albright's explanation of the apparent (incongruous) conservatism of surrealism in music, compared to its wilder embodiments in the other arts, noting these passages from Untwisting [Kramer's ellipses]:

Surrealism is a phenomenon of semantic dislocation and fissure. It is impossible to disorient unless some principle of orientation has been established in the first place. … In other words, you can’t provide music that means wrong unless you provide music that means something. … The surrealism of Poulenc and his fellows didn’t try to create a new language of music -- it simply tilted the semantic planes of the old language of music. Just as surrealist paintings often have a horizon line and a highly developed sense of perspective, in order that the falseness of the space and the errors of scale among the painted entities can register their various outrages to normal decorum, so surrealist music provides an intelligible context of familiar sounds in order to develop a system of meanings that can assault or discredit other systems of meanings.

=== Multi-Disciplinarian ===
Untwisting the Serpent limited its cross-disciplinary analysis to specific examples where musicians, artists, and writers collaborated. In Albright's 2014 book Panaesthetics: On the Unity and Diversity of the Arts, he "developed a more expansive and philosophical version of his arguments by ranging across the entire history of the arts," according to Adam Parkes. In his last book, Putting Modernism Together (2016), Albright renewed his pursuit of specifically Modernist forms of aesthetic hybridity. But whereas Untwisting deliberately cut across what Albright called the "various isms that both organize and perplex the history of twentieth-century art," the final book "confront[ed] those isms head-on, and recalibrate[d] the earlier account accordingly."

== Positions held ==
- Assistant Professor, University of Virginia, 1970–75
- Associate Professor, University of Virginia, 1975–81
- Professor, University of Virginia, 1981–87
- Visiting professor, Universität München, 1986–87
- Professor, University of Rochester, 1987–2003
- Richard L. Turner Professor in the Humanities, University of Rochester, 1995–2003
- Affiliate, Department of Musicology, Eastman School of Music, 1998–2003
- Professor of English and American Literature and Languages, Harvard University, 2003–2015
- Ernest Bernbaum Professor of Literature, Harvard University 2004–2015
- Affiliate, Department of Music, Harvard University, 2005–2015

== Books ==
- Music's Monisms: Disarticulating Modernism. University of Chicago Press, 2021.
- Putting Modernism Together: Literature, Music, and Painting, 1872–1927. Johns Hopkins University Press, 2015.
- Panaesthetics: On the Unity and Diversity of the Arts. Yale University Press, 2014.
- Evasions Sylph Editions Cahiers, 2012.
- Music Speaks: On the Language of Opera, Dance, and Song. Eastman Studies in Music, 2009.
- Musicking Shakespeare Eastman Studies in Music, 2007.
- Modernism and Music: An Anthology of Sources. University of Chicago Press, 2004.
- Beckett and Aesthetics. Cambridge University Press, 2003.
- Berlioz's Semi-Operas: Roméo et Juliette and La damnation de Faust. University of Rochester Press, 2001.
- Untwisting the Serpent: Modernism in Music, Literature, and the Visual Arts. University of Chicago Press, 2000.
- Quantum Poetics: Yeats, Pound, Eliot, and the Science of Modernism. Cambridge University Press, 1997.
- Editor, W. B. Yeats: The Poems. J. M. Dent and Sons, 1990. Revised third printing, 1994.
- Editor and Translator (with Heinz Vienken), Amerikanische Lyrik: Texte und Deutungen. Peter Lang Verlag, 1989.
- Stravinsky: The Music-Box and the Nightingale. Gordon and Breach, 1989.
- Editor, Poetries of America: Essays in the Relation of Character to Style, by Irvin Ehrenpreis. University Press of Virginia, 1988.
- Tennyson: The Muses' Tug-of-War. University Press of Virginia, 1986.
- Lyricality in English Literature. University of Nebraska Press, 1985.
- Representation and the Imagination: Beckett, Kafka, Nabokov, and Schoenberg. University of Chicago Press, 1981.
- Personality and Impersonality: Lawrence, Woolf, Mann. University of Chicago Press, 1978.
- The Myth against Myth: A Study of Yeats's Imagination in Old Age. Oxford University Press, 1972.
