= Jonathan Kramer =

American classical composer

Jonathan D Kramer
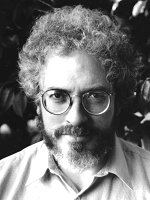
- Jonathan D Kramer
- Born: December 7, 1942
- Died: June 3, 2004 (aged 61)
- Era: Contemporary
- Works: Selected publications by Jonathan Kramer

Jonathan Donald Kramer (December 7, 1942, Hartford, Connecticut – June 3, 2004, New York City) was an American composer and music theorist.

== Biography ==
Kramer received his B.A. magna cum laude from Harvard University (1965) and his MA and PhD in music from the University of California, Berkeley (1967 and 1969). His composition teachers included Karlheinz Stockhausen, Roger Sessions, Leon Kirchner, Seymour Shifrin, Andrew Imbrie, Richard Felciano, Jean-Claude Éloy, Billy Jim Layton, Edwin Dugger, and Arnold Franchetti. He studied theory with David Lewin, criticism with Joseph Kerman, and computer music with John Chowning.

Kramer was professor of composition and theory at Columbia University from 1988 until his death in 2004. He also taught at the Oberlin Conservatory, Yale University, and the University of Cincinnati College-Conservatory of Music. He held visiting appointments at Wesleyan University, King's College London, the Canberra School of Music, the School of Music at the University of Western Australia, the Rockefeller Study Center in Bellagio (Italy), the Center for New Music and Technology (Berkeley), May in Miami, the ISCM Summer Workshop for Composers (Poland), and the European Mozart Academy (Poland). He served four years as program annotator of the San Francisco Symphony Orchestra, was annotator of the Cincinnati Symphony from 1980; a collection of his program notes, Listen to the Music, was published by Schirmer Books. He was the Cincinnati Symphony's composer in residence and new-music advisor from 1984 to 1992 and served as artist in residence of the Moebius Ensemble since 1997. His book "The Time of Music" is widely considered to be one of the preeminent works on the topic. He produced and hosted several local and national radio programs and represented American Public Radio three times at the International Rostrum of Composers in Paris.

His notable students include Robert Carl, R. Luke DuBois, Jason Eckardt, Paul Phillips (conductor), Dalit Warshaw, and Duncan Neilson.

Kramer was married to Norma Berson in August, 1966. They had two children, Zachary Charles, born April 1970, and Stephanie Lisa, born November 1972.

He married Deborah Bradley-Kramer on Jan 2, 2004, in Sugar Land, Texas. They had another ceremony on May 2, 2004, in Mohegan Lake, New York.

Active as a music theorist, Kramer published primarily on theories of musical time and postmodernism. At the time of his death he had just completed a book, "Postmodern Music, Postmodern Listening" and a cello composition for the American Holocaust Museum. The book was published by Bloomsbury Press in August 2016.

Two funds at Columbia University were named in honor of Kramer upon his death: The Jonathan D. Kramer Memorial Fund for Young Composers, and The Jonathan D. Kramer Legacy Fund.

== Selected publications (prose) ==
- The Time of Music (New York: Schirmer Books, 1988)
- Listen to the Music (New York: Schirmer Book, 1988); Spanish trans. Invitacion a la musica (Buenos Aires: Vergara, 1993)
- Postmodern Music, Postmodern Listening (Bloomsbury Press, 2016)
- ed. Time in Contemporary Musical Thought, special issue of Contemporary Music Review (1989–93)
- "The Nature and Origins of Musical Postmodernism," Current Musicology 66 (Spring 1999). Republished in Postmodern Music/Postmodern Thought, ed. Judy Lochhead and Joseph Auner (New York: Routledge, 2002)
- "Postmodern Concepts of Musical Time," Indiana Theory Review 17 (1997)
- "Durations from Nested Ratios and Summation Series: Toward an Approach to Rhythm Appropriate to Computer Composition," in Proceedings of the ACMA 1995 Conference (Melbourne: ACMA, 1995)
- "Beyond Unity: Toward an Understanding of Postmodernism in Music and Music Theory," in Concert Music, Rock, and Jazz since 1945: Essays and Analytical Studies (Rochester: U. of Rochester Press, 1995)
- "Unity and Disunity in Carl Nielsen's Sixth Symphony," in A Nielsen Companion (Portland, OR: Amadeus Press, 1994)
- "Discontinuity and Proportion in the Music of Stravinsky," in Confronting Stravinsky (Berkeley: U. of California Press, 1986)

== Published compositions (music) ==
- About Face, orchestra (1989), pub. MMB
- Another Sunrise, mixed septet (1990), pub. MMB
- Atlanta Licks, mixed sextet (1984), pub. MMB
- Cincy in C, orchestra (1994), pub. MMB
- Licks, double bass trio with voice (1981), pub. MMB
- Moments in and out of Time, orchestra (1983), pub. G. Schirmer
- Music for Piano, Number 5 (1980), pub. G. Schirmer
- Musica Pro Musica, orchestra (1987), pub. MMB
- No Beginning, No End, chorus with orchestra (1983), pub. MMB
- Notta Sonata, 2 pianos with 2–3 percussion (1993), pub. MMB
- Obsessions, symphonic wind ensemble (2001), pub. MMB
- One for Five in Seven, Mostly, woodwind quintet (1971), pub. MMB
- Remembrance of a People, string orchestra with piano and optional narrator (1996), pub. MMB
- Renascence, clarinet with electronics (1974), pub. G. Schirmer
- Rewind: A Semi-Suite, orchestra (2000/2003), pub. MMB
- Serbelloni Serenade, clarinet, violin and piano (1995), pub. MMB
