= Vox Records =

Budget classical record label

Vox Classics
- Parent company: Naxos Music Group
- Founded: 1945; 81 years ago
- Founder: George Mendelssohn-Bartholdy
- Distributor: Naxos Records
- Genre: Western classical music
- Country of origin: United States
- Location: Nashville, Tennessee
- Official website: www.naxos.com/labels/vox-cd.htm www.voxclassics.com

Vox Records is a budget classical record label. The name is Latin for "voice."

Some Vox releases such as Peter Frankl's Debussy Piano Works and György Sándor's Complete Prokofiev Sonatas were reissued in premium vinyl boxsets by the audiophile German FSM Records Hamburg. The Brendel Complete Beethoven Sonatas were remastered from the original tapes for SACD and for HD downloads.

== History ==
Vox was founded in 1945 in New York by George Mendelssohn-Bartholdy, a Hungarian Jewish immigrant. Starting out with 78-rpm discs, it specialized in licensed pressings of European classical recordings. It was one of the last major recording companies to adopt stereo recording, in about 1957. The company's output featured the "Vox Box", compilations of music by specific composers, such as piano music of Chopin, Tchaikovsky, and Ravel; the complete symphonies and orchestral music of Rachmaninoff; rarely heard orchestral music by Tchaikovsky, Massenet, and Rimsky-Korsakov; the complete orchestral music of the French composer Erik Satie; and one of the most complete collections of the music of the early American composer Louis Moreau Gottschalk.

Vox maintained several subsidiary labels including Turnabout and Candide. Both labels generally focused on contemporary music. In recent years, select Vox recordings were rereleased on the Excelsior label.

Although Vox specializes in imported recordings, it has also recorded the Utah Symphony Orchestra under Maurice Abravanel, the Saint Louis Symphony Orchestra under Leonard Slatkin and Walter Susskind, the Minnesota Orchestra under Stanisław Skrowaczewski, and the Cincinnati Symphony Orchestra under Thomas Schippers, Walter Susskind and Michael Gielen.

In the early 1970s, Vox and its subsidiaries issued a number of compatible quadraphonic/stereophonic recordings using the Sansui QS quadraphonic matrix system; some of the ambience can still be heard when the CD versions are played with an amplifier with Dolby decoding and four speakers. One of these was the first album made by the Atlanta Symphony Orchestra and Chorus, led by Robert Shaw, a 2-LP set entitled Nativity.

Many of its recordings were later issued on CD and saw great success with its series of budget-price Vox Boxes. The company has continued a program of new releases, too, by such orchestras as the New Zealand Symphony Orchestra.

In 1978, the label was acquired by Moss Music Group and later managed for years by Mark Jenkins of Countdown Media. In 2018, the Vox label group was acquired by the Naxos Music Group.

== Notable releases ==
In the course of its existence, Vox displayed a willingness to explore unusual literature and a penchant for covering broad swaths of repertory in comprehensive releases. Among its numerous noteworthy issues were the following:

- During the 1950s, Vox released the first nominally complete cycle of Schubert's piano sonatas on records, performed by the Austrian pianist Friedrich Wührer; it omitted a few fragmentary works but did include Ernst Krenek's rarely recorded completion of the Sonata in C Major, D. 840 (Reliquie). At first issued as single records with uniform jacket art, the series later appeared in two different sets of three Vox Boxes—one, with gold covers and red labels, monaural as originally recorded and the other, with white covers and purple labels, rechanneled for ersatz stereo. Vox subsequently replaced Wührer's cycle with one in true stereo recorded by Walter Klien; unlike its predecessor, the latter set has appeared in CD reissues as noted below.
- Vox released one of the few complete recordings of Tchaikovsky's rarely heard third piano concerto, as reconstructed by Sergei Ivanovich Taneyev (1856–1915), with pianist Michael Ponti. This performance has been included in a Vox Box (released in 1991) featuring Tchaikovsky's three piano concertos and the seldom-performed Concert Fantasy, Op. 56, all performed by Ponti, with the Prague Symphony Orchestra conducted by Richard Kapp (in the first and second concertos and the fantasy) and the Orchestra of Radio Luxembourg conducted by Louis de Froment.
- Vox issued recordings of the French composer Darius Milhaud directing the Luxembourg Philharmonic in his complete symphonies.
- In the 1960s pianist Frank Glazer recorded the complete piano music of Erik Satie for Vox. This recording was declared "the finest interpretation of the piano music of Eric Satie".

== Catalogue ==
A partial listing of Vox recordings available on vinyl, cassette, CD, and all digital platforms includes the following:

- 25 Classics Series
  - 25 Baby Favorites
  - 25 Bach Favorites
  - 25 Ballet Favorites
  - 25 Baroque Favorites
  - 25 Beethoven Favorites
  - 25 Best Selling Favorites of All Time
  - 25 Candlelight Favorites
  - 25 Children's Favorites
  - 25 Classical Christian Favorites
  - 25 Classical Dance Favorites
  - 25 Classical Favorites
  - 25 Classical Heartbreakers
  - 25 Classical One Hit Wonders
  - 25 Concerto Favorites
  - 25 Guitar Favorites
  - 25 Handel Favorites
  - 25 Instrumental Favorites
  - 25 Intimate Chamber Favorites
  - 25 Light Opera Favorites
  - 25 Marching Favorites
  - 25 Mellow Piano Favorites
  - 25 More Beethoven Favorites
  - 25 More Mozart Favorites
  - 25 Movie Favorites
  - 25 Mozart Favorites
  - 25 Mystical Chant Favorites
  - 25 Opera Favorites
  - 25 Organ Favorites
  - 25 Piano Favorites
  - 25 Relaxing Classics
  - 25 Romantic Classics
  - 25 Romantic Moods
  - 25 Romantic Strings (25 Romantic String Favorites)
  - 25 Sacred Choral Favorites
  - 25 Sensual Flute Favorites
  - 25 Sentimental Favorites
  - 25 Spanish Guitar Favorites
  - 25 Strauss Favorites
  - 25 Symphony Favorites
  - 25 Tchaikovsky Favorites
  - 25 Thunderous Classics
  - 25 Tranquil Classics
  - 25 Ultimate Classics
  - 25 Violin Favorites
  - 25 Vivaldi Favorites
  - 25 Wedding Favorites
- 75 Greatest Classics, Volume 1
- 75 Greatest Classics, Volume 2
- 75 Greatest Classics, Volume 3
- 75 Greatest Classics, Volume 4
- Early Romantic Piano Concertos - Clementi, Hummel, et al.
- Alfred Brendel Plays Mozart with Walter Klien
- Ionisation - Music of Varèse, Penderecki and Ligeti
- Milhaud: 6 Little Symphonies, etc. / Milhaud, Luxembourg RSO
- Beethoven: Variations & Vignettes for Piano / Alfred Brendel
- Americana - Siegmeister, Ines, Copland, Gould, Sousa
- Debussy: Solo Piano Music Vol 1 / Peter Frankl
- Debussy: Solo Piano Music Vol 2 / Peter Frankl
- Romantic Piano Concerto Vol 1 / Michael Ponti
- Manuel Barrueco - 300 Years of Guitar Masterpieces
- Gottschalk Festival / Eugene List, Igor Buketoff
- Saint-Saëns: Complete String Concertos
- Mozart: The Complete Masonic Music / Maag, Equiluz, Rapf
- Alfred Brendel plays Schubert
- L'Esprit de France - The Music of Satie
- Schubert: Complete Piano Sonatas Vol 1 / Walter Klien
- Schubert: Complete Piano Sonatas Vol 2 / Walter Klien
- Schubert: Complete Piano Sonatas Vol 3 / Walter Klien
- Mozart: Piano Sonatas Vol 1 / Walter Klien
- Mozart: Piano Sonatas Vol 2 / Walter Klien
- Mozart: Twelve Great Piano Concertos / Klien, Brendel, et al.
- Complete Gershwin- Works for Piano & Orchestra / Siegel
- Saint-Saëns: Complete Works for Piano / Dosse, Petit
- Young [Alfred] Brendel - The Vox Years
- American as Apple Pie / Erich Kunzel, Cincinnati Pops
- American String Quartets 1950-1970 / Concord String Quartet
- 20th Century Voices in America - Rochberg, Cage, Carter, etc.
- Aaron Rosand plays Ernst, Godard, Lehár, Hubay, Ysaÿe, et al.
- Abbey Simon plays Chopin: Etudes and Waltzes Complete
- Alfred Brendel Plays Beethoven Piano Sonatas, Vol I
- Alfred Brendel Plays Beethoven Piano Sonatas, Vol II
- Alfred Brendel Plays Beethoven Piano Sonatas, Vol III
- American Composers Series - American Orchestral Music
- American Composers Series - Homespun America
- American Composers Series - Music of Samuel Barber
- American Composers Series - The Incredible Flutist
- Art of Ruggiero Ricci
- Bach: 24 Preludes and Fugues, Vol 2 / Anthony Newman
- Bach: Orchestral Suites, etc. / Kehr, Faerber, et al. Box Set
- Bartók: Complete Solo Piano Music / György Sándor
- Beethoven: Complete Chamber Music for Flute / JP Rampal
- Beethoven: Diabelli Variations, Bagatelles, etc. / Brendel
- Beethoven: Piano Sonatas, Vol. 4 / Alfred Brendel
- Biber: Rosary Sonatas / Lautenbacher, Ewerhart, Koch
- Brahms, Mendelssohn et al. / Kalichstein-Laredo-Robinson Trio
- Brahms: Complete String Quartets, etc. / Tokyo String Quartet
- Brendel plays Mozart and Haydn - Piano Concertos
- Chavez: The Complete Symphonies / Mata, London SO
- Chopin: Complete Works for Piano / Abbey Simon
- Chopin: Sonatas, Ballades, Scherzos, etc. / Abbey Simon
- Concord String Quartet - Haydn, Dvořák, et al.
- Spotlight Series

- Spotlight on Brass
- Spotlight on Keyboard
- Spotlight on Percussion
- Spotlight on Strings
- Spotlight on Winds

== See also ==
- List of record labels
