= Neoconservative postmodernism =

In music, neoconservative postmodernism is "a sort of 'postmodernism of reaction'", which values "textual unity and organicism as totalizing musical structures" like "latter-day modernists".

Neoconservative modernism...critically engages modernism, but rejects it out of hand. Neoconservative composers employ premodern styles in an attempt to bring a new type of coherence to the 'heterogeneous present' and re-establish the dominance of Western musical practice. Jann Pasler notes the musical characteristics that are indicative of a neoconservative postmodernism: "In music, we all know about the nostalgia that has gripped composers in recent years, resulting in neo-romantic works ... the sudden popularity of writing operas and symphonies again, of construing one's ideas in tonal terms. ...Many of those returning to romantic sentiment, narrative curve, or simple melody wish to entice audiences back to the concert hall. To the extent that these developments are a true "about face," they represent a postmodernism of reaction, a return to pre-modernist musical thinking [emphasis added].

Neoconservative "postmodernism is understood as a 'return to the verities of tradition (in art, family, religion...)' ... where, crucially, modernism 'is reduced to a style ... and condemned or excised entirely as a cultural mistake; pre- and postmodern elements are then elided, and the humanist tradition is preserved.'"

== Notable composers ==
- Fred Lerdahl
- John Harbison
- Steve Reich

== See also ==
- Minimalist music
- Neoromanticism
- Postmodern music
