= Music for the Requiem Mass =

Music for the Requiem Mass is any music that accompanies the Requiem, or Mass for the Dead, in the Catholic Church. This church service has inspired hundreds of compositions, including settings by Victoria, Mozart, Berlioz, Verdi, Fauré, Dvořák, Duruflé and Britten. For centuries settings of the Mass for the Dead were to be chanted in liturgical service monophonically. Later the settings became polyphonic, Victoria's famous 1605 a cappella work being an example. By Mozart's time (1791) it was standard to embed the dramatic and long Dies irae (Day of Wrath) sequence, and to score with orchestra. Eventually many settings of the Requiem, not least Verdi's (1874), were essentially concert pieces unsuitable for church service.

Incipit of the Gregorian chant introit for a Requiem Mass, from the Liber Usualis.

== Common texts ==
The following are the texts that have been set to music. Note that the Libera Me and the In Paradisum are not part of the text of the Catholic Mass for the Dead itself, but a part of the burial rite that immediately follows. In Paradisum was traditionally said or sung as the body left the church, and the Libera Me is said/sung at the burial site before interment. These became included in musical settings of the Requiem in the 19th century as composers began to treat the form more liberally.

=== Introit ===
From 4 Esdras 2:34–35; Psalm 65:1-2

Requiem æternam dona eis, Domine:
et lux perpetua luceat eis.
Te decet hymnus, Deus, in Sion,
et tibi reddetur votum in Ierusalem:
exaudi orationem meam,
ad te omnis caro veniet.
Requiem æternam dona eis, Domine:
et lux perpetua luceat eis.

Eternal rest give unto them, O Lord,
and let perpetual light shine upon them.
A hymn, O God, becometh Thee in Zion;
and a vow shall be paid to Thee in Jerusalem:
hear my prayer;
all flesh shall come to Thee.
Eternal rest give unto them, O Lord,
and let perpetual light shine upon them.

=== Kyrie eleison ===
This is as the Kyrie in the Ordinary of the Mass:

Kyrie, eleison.
Christe, eleison.
Kyrie, eleison.

Lord, have mercy.
Christ, have mercy.
Lord, have mercy.

This is Greek (Κύριε ἐλέησον, Χριστὲ ἐλέησον, Κύριε ἐλέησον). Each utterance is sung three times, though sometimes that is not the case when sung polyphonically.

=== Gradual ===
From 4 Esdras 2:34–35; Psalm 112:6

Requiem æternam dona eis, Domine:
et lux perpetua luceat eis.
In memoria æterna erit iustus:
ab auditione mala non timebit.

Eternal rest give unto them, O Lord;
and let perpetual light shine upon them.
The just shall be in everlasting remembrance;
he shall not fear the evil hearing.

=== Tract ===
Absolve, Domine,
animas omnium fidelium defunctorum
ab omni vinculo delictorum.
Et gratia tua illis succurrente,
mereantur evadere iudicium ultionis.
Et lucis æternae beatitudine perfrui.

Absolve, O Lord,
the souls of all the faithful departed
from every bond of sin.
And by the help of Thy grace
may they be enabled to escape the avenging judgment.
And enjoy the bliss of everlasting light.

=== Sequence ===
A sequence is a liturgical poem sung, when used, after the Tract (or Alleluia, if present). The sequence employed in the Requiem, Dies irae, attributed to Thomas of Celano (c. 1200 – c. 1260–1270), has been called "the greatest of hymns", worthy of "supreme admiration". The Latin text is included in the Requiem Mass in the 1962 Roman Missal. An early English version was translated by William Josiah Irons in 1849.

=== Offertory ===
Domine Iesu Christe, Rex gloriæ,
libera animas omnium fidelium defunctorum
de pœnis inferni et de profundo lacu:
libera eas de ore leonis,
ne absorbeat eas tartarus,
ne cadant in obscurum:
sed signifer sanctus Michael
repræsentet eas in lucem sanctam:
Quam olim Abrahæ promisisti, et semini eius.

Lord Jesus Christ, King of glory,
deliver the souls of all the faithful departed
from the pains of hell and from the bottomless pit:
deliver them from the lion's mouth,
that Tartarus swallow them not up,
that they fall not into darkness,
but let the standard-bearer holy Michael
lead them into that holy light:
Which Thou didst promise of old to Abraham and to his seed.

Hostias et preces tibi, Domine,
laudis offerimus:
tu suscipe pro animabus illis,
quarum hodie memoriam facimus:
fac eas, Domine, de morte transire ad vitam.
Quam olim Abrahæ promisisti, et semini eius.

We offer to Thee, O Lord,
sacrifices and prayers:
do Thou receive them in behalf of those souls
of whom we make memorial this day.
Grant them, O Lord, to pass from death to that life,
Which Thou didst promise of old to Abraham and to his seed.

=== Sanctus ===
This is as the Sanctus prayer in the Ordinary of the Mass:

Sanctus, Sanctus, Sanctus
Dominus Deus Sabaoth.
Pleni sunt cæli et terra gloria tua.
Hosanna in excelsis.

Benedictus qui venit in nomine Domini.
Hosanna in excelsis.

Holy, holy, holy,
Lord God of Hosts.
Heaven and earth are full of Thy glory.
Hosanna in the highest.

Blessed is He Who cometh in the Name of the Lord.
Hosanna in the highest.

=== Agnus Dei ===
This is as the Agnus Dei in the Ordinary of the Mass, but with the petitions miserere nobis changed to dona eis requiem, and dona nobis pacem to dona eis requiem sempiternam:

Agnus Dei, qui tollis peccata mundi: dona eis requiem.
Agnus Dei, qui tollis peccata mundi: dona eis requiem.
Agnus Dei, qui tollis peccata mundi: dona eis requiem sempiternam.

Lamb of God, Who takest away the sins of the world, grant them rest.
Lamb of God, Who takest away the sins of the world, grant them rest.
Lamb of God, Who takest away the sins of the world, grant them eternal rest.

=== Lux æterna ===
Lux æterna luceat eis, Domine:
Cum Sanctis tuis in æternum:
quia pius es.
Requiem æternam dona eis, Domine:
et lux perpetua luceat eis.
Cum Sanctis tuis in æternum:
quia pius es.

May light eternal shine upon them, O Lord,
with Thy Saints for evermore:
for Thou art gracious.
Eternal rest give to them, O Lord,
and let perpetual light shine upon them:
With Thy Saints for evermore,
for Thou art gracious.

As mentioned above, there is no Gloria, Alleluia or Credo in these musical settings.

=== Pie Jesu ===
Some text extracts have been set to music independently, such as the Pie Jesu in the settings of Fauré (1880s), Dvořák (1890s), Duruflé (1940s) and Rutter (later). Pie Jesu are late words in the Dies irae and they are followed by the final words of the Agnus Dei:

Pie Jesu Domine, dona eis requiem.
Dona eis requiem sempiternam.

Merciful Lord Jesus, grant them rest;
grant them eternal rest.

Settings sometimes include passages from the "Absolution at the bier" (Absolutio ad feretrum) or "Commendation of the dead person" (referred to also as the Absolution of the dead), which in the case of a funeral, follows the conclusion of the Mass.

=== Libera me ===
Libera me, Domine, de morte æterna, in die illa tremenda:
Quando cæli movendi sunt et terra:
Dum veneris iudicare sæculum per ignem.
Tremens factus sum ego, et timeo, dum discussio venerit, atque ventura ira.
Quando cæli movendi sunt et terra.
Dies illa, dies iræ, calamitatis et miseriæ, dies magna et amara valde.
Dum veneris iudicare sæculum per ignem.
Requiem æternam dona eis, Domine: et lux perpetua luceat eis.

Deliver me, O Lord, from death eternal in that awful day.
When the heavens and the earth shall be moved:
When Thou shalt come to judge the world by fire.
Dread and trembling have laid hold on me, and I fear exceedingly because of the judgment and of the wrath to come.
When the heavens and the earth shall be moved.
O that day, that day of wrath, of sore distress and of all wretchedness, that great day and exceeding bitter.
When Thou shalt come to judge the world by fire.
Eternal rest grant unto them, O Lord, and let perpetual light shine upon them.

=== In paradisum ===
In paradisum deducant te Angeli:
in tuo adventu suscipiant te Martyres,
et perducant te in civitatem sanctam Jerusalem.
Chorus Angelorum te suscipiat,
et cum Lazaro quondam paupere æternam habeas requiem.

May the Angels lead thee into paradise:
may the Martyrs receive thee at thy coming,
and lead thee into the holy city of Jerusalem.
May the choir of Angels receive thee,
and with Lazarus, who once was poor, mayest thou have eternal rest.

== History of musical compositions ==
For many centuries the texts of the requiem were sung to Gregorian melodies. The Requiem by Johannes Ockeghem, written sometime in the later half of the 15th century, is the earliest surviving polyphonic setting. There was a setting by the elder composer Guillaume Du Fay, possibly earlier, which is now lost: Ockeghem's may have been modelled on it. Many early compositions employ different texts that were in use in different liturgies around Europe before the Council of Trent set down the texts given above. The requiem of Brumel, circa 1500, is the first to include the Dies Iræ. In the early polyphonic settings of the Requiem, there is considerable textural contrast within the compositions themselves: simple chordal or fauxbourdon-like passages are contrasted with other sections of contrapuntal complexity, such as in the Offertory of Ockeghem's Requiem.

In the 16th century, more and more composers set the Requiem mass. In contrast to practice in setting the Mass Ordinary, many of these settings used a cantus-firmus technique, something which had become quite archaic by mid-century. In addition, these settings used less textural contrast than the early settings by Ockeghem and Brumel, although the vocal scoring was often richer, for example in the six-voice Requiem by Jean Richafort which he wrote for the death of Josquin des Prez. Other composers before 1550 include Pedro de Escobar, Antoine de Févin, Cristóbal de Morales, and Pierre de la Rue; that by la Rue is probably the second oldest, after Ockeghem's.

Over 2,000 Requiem compositions have been composed to the present day. Typically the Renaissance settings, especially those not written on the Iberian Peninsula, may be performed a cappella (i.e. without accompanying instrumental parts), whereas, beginning around 1600 composers more often preferred to use instruments to accompany a choir, and also include vocal soloists. There is great variation between compositions in how much of the liturgical text is set to music.

Most composers omit sections of the liturgical prescription, most frequently the Gradual and the Tract. Fauré omits the Dies iræ, while the very same text had often been set by French composers in previous centuries as a stand-alone work.

Sometimes composers divide an item of the liturgical text into two or more movements; because of the length of its text, the Dies iræ is the most frequently divided section of the text (as with Mozart, for instance). The Introit and Kyrie, being immediately adjacent in the actual Roman Catholic liturgy, are often composed as one movement.

Musico-thematic relationships among movements within a Requiem can be found as well.

=== Requiem in concert ===
Beginning in the 18th century and continuing through the 19th, many composers wrote what are effectively concert works, which, by virtue of employing forces too large, or lasting such a considerable duration, prevent them being readily used in an ordinary funeral service; the requiems of Gossec, Berlioz, Verdi, and Dvořák are essentially dramatic concert oratorios. A counter-reaction to this tendency came from the Cecilian movement, which recommended restrained accompaniment for liturgical music, and frowned upon the use of operatic vocal soloists.

== Notable compositions ==
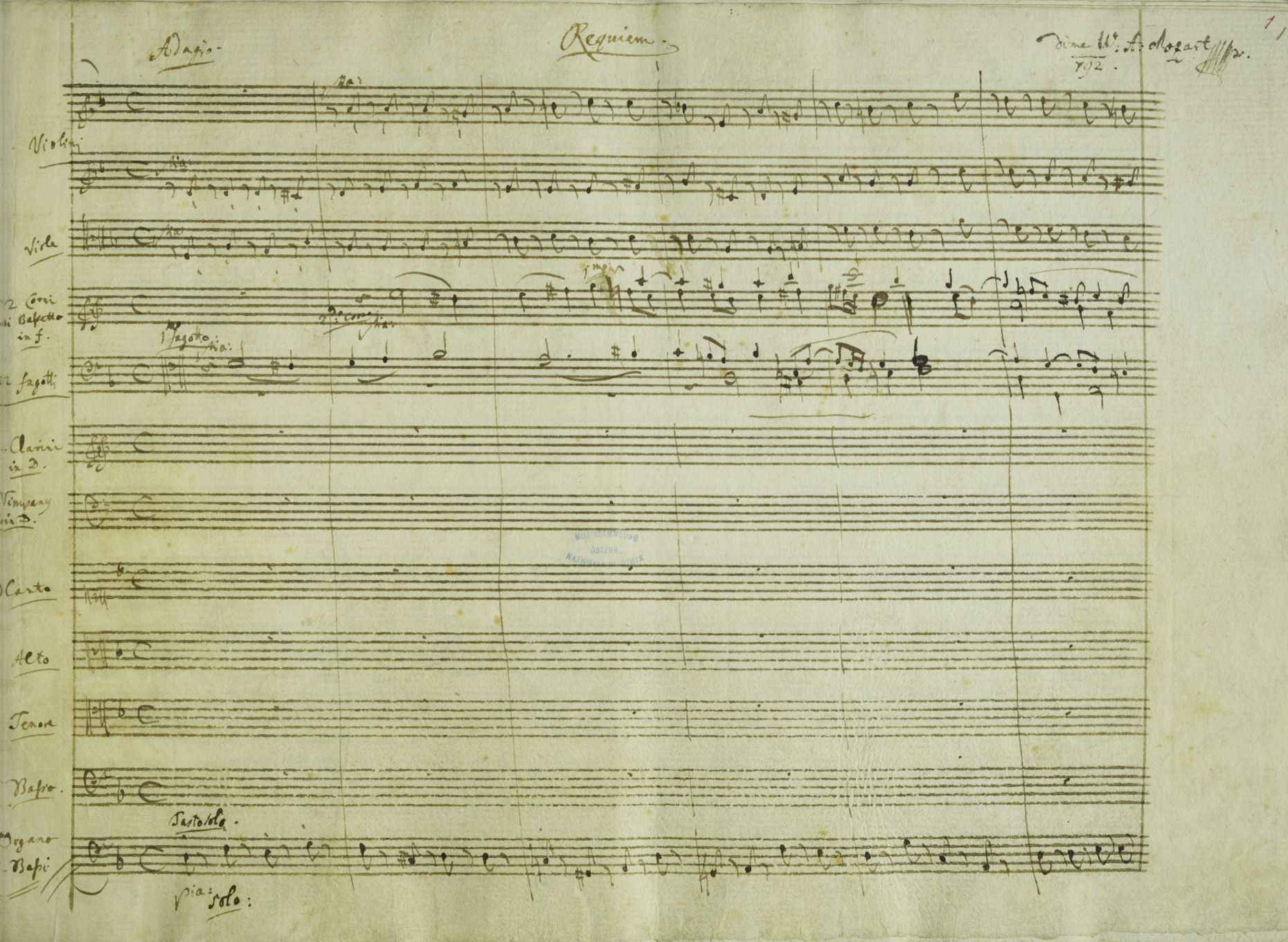
A portion of the manuscript of Mozart's Requiem, K 626 (1791), showing his heading for the first movement.

Many composers have composed a Requiem. Some of the most notable include the following (in chronological order):

- Ockeghem: Requiem, the earliest to survive, written in the mid-to-late 15th century
- Morales: Two notable requiems: Officium defunctorum (ca. 1526–28) and Missa pro defunctis (1544).
- Guerrero: Requiem (Missa pro defunctis), 1582.
- Victoria: Requiem of 1603 (part of a longer Office of the Dead)
- Fux: Kaiserrequiem, 1720.
- Zelenka: Requiem in D minor, ZWV 48 After Augustus the Strong Circa 1730
- Michael Haydn: Requiem in C minor, 1771.
- Mozart: Requiem, K. 626 (1791: Mozart died before its completion; Franz Xaver Süssmayr's completion is often used)
- Salieri: Requiem (1804) (played at his funeral on May 7, 1825)
- Cherubini: Requiem in C minor (1815) and Requiem in D minor (1836)
- Berlioz: Grande Messe des morts (1837)
- Schumann: Requiem, Op. 148 (1852)
- Verdi: Messa da Requiem (1874)
- Saint-Saëns: Messe de Requiem (1878)
- Dvořák: Requiem, Op. 89 (1890)
- Fauré: Requiem, Op. 48 (1890)
- Delius: Requiem (1916)
- Duruflé: Requiem, Op. 9, based almost exclusively on the chants from the Graduale Romanum (1947)
- Britten: War Requiem, Op. 66, which incorporated poems by Wilfred Owen (1962)
- Stravinsky: Requiem Canticles (1966)
- Penderecki: Polish Requiem (1984, revised 1993 and 2005)
- Lloyd Webber: Requiem (1985)
- Rutter: Requiem, includes Psalm 130, Psalm 23 and words from the Book of Common Prayer (1985)
- Wilberg: Requiem (2008)

== Other composers ==
=== Renaissance ===
- Giovanni Francesco Anerio
- Gianmatteo Asola
- Giulio Belli
- Antoine Brumel
- Manuel Cardoso
- Joan Cererols
- Pierre Certon
- Jacob Clemens non Papa
- Guillaume Du Fay (lost)
- Pedro de Escobar
- Antoine de Févin
- Francisco Guerrero
- Jacobus de Kerle
- Orlando di Lasso
- Duarte Lobo
- Jean Maillard
- Jacques Mauduit
- Manuel Mendes
- Cristóbal de Morales
- Johannes Ockeghem (the earliest to survive)
- Giovanni Pierluigi da Palestrina
- Pietro Pontio (2 for four voices—both incomplete—and one for five low voices)
- Costanzo Porta
- Johannes Prioris
- Jean Richafort
- Pierre de la Rue
- Pedro Ruimonte
- Claudin de Sermisy
- Jacobus Vaet
- Tomás Luis de Victoria

=== Baroque ===
- Giovanni Francesco Anerio
- Johann Christian Bach (1757)
- Steffano Bernardi (1628)
- Heinrich Ignaz Franz Biber (1691)
- Carl Heinrich Biber (H.I.F. Biber's son, 1740)
- Antonio Caldara (1723)
- André Campra (1725)
- Francesco Cavalli (1672)
- Marc-Antoine Charpentier H.2, H.7, H.10, H.12, H.234 (1670 - 1690)
- Francesco Durante (1738 in G minor, 1746 in C minor)
- Johann Joseph Fux (Kaiserrequiem, 1720)
- Jean Gilles (1705)
- Johann David Heinichen (1726)
- Johann Caspar Kerll (1689)
- Duarte Lobo (1639)
- Antonio Lotti (Requiem in F Major) (1715)
- Benedetto Marcello (Requiem in the Venetian Manner, 1729)
- Claudio Monteverdi (lost)
- Michael Praetorius
- Johann Rosenmüller (1660)
- Bonaventura Rubino (1653)
- Heinrich Schütz (Musikalische Exequien, 1636)
- Andrzej Siewiński
- Philippus van Steelant (Antwerp Requiem, 1650)
- František Tůma (1742)
- Jan Dismas Zelenka (1733)

=== Classical period ===
- Johann Georg Albrechtsberger
- Franz Joseph Aumann
- Johann Christian Bach (1757)
- Domenico Cimarosa (1787)
- Carl Ditters von Dittersdorf (1784)
- Joseph Leopold Eybler (1803)
- Johann Joseph Fux (1720)
- Florian Leopold Gassmann
- François-Joseph Gossec (1760)
- Johann Adolf Hasse (1763)
- Michael Haydn (1771)
- Amandus Ivanschiz
- Niccolò Jommelli (1756)
- Józef Kozłowski (1798)
- Joseph Martin Kraus (1775)
- Andrea Luchesi (1771)
- Giovanni Battista Martini
- Wolfgang Amadeus Mozart (1791)
- Georg Pasterwitz
- Giovanni Platti (1752)
- Ignaz Pleyel
- Anton Reicha (1805)
- Franz Xaver Richter (1789)
- Antonio Salieri (1805)
- Václav Tomášek
- Georg Joseph Vogler (1808)
- Jan Zach (1762)

=== Romantic era ===
- Hector Berlioz (1837)
- João Domingos Bomtempo (1820)
- Giovanni Bottesini (1877)
- Johannes Brahms (1865–68)
- Anton Bruckner, Requiem in D minor (1849)
- Alfred Bruneau (1883)
- Ferruccio Busoni
- Luigi Cherubini (For Louis XVI, 1816)
- Peter Cornelius (1867)
- Carl Czerny
- Gaetano Donizetti: Requiem in D minor (for Bellini, 1835)
- Felix Draeseke (1880-1881)
- Antonín Dvořák (1890)
- Gabriel Fauré (1888)
- Charles Gounod (1891-93)
- Théodore Gouvy (1874)
- Asger Hamerik (1887)
- Friedrich Kiel (1862)
- Franz Lachner (1865)
- Franz Liszt (1871)
- Jean-Paul-Égide Martini (For Louis XVI & Marie Antoinette, 1815)
- Saverio Mercadante (Requiem breve, 1836)
- Sigismund von Neukomm (1815)
- José Maurício Nunes Garcia (1816)
- Lorenzo Perosi (1897)
- Giacomo Puccini [Introit only]
- Max Reger, Hebbel Requiem (1916), Lateinisches Requiem (fragment, 1915)
- Josef Rheinberger (1899)
- Antonín Rejcha (1805)
- Camille Saint-Saëns (1878)
- Robert Schumann (1852)
- Giovanni Sgambati (1901)
- Franz von Suppé (1855)
- Charles Villiers Stanford (1896)
- Sergei Taneyev (John of Damascus, a Russian Requiem, 1883)
- Giuseppe Verdi (1874)
- See also: Messa per Rossini

=== 20th century ===
- Mark Alburger
- Malcolm Archer
- Max Reger (1915)
- Vyacheslav Artyomov (1987)
- Osvaldas Balakauskas
- Benjamin Britten (1940)
- Gavin Bryars
- Sylvano Bussotti: "Rara Requiem" (1969)
- Pavel Chesnokov (1914)
- Michel Chion
- Vladimir Dashkevich
- James DeMars: "An American Requiem"
- Edison Denisov
- Alfred Desenclos (1963)
- Felix Draeseke (1910)
- Ralph Dunstan
- Maurice Duruflé
- Lorenzo Ferrero: Introito, part of the Requiem per le vittime della mafia
- Gerald Finzi: Requiem da camera
- John Foulds: "A World Requiem"
- Julius Fučík (1915)
- Howard Goodall: "Eternal Light: A Requiem"
- Sandro Gorli: Requiem
- William Harper
- Hans Werner Henze
- Frigyes Hidas
- Herbert Howells (1932)
- Sigurd Islandsmoen (1935)
- Karl Jenkins (2005)
- Dmitry Kabalevsky (1962)
- Volker David Kirchner
- Ståle Kleiberg
- Joonas Kokkonen
- Cyrillus Kreek (1927)
- Huub de Lange
- Morten Lauridsen: "Lux Aeterna"
- Philip Ledger
- Kamilló Lendvay
- György Ligeti (1965)
- Nils Lindberg
- Andrew Lloyd Webber (1984)
- Fernando Lopes-Graça
- Roman Maciejewski (1959)
- Bruno Maderna (1946)
- Frank Martin: Requiem (1972)
- Jean-Christian Michel
- Otto Olsson (1903)
- Ildebrando Pizzetti (1968)
- Jocelyn Pook
- Zbigniew Preisner: "Requiem for My Friend"
- Aaron Robinson: "An American Requiem" (1997)
- John Rutter (1985)
- Joseph Ryelandt
- Shigeaki Saegusa
- Alfred Schnittke
- Valentin Silvestrov: "Requiem for Larissa" (1999)
- Fredrik Sixten (1984)
- Robert Steadman
- Igor Stravinsky (1966)
- Toru Takemitsu (for string orchestra, 1957)
- John Tavener
- Mikis Theodorakis (1999)
- Virgil Thomson
- Erkki-Sven Tüür
- Richard Wetz (1924)
- Malcolm Williamson
- Bernd Alois Zimmermann: Requiem für einen jungen Dichter (1969)

=== 21st century ===
- Kim André Arnesen (2013-2014)
- Lera Auerbach: "Russian Requiem"
- Leonardo Balada: "No-res (Nothing) - An Agnostic Requiem"
- Virgin Black: "Requiem Trilogy"
- Jamie Brown: "A Cornish Requiem / Requiem Kernewek"
- Ashley Bryan: "A Tender Bridge"
- Gavin Bryars: "Cadman Requiem"
- Paul Carr: "Requiem for an Angel"
- Bob Chilcott
- Richard Danielpour: "An American Requiem" (2001)
- David Crowder Band: "Give Us Rest"
- Bradley Ellingboe
- Mohammed Fairouz: "Requiem Mass"
- Dan Forrest: "Requiem for the Living" (2013)
- Gabriela Lena Frank: "Conquest Requiem" (2017)
- Eliza Gilkyson, arr. by Craig Hella Johnson: "Requiem"
- Howard Goodall: "Eternal Light: A Requiem" (2008)
- Steve Gray: "Requiem For Choir and Big Band"
- Roman Grygoriv and Illia Razumeiko: "IYOV", opera-requiem for prepared piano, cello, drums and voices (2015)
- Xia Guan: "Earth Requiem" (2009)
- John Harbison: Requiem (2002)
- Patrick Hawes: "Lazarus Requiem"
- Tyzen Hsiao: "Ilha Formosa: Requiem for Formosa's Martyrs"
- Karl Jenkins: "Requiem" (2004)
- Rami Khalifé: "Requiem for Beirut" (2013)
- Iver Kleive
- Fan-Long Ko: "2-28 Requiem" (2008)
- Thierry Lancino
- György Ligeti: "Requiem" (2006)
- Christopher Rouse
- Carl Rütti: "Requiem" (2007)
- Kentaro Sato
- Alexander Shchetynsky (2004)
- Somtow Sucharitkul
- John Tavener: "A Celtic Requiem" (1969) / "Requiem" (2008)
- António Pinho Vargas
- Mack Wilberg: "Requiem" (2008)

=== Requiem by language (other than Latin) ===
English with Latin

- Benjamin Britten: War Requiem
- Richard Danielpour: An American Requiem
- Howard Goodall: "Eternal Light"
- Patrick Hawes "Lazarus Requiem"
- Paul Hindemith: When lilacs last in the dooryard bloom'd: A Requiem for those we love
- Herbert Howells
- John Rutter: Requiem
- Fredrik Sixten
- Sir Henry Walford Davies "A Short Requiem" (1915) 'In Sacred Memory of all those who have fallen in the war'
- Somtow Sucharitkul
- Mack Wilberg
- Aaron Robinson: "A Tender Bridge – An African American Requiem" (2018)

Cornish

- Jamie Brown: A Cornish Requiem / Requiem Kernewek

Estonian

- Cyrillus Kreek: Estonian Requiem

German

- Johannes Brahms: Ein deutsches Requiem
- Michael Praetorius
- Max Reger, Hebbel Requiem
- Franz Schubert
- Heinrich Schütz

French, Greek, with Latin

- Thierry Lancino

French, English, German with Latin

- Edison Denisov

Latin and Japanese

- Karl Jenkins: Requiem
- Hina Sakamoto: REQUIEM For the spirits of the victims of the Pacific War

Latin and German and others

- Bernd Alois Zimmermann: Requiem für einen jungen Dichter

Latin and Polish

- Krzysztof Penderecki: Polish Requiem
- Zbigniew Preisner: Requiem for my friend

Latin and 7th Century Northumbrian

- Gavin Bryars: Cadman Requiem

Russian

- Lera Auerbach – Russian Requiem, on Russian Orthodox sacred text and poetry
- Vladimir Dashkevich – Requiem (Text by Anna Akhmatova)
- Elena Firsova – Requiem, Op.100 (Text by Anna Akhmatova)
- Dmitri Kabalevsky – War Requiem (Text by Robert Rozhdestvensky)
- Sergei Taneyev – Cantata John of Damascus, Op.1 (Text by Alexey Tolstoy)

Chinese

- Tyzen Hsiao – Ilha Formosa: Requiem for Formosa's Martyrs, 2001 (Text by Min-yung Lee, 1994)
- Fan-Long Ko – 2-28 Requiem, 2008. (Text by Li Kuei-Hsien)
- Xia Guan – Earth Requiem, 2009. (Text by Lin Liu, Xiaoming Song)

Vietnamese

- Mỹ Sơn – Bộ lễ Cầu hồn.

Nonlinguistic

- Luciano Berio's Requies: in memoriam
- Benjamin Britten's Sinfonia da Requiem and Arthur Honegger's Symphonie Liturgique use titles from the traditional Requiem as subtitles of movements.
- Carlo Forlivesi – Requiem, for 8-channel tape
- Hans Werner Henze – Requiem (instrumental)
- Wojciech Kilar Requiem Father Kolbe
- Lansing McLoskey – Requiem, v.2.001 (versions for chamber sextet and orchestra)
- John Zorn – Missa Sine Voces (instrumental)

== Modern treatments ==
In the 20th century the requiem evolved in several new directions. One offshoot consists of compositions dedicated to the memory of people killed in wartime. These often include extra-liturgical poems of a pacifist or non-liturgical nature; for example, the War Requiem of Benjamin Britten juxtaposes the Latin text with the poetry of Wilfred Owen, Krzysztof Penderecki's Polish Requiem includes a traditional Polish hymn within the sequence, and Robert Steadman's Mass in Black intersperses environmental poetry and prophecies of Nostradamus. Holocaust Requiem may be regarded as a specific subset of this type. The World Requiem of John Foulds was written in the aftermath of the First World War and initiated the Royal British Legion's annual festival of remembrance. Recent requiem works by Taiwanese composers Tyzen Hsiao and Fan-Long Ko follow in this tradition, honouring victims of the February 28 Incident and subsequent White Terror.

Lastly, the 20th century saw the development of the secular Requiem, written for public performance without specific religious observance, such as Frederick Delius's Requiem, completed in 1916 and dedicated to "the memory of all young Artists fallen in the war", and Dmitry Kabalevsky's Requiem (Op. 72 – 1962), a setting of a poem written by Robert Rozhdestvensky especially for the composition. Herbert Howells's unaccompanied Requiem uses Psalm 23 ("The Lord is my shepherd"), Psalm 121 ("I will lift up mine eyes"), "Salvator mundi" ("O Saviour of the world," in English), "Requiem aeternam" (two different settings), and "I heard a voice from heaven." Some composers have written purely instrumental works bearing the title of requiem, as famously exemplified by Britten's Sinfonia da Requiem. Hans Werner Henze's Das Floß der Medusa, written in 1968 as a requiem for Che Guevara, is properly speaking an oratorio; Henze's Requiem is instrumental but retains the traditional Latin titles for the movements. Igor Stravinsky's Requiem Canticles mixes instrumental movements with segments of the "Introit," "Dies irae," "Pie Jesu," and "Libera me."

== See also ==
- Church music
- Mass (music)
- Oratorio
- Vocal music
