= Tuba mirum (disambiguation) =

Tuba mirum is a part of the Dies irae, a Latin poetic sequence used in Anglican and Catholic liturgies, especially the Requiem Mass.

Tuba mirum may also refer to:

== Musical compositions ==
- Requiem (Berlioz)
- War Requiem (Britten)
- Requiem (Dvořák)
- Requiem (Henze)
- Requiem (Mozart)
- Polish Requiem (Penderecki)
- Requiem (Schnittke); see Flexatone § Uses
- Requiem Canticles (Stravinsky)
- Requiem (Verdi)
- Messa per Rossini (a collective work by 13 composers)

== Other ==
- A musical instrument invented by the composer and parodist Peter Schickele
