= Requiem =

Mass for the dead

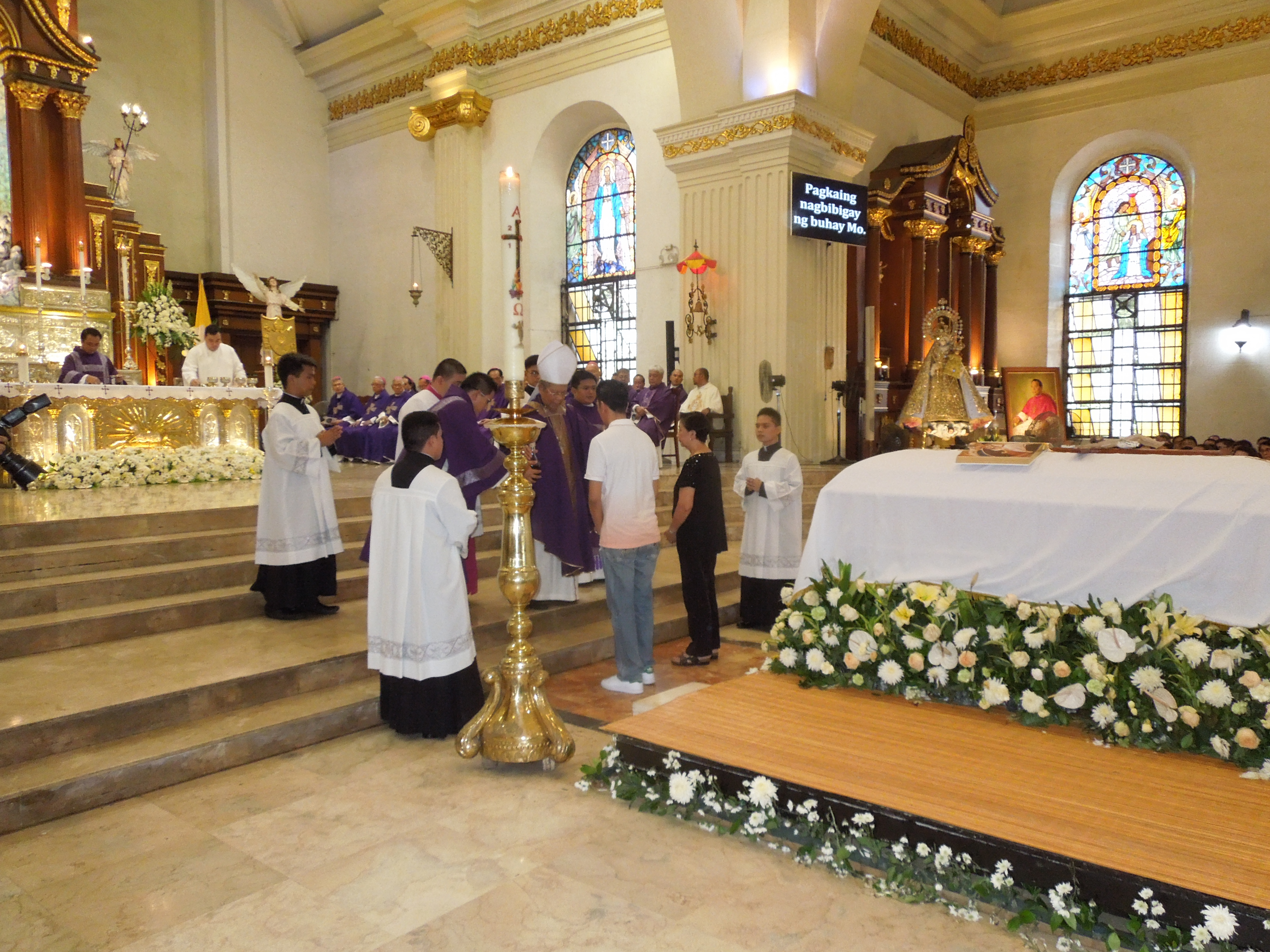
Requiem for Bishop Cirilo Almario, in the Mass of Paul VI at Minor Basilica and Cathedral of the Immaculate Conception, Malolos, Bulacan, 2016

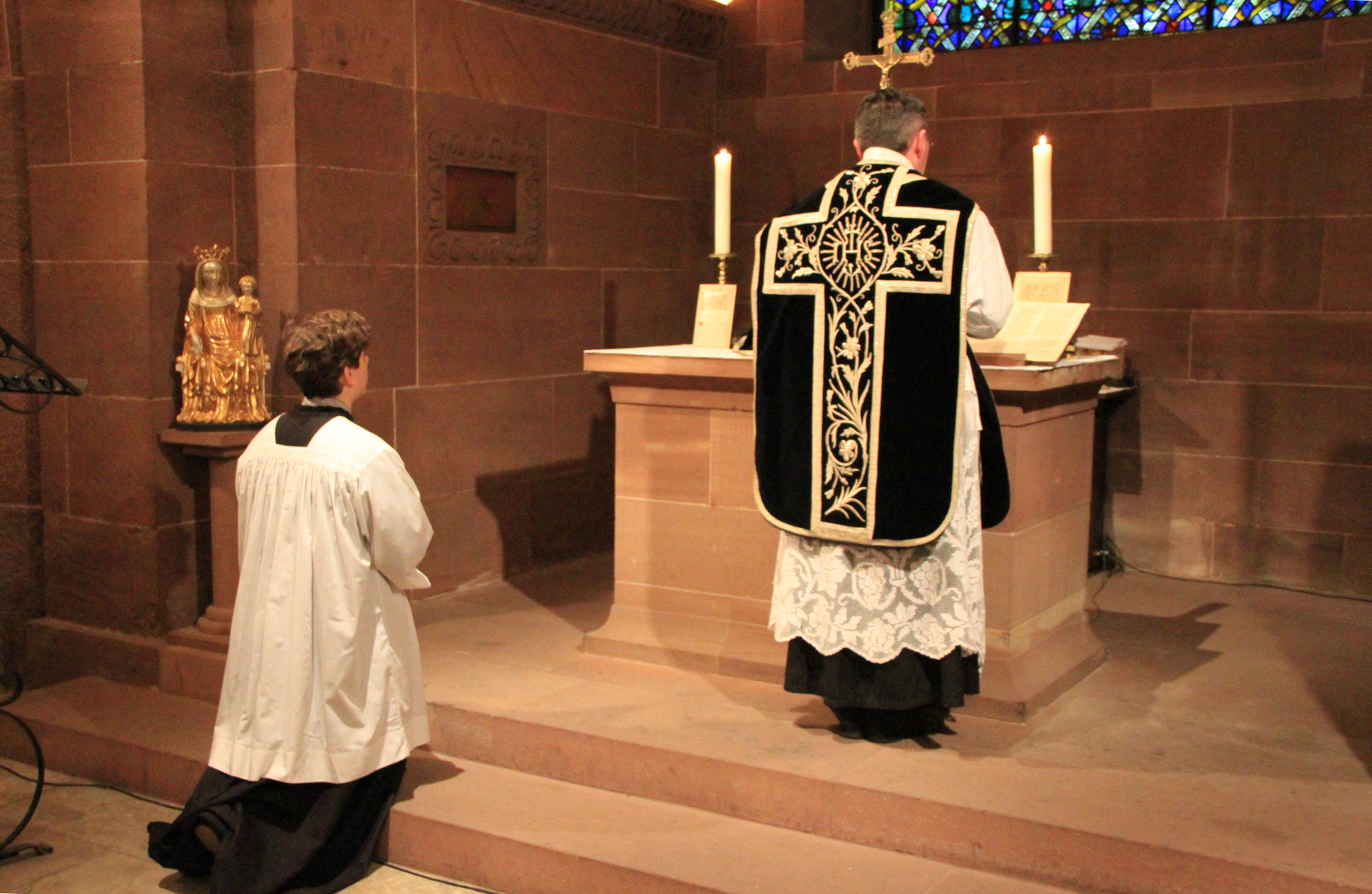
The Requiem, in the Tridentine Mass, celebrated annually for Louis XVI and victims of the French Revolution, in the crypt of Strasbourg Cathedral, 2013

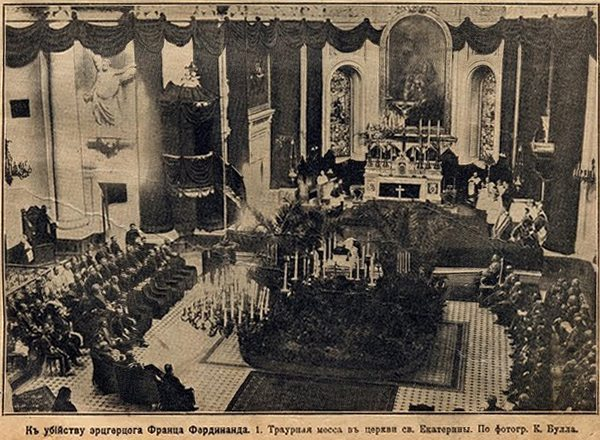
Requiem Mass for Archduke Franz Ferdinand of Austria at St. Catherine's Cathedral, St. Petersburg, published in a Russian newspaper, 1914

A Requiem (Latin for 'rest') or Requiem Mass, also known as Mass for the dead (Latin: Missa pro defunctis) or Mass of the dead (Latin: Missa defunctorum), is a Mass of the Catholic Church offered for the repose of the souls of the deceased, using a particular form of the Roman Missal. It is usually celebrated in the context of a funeral (where in some countries it is often called a Funeral Mass).

Musical settings of the propers of the Requiem Mass are also called Requiems, and the term has subsequently been applied to other musical compositions associated with death, dying, and mourning, even when they lack religious or liturgical relevance.

The term is also used for similar ceremonies outside the Catholic Church, especially in Evangelical-Lutheranism and Western Rite Orthodox Christianity, as well as in certain Anglican congregations of Anglo-Catholic churchmanship. A comparable service, with a wholly different ritual form and texts, exists in the Eastern Orthodox and Eastern Catholic churches as well as some Methodist churches.

The Mass and its settings draw their name from the introit of the liturgy, which begins with the words Requiem aeternam dona eis, Domine (Latin for "Eternal rest grant them, O Lord"), which is cited from 2 Esdras 2:34-35 — requiem is the accusative singular form of the Latin noun requies, "rest, repose". The Roman Missal as revised in 1970 employs this phrase as the first entrance antiphon among the formulas for Masses for the dead, and it remains in use to this day.

== Liturgical rite ==
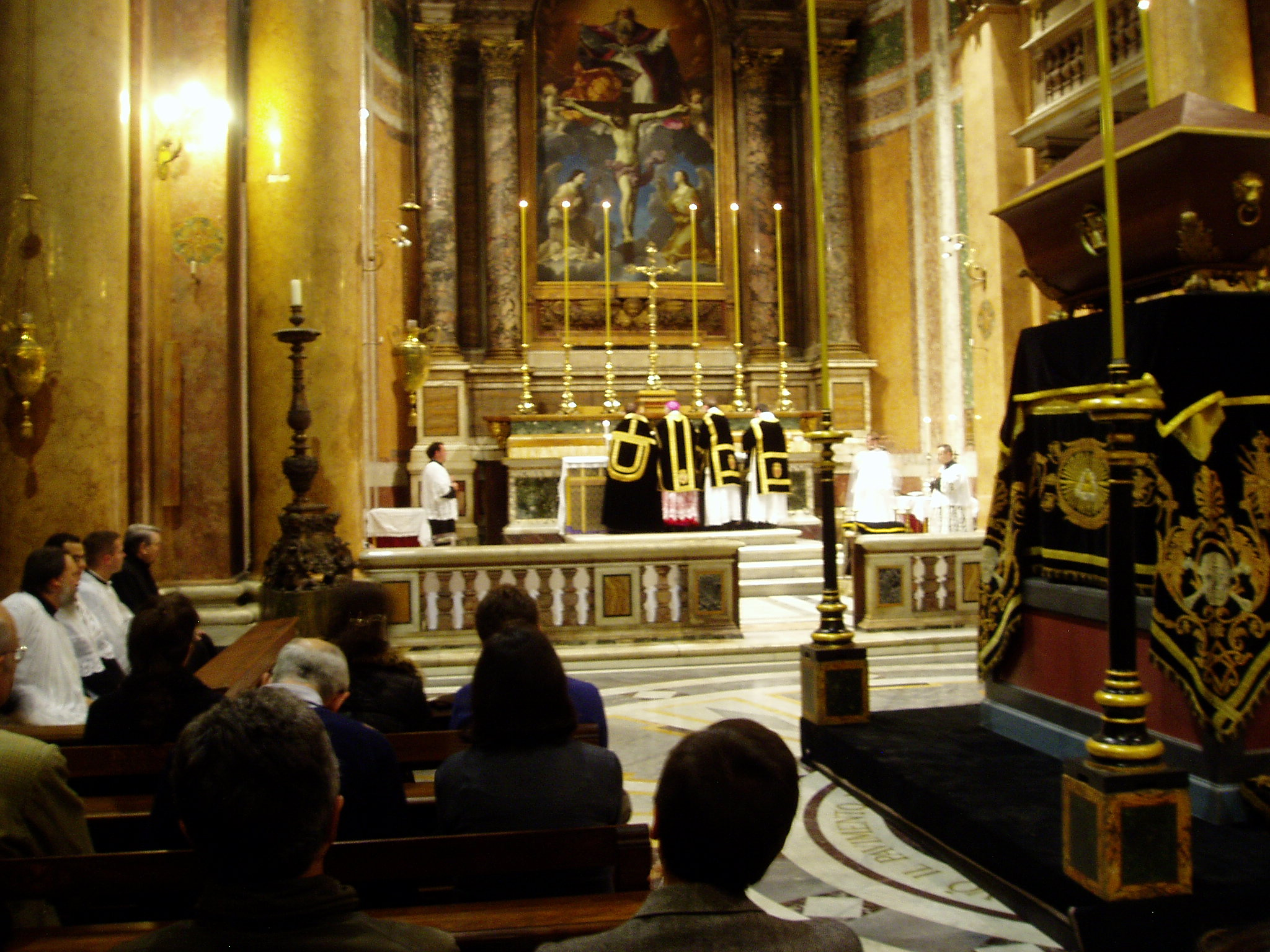
Tridentine Requiem Mass at Santissima Trinità dei Pellegrini (Most Holy Trinity of Pilgrims) church in Rome

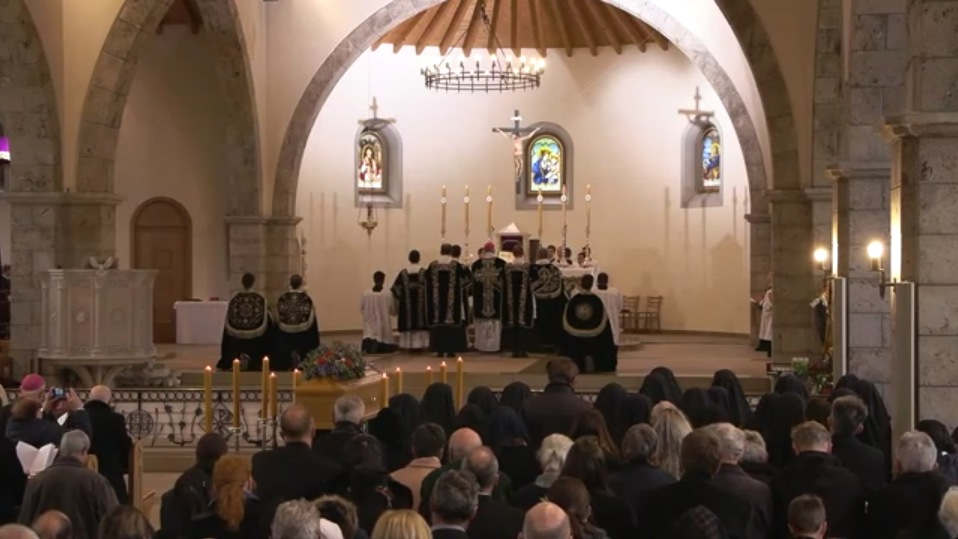
Requiem Mass for Bishop Vitus Huonder celebrated by Bishop Bernard Fellay, SSPX at International Seminary of Saint Pius X in Écône, Switzerland, 2024

In earlier forms of the Roman Rite, some of which are still in use, a Requiem Mass differs in several ways from the usual Mass. Some parts that were of relatively recent origin, including some that have been excluded in the 1970 revision of the regular Mass, are omitted. Examples are the psalm Iudica at the start of Mass, the prayer said by the priest before reading the Gospel (or the blessing of the deacon, if a deacon reads it), and the first of the two prayers of the priest for himself before receiving Communion. Other omissions include the use of incense at the Introit and the Gospel, the kiss of peace, lit candles held by acolytes when a deacon chants the Gospel, and blessings.

There is no Gloria in excelsis Deo and no recitation of the Creed; the Alleluia chant before the Gospel is replaced by a Tract, as in Lent; and the Agnus Dei is altered. Ite missa est is replaced with Requiescant in pace (May they rest in peace); the Deo gratias response is replaced with Amen; and the final blessing for the congregation is omitted. Black was the obligatory liturgical colour of the vestments in the earlier forms (including the Missal of 1962), while in the renewed liturgy "the colour black may be used, where it is the practice, in Masses for the Dead".

The sequence Dies irae, recited or sung between the Tract and the Gospel, was an obligatory part of the Requiem Mass before the changes as a result of the liturgical reform of the Second Vatican Council. As its opening words Dies irae ("Day of wrath") indicate, this poetic composition speaks of the Day of Judgment in fearsome terms; it then appeals to Jesus for mercy.

In the extraordinary form of the Roman Rite, commemorations (i.e. collect, secret, and postcommunion of either lower-ranking liturgical feasts that occur on the same day or votive/seasonal commemorations) are absent from the liturgy; as a result, it is standard practice for a separate, smaller Requiem Missal containing only the rubrics and various Mass formularies for Masses for the dead to be used, rather than the full Missal containing texts that will never be used at Requiems.

=== Roman Rite ===
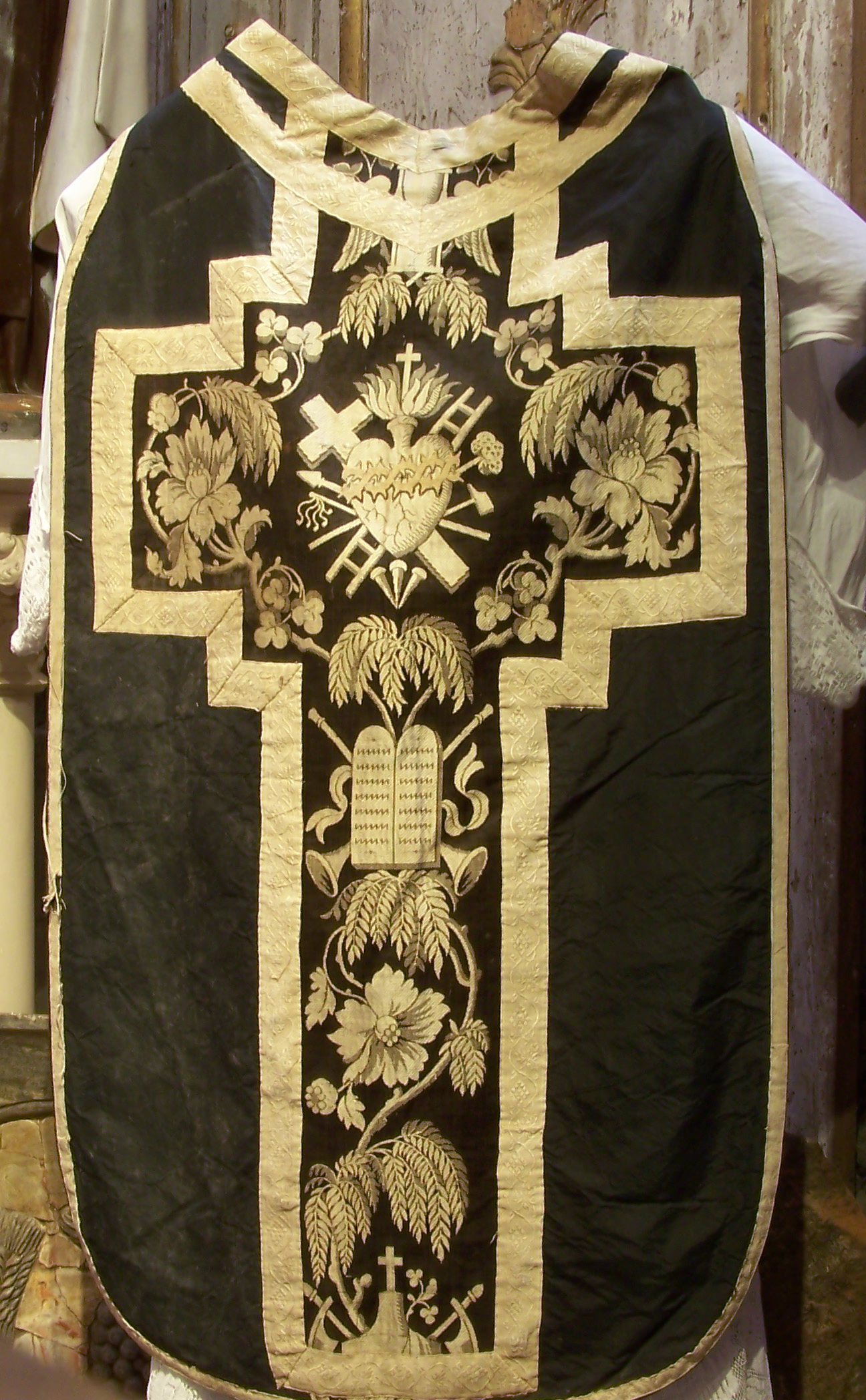
Black chasuble used in Requiem Masses

In the liturgical reforms of the mid-20th century in the Catholic Church's Roman Rite, there was a significant shift in the funeral rites used by the Church. The theme of sorrow and grief was also made to emphasise the whole community's worship of God in which the deceased is entrusted to God's mercy, based on trust in the salvation value of the Passion, Death and Resurrection of Jesus Christ.

In the 1970s, 1980s and 1990s, the Requiem Mass was sometimes termed a "Mass of the Resurrection" or Mass of Christian Burial, although the former was never official terminology. In the official English ritual, Order of Christian Funerals, published by the Bishops of England and Wales in 1990, the title is given as "Funeral Mass". "Requiem Mass" remains a suitable title for other Masses for the Dead and for the Funeral Mass itself (as the proper antiphons remain in force: Introit, "Eternal rest grant ... " / "Requiem æternam dona eis Domine"; Offertory, "Lord Jesus Christ, King of glory, deliver the souls of all the faithful departed ... " / "Domine Iesu Christe, Rex gloriæ, libera animas ..."; Communion, "Let perpetual light shine ..." / "Lux æterna luceat eis, Domine..."). In keeping with those trends of the latter 21st century, the use of white vestments was made an allowable option by the Missal, though only by an indult; black remains the normal colour of all Requiem Masses, including Funeral Masses. Violet, a colour of penance, was also allowed by indult, since penance and reparation for the soul, presumably in Purgatory, is encouraged by the Church. The texts used for the liturgy underwent a similar change, and some of the new options for the readings reinforce an overall theme of Jesus' promise of eternal life.

== Requiem in other Churches and rites ==
Requiem is also used to describe any sacred composition that sets to music religious texts which would be appropriate at a funeral, or to describe such compositions for liturgies other than the Roman Catholic Mass. Among the earliest examples of this type are the German settings composed in the 17th century by Heinrich Schütz and Michael Praetorius, whose works are Evangelical-Lutheran Requiem Masses—adaptations of the Roman Catholic requiem, and which provided inspiration for the Evangelical-Lutheran German Requiem by Brahms.

Such works include:

- Greek Orthodox Church—Parastas
- Russian Orthodox Church—Panikhida
- Anglican (English) Requiem

=== Eastern Christian rites ===
In the Eastern Orthodox, Eastern Lutheran and Greek-Catholic Churches, the requiem is the fullest form of memorial service (Greek: μνημόσυνο, Slavonic: Opelo). The normal memorial service is a greatly abbreviated form of Matins, but the Requiem contains all of the psalms, readings, and hymns normally found in the All-Night Vigil (which combines the Canonical Hours of Vespers, Matins and First Hour), providing a complete set of propers for the departed. The full requiem will last around three-and-a-half hours. In this format it more clearly represents the original concept of parastas, which means literally, "standing throughout (the night)." Often, there will be a Divine Liturgy celebrated the next morning with further propers for the departed.

Because of their great length, a full Requiem is rarely served. However, at least in the Russian liturgical tradition, a Requiem will often be served on the eve before the Glorification (canonization) of a saint, in a special service known as the "Last Panikhida".

=== Evangelical-Lutheranism ===
In the Evangelical-Lutheran Churches, the Requiem Mass celebrates Christ's victory over death.

A German Requiem, authored by Johannes Brahms, uses the Lutheran Bible for its texts.

A Requiem Mass of the Evangelical-Lutheran Societas Sanctae Birgittae at the Church of the Holy Trinity in Uppsala

Incense at an Evangelical-Lutheran Requiem Mass at the Church of the Holy Trinity in Uppsala, Sweden

A Requiem Mass of the Evangelical-Lutheran Societas Sanctae Birgittae at the Church of the Holy Trinity in Uppsala

The priest prays in the orans position during a Requiem Mass of the Church of the Holy Trinity (Evangelical-Lutheran) in Uppsala

A Requiem Mass of the Evangelical-Lutheran Societas Sanctae Birgittae at the Church of the Holy Trinity in Uppsala

The faithful pray during a Requiem Mass of the Church of the Holy Trinity (Evangelical-Lutheran) in Uppsala

The elevation during a Requiem Mass of the Church of the Holy Trinity (Evangelical-Lutheran) in Uppsala

A Requiem Mass of the Evangelical-Lutheran Societas Sanctae Birgittae at the Church of the Holy Trinity in Uppsala

=== Anglicanism ===
The Book of Common Prayer contained no Requiem Mass, but instead a service named "The Order for the Burial of the Dead". Since the liturgical reform movement, provision has been made for a Eucharist to be celebrated at a funeral in various BCPs used in the various Provinces of the Anglican Communion. Prior to these additions, Anglo-Catholics or High Church Anglicans often incorporated parts of the Roman Catholic Requiem Mass as part of a funeral service — typically passages from the Ordinary of the Mass. Within this service are several texts with rubrics stating that they should be said or sung by the priest or clerks. The first few of these texts are found at the beginning of the service, while the rest are prescribed for the burial itself. These texts are typically divided into seven, and collectively known as "funeral sentences". Composers who have set the Anglican burial service to music include William Croft, Thomas Morley, Thomas Tomkins, Orlando Gibbons and Henry Purcell. The text of these seven sentences, from the 1662 Book of Common Prayer, is as follows:

- I am the resurrection and the life, saith the Lord: he that believeth in me, though he were dead, yet shall he live: and whosoever liveth and believeth in me shall never die. (John 11:25-26)
- I know that my Redeemer liveth, and that he shall stand at the latter day upon the earth. And though after my skin worms destroy this body, yet in my flesh shall I see God: whom I shall see for myself, and mine eyes shall behold, and not another. (Job 19:25-27)
- We brought nothing into this world, and it is certain we can carry nothing out. The Lord gave, and the Lord hath taken away; blessed be the Name of the Lord. (1 Timothy 6:7 and Job 1:21)
- Man that is born of a woman hath but a short time to live, and is full of misery. He cometh up, and is cut down, like a flower; he fleeth as it were a shadow, and never continueth in one stay. (Job 14:1-2)
- In the midst of life we are in death: of whom may we seek for succour, but of thee, O Lord, who for our sins art justly displeased? Yet, O Lord God most holy, O Lord most mighty, O holy and most merciful Saviour, deliver us not into the bitter pains of eternal death. (Media vita in morte sumus)
- Thou knowest, Lord, the secrets of our hearts; shut not thy merciful ears to our prayer; but spare us, Lord most holy, O God most mighty, O holy and merciful Saviour, thou most worthy judge eternal, suffer us not, at our last hour, for any pains of death, to fall from thee.
- I heard a voice from heaven, saying unto me, Write, From henceforth blessed are the dead which die in the Lord: even so saith the Spirit: for they rest from their labours. (Revelation 14:13)

== Music ==
The Requiem Mass is notable for the large number of musical compositions that it has inspired, including settings by Mozart (though uncompleted), Verdi, Berlioz, Saint-Saëns, Brahms (from the vernacular German Lutheran Bible), Dvořák, Fauré, Duruflé, and others. Originally, such compositions were meant to be performed in liturgical service, with monophonic chant. Eventually, the dramatic character of the text began to appeal to composers to an extent that they made the requiem a genre of its own, and the compositions of composers such as Verdi are essentially concert pieces rather than liturgical works.

Many of the texts in the Requiem Mass have been set to music, including:

- Introit
- Kyrie eleison
- Gradual
- Tract
- Sequence (the Dies Irae)
- Offertory
- Sanctus
- Agnus Dei
- Communion
- Pie Jesu
- Libera Me
- In paradisum

=== History of musical compositions ===
Incipit of the Gregorian chant introit for a Requiem Mass, from the Liber Usualis

For many centuries the texts of the requiem were sung to Gregorian melodies. The Requiem by Johannes Ockeghem, written sometime in the latter half of the 15th century, is the earliest surviving polyphonic setting. There was a setting by the elder composer Dufay, possibly earlier, which is now lost: Ockeghem's may have been modelled on it. Many early compositions reflect the varied texts that were in use in different liturgies around Europe before the Council of Trent standardised texts used in liturgies. The requiem of Brumel, circa 1500, is the first to include the Dies Iræ. In the early polyphonic settings of the Requiem, there is considerable textural contrast within the compositions themselves: simple chordal or fauxbourdon-like passages are contrasted with other sections of contrapuntal complexity, such as in the Offertory of Ockeghem's Requiem.

In the 16th century, more and more composers set the Requiem Mass. In contrast to practice in setting the Mass Ordinary, many of these settings used a cantus-firmus technique, something which had become quite archaic by mid-century. In addition, these settings used less textural contrast than the early settings by Ockeghem and Brumel, although the vocal scoring was often richer, for example in the six-voice Requiem by Jean Richafort which he wrote for the death of Josquin des Prez. Other composers before 1550 include Pedro de Escobar, Antoine de Févin, Cristóbal Morales, and Pierre de La Rue; that by La Rue is probably the second oldest, after Ockeghem's.

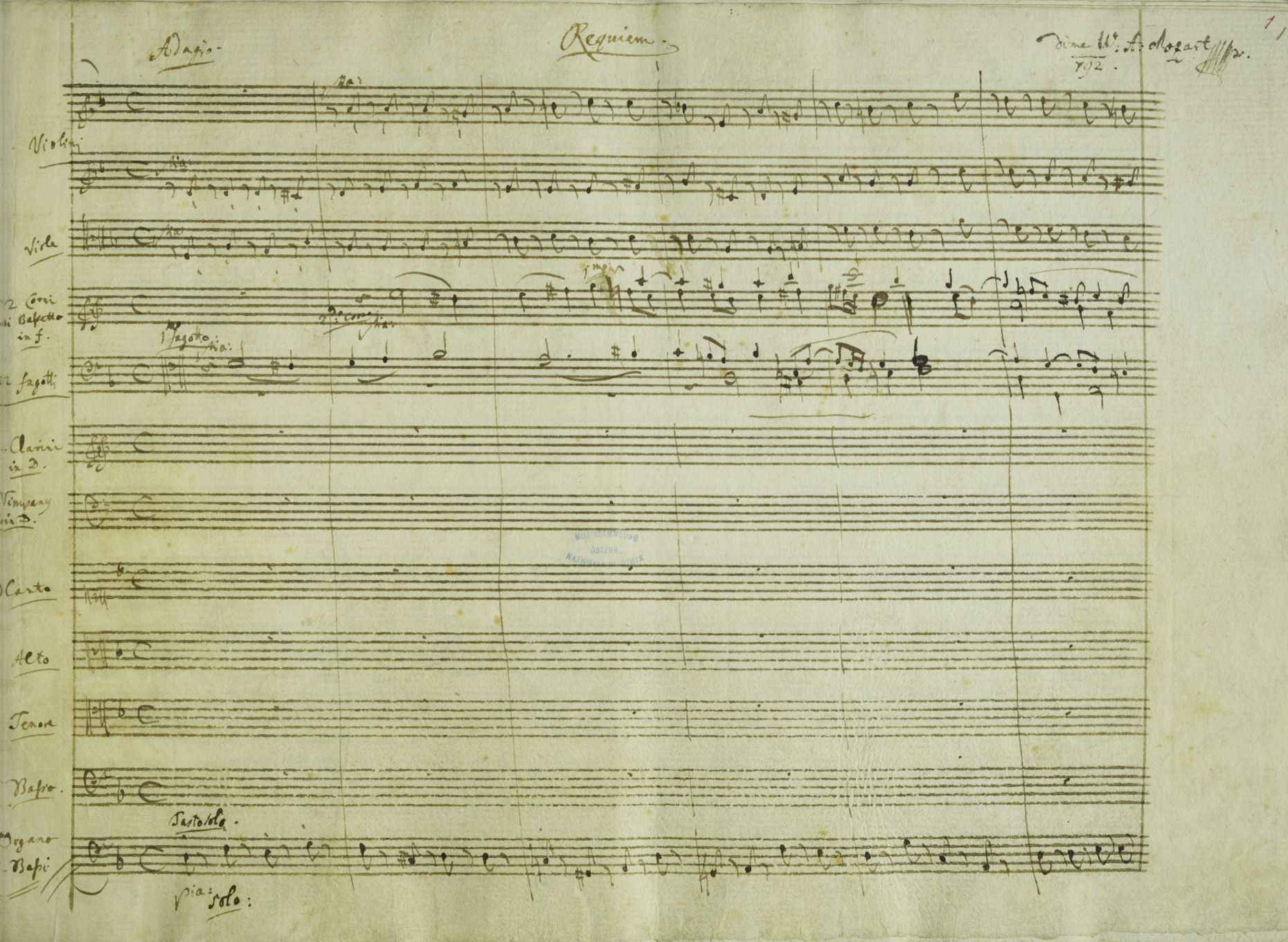
A portion of the manuscript of Mozart's Requiem, K 626 (1791), showing his heading for the first movement

Over 2,000 Requiem compositions have been composed to the present day. Typically the Renaissance settings, especially those not written on the Iberian Peninsula, may be performed a cappella (i.e. without necessary accompanying instrumental parts), whereas beginning around 1600 composers more often preferred to use instruments to accompany a choir, and also include vocal soloists. There is great variation between compositions in how much of liturgical text is set to music.

Most composers omit sections of the liturgical prescription, most frequently the Gradual and the Tract. Fauré omits the Dies iræ, while the very same text had often been set by French composers in previous centuries as a stand-alone work.

Sometimes composers divide an item of the liturgical text into two or more movements; because of the length of its text, the Dies iræ is the most frequently divided section of the text (as with Mozart, for instance). The Introit and Kyrie, being immediately adjacent in the actual Roman Catholic liturgy, are often composed as one movement.

Musico-thematic relationships among movements within a Requiem can be found as well.

==== Requiem in concert ====
Beginning in the 18th century and continuing through the 19th, many composers wrote what are effectively concert works, which by virtue of employing forces too large, or lasting such a considerable duration, prevent them being readily used in an ordinary funeral service; the requiems of Gossec, Berlioz, Verdi, and Dvořák are essentially dramatic concert oratorios. A counter-reaction to this tendency came from the Cecilian movement, which recommended restrained accompaniment for liturgical music, and frowned upon the use of operatic vocal soloists.

=== Notable compositions ===
Many composers have composed Requiems. Some of the most notable include the following (in chronological order):

- Johannes Ockeghem: Requiem (1461?)
- Antoine Brumel: Requiem
- Tomás Luis de Victoria: Officium Defunctorum (1603)
- Eustache du Caurroy: Missa pro defunctis quinque vocum (1610)
- Marc-Antoine Charpentier:
  - Messe pour les trépassés à 8, H.2
  - Dies irae H.12
  - Motet pour les trépassés à 8, H.311
  - Messe des morts à 4 voix H.7
  - Messe des morts à 4 voix et symphonie H.10 (1670–1690)
- Leopold I, Holy Roman Emperor: Requiem (1673)
- Jean Gilles: Requiem
- André Campra: Requiem
- Antonio Caldara: Requiem in E minor
- Francesco Durante: Requiem in G minor
- François Giroust: Requiem, Choeur à 5 voix 1775
- François-Joseph Gossec: Requiem (1760)
- Johann Adolph Hasse: Requiem in C major (1763), Requiem in E♭ major (1764)
- Michael Haydn: Missa pro Defunctis, Klafsky I:8, MH 155 (1771)
- Wolfgang Amadeus Mozart: Requiem, K. 626 (1791)
- Antonio Salieri: Requiem in C minor (1804)
- Luigi Cherubini: Requiem in C minor (1816), Requiem in D minor (1836)
- João Domingos Bomtempo: Requiem in C minor "À Memória de Camões", Op. 23 (1819)
- Ferdinand Schubert: Requiem in G minor, Op. 9 (1828)
- Hector Berlioz: Requiem, Op. 5 (1837)
- Anton Bruckner: Requiem, WAB 39 (1849)
- Robert Schumann: Requiem, Op. 148 (1852)
- Franz von Suppé: Requiem (1855)
- Friedrich Kiel: Requiem in F minor, Op. 20 (1861–62), Requiem in A♭ major, Op. 80 (1881)
- Peter Benoit: Requiem (1862–63)
- Peter Cornelius: Requiem (1863–72)
- Johannes Brahms: A German Requiem, Op. 45 (1865–68)
- Théodore Gouvy: Requiem in E♭ minor (1874)
- Giuseppe Verdi: Messa da Requiem (1874)
- Camille Saint-Saëns: Requiem, Op. 54 (1878)
- Antonín Dvořák: Requiem, Op. 89, B. 165 (1890)
- Gabriel Fauré: Requiem, Op. 48 (1887–90)
- Heinrich von Herzogenberg: Requiem, Op. 72 (1891)
- Charles Villiers Stanford: Requiem, Op. 63 (1896)
- Frederick Delius: Requiem (1913–16)
- Ildebrando Pizzetti: Messa di Requiem (1922–23)
- Herbert Howells: Requiem (1932)
- Bruno Maderna: Requiem (1946)
- Maurice Duruflé: Requiem, Op. 9 (1947)
- Benjamin Britten: War Requiem, Op. 66 (1961–62)
- György Ligeti: Requiem (1963–65)
- Igor Stravinsky: Requiem Canticles (1966)
- Bernd Alois Zimmermann: Requiem für einen jungen Dichter (1967–69)
- Krzysztof Penderecki: Polish Requiem (1980–2005)
- Andrew Lloyd Webber: Requiem (1985)
- John Rutter: Requiem (1985)
- Serban Nichifor: Requiem (1990)
- Hans Werner Henze: Requiem (1991–93)
- Olivier Greif: Requiem (1999)
- Christopher Rouse: Requiem (2002)
- Karl Jenkins: Requiem (2005)
- Dan Forrest: Requiem for the Living (2013)

=== Modern treatments ===
In the 20th century the requiem evolved in several new directions. The genre of War Requiem is perhaps the most notable, which comprise compositions dedicated to the memory of people killed in wartime. These often include extra-liturgical poems of a pacifist or non-liturgical nature; for example, the War Requiem of Benjamin Britten juxtaposes the Latin text with the poetry of Wilfred Owen, Krzysztof Penderecki's Polish Requiem includes a traditional Polish hymn within the sequence, and Robert Steadman's Mass in Black intersperses environmental poetry and prophecies of Nostradamus. Holocaust Requiem may be regarded as a specific subset of this type. The Requiem Ebraico (Hebrew Requiem) (1945) by Austrian-American composer Eric Zeisl, a setting of Psalm 92 dedicated to the memory of the composer's father "and the other countless victims of the Jewish tragedy in Europe", is considered the first major work of Holocaust commemoration. John Foulds's A World Requiem was written in the aftermath of the First World War and initiated the Royal British Legion's annual festival of remembrance. Recent requiem works by Taiwanese composers Tyzen Hsiao and Ko Fan-long follow in this tradition, honouring victims of the February 28 Incident and subsequent White Terror.

The 20th century saw the development of the secular Requiem, written for public performance without specific religious observance, such as Max Reger's Requiem (1915), the setting of a German poem titled Requiem and dedicated to victims of World War I, and Frederick Delius's Requiem, completed in 1916 and dedicated to "the memory of all young Artists fallen in the war"; Paul Hindemith's When Lilacs Last in the Dooryard Bloom'd: A Requiem for Those We Love, commissioned in 1945 (premiered 1946) after the passing of Franklin Delano Roosevelt, and based on Walt Whitman's elegy written after the passing of Abraham Lincoln; and Dmitry Kabalevsky's Requiem (Op. 72; 1962), a setting of a poem written by Robert Rozhdestvensky especially for the composition.

Herbert Howells's unaccompanied Requiem uses Psalm 23 ("The Lord is my shepherd"), Psalm 121 ("I will lift up mine eyes"), "Salvator mundi" ("O Saviour of the world" in English), "Requiem aeternam" (two different settings), and "I heard a voice from heaven". John Rutter combines in his Requiem (1985) some of the parts of the Latin Requiem with two complete psalms, Psalm 130 "Out of the deep" and his earlier composition The Lord is my Shepherd, and juxtaposes more biblical verses within the Latin movements.

Some composers have written purely instrumental works bearing the title of Requiem, as famously exemplified by Britten's Sinfonia da Requiem. Hans Werner Henze's Das Floß der Medusa, written in 1968 as a requiem for Che Guevara, is properly speaking an oratorio; Henze's Requiem is instrumental but retains the traditional Latin titles for the movements. Igor Stravinsky's Requiem Canticles mixes instrumental movements with segments of the "Introit", "Dies irae", "Pie Jesu" and "Libera me".

== See also ==
- Memorial
- Month's mind
