= Charles Martin Casál =

American composer

Charles Martin Casál (born 1992) is a Georgia-born composer of new music based out of New York City, and recently graduated from Fordham College at Lincoln Center.

Martin's projects include symphonic, choral, chamber, and crossover works. He prefers to work in genre-bending territory, exploring non-orchestral sounds in the concert hall and incorporating music from other cultures, including folklore from his Cuban-American family.

In 2013, he received the NYC Exponential Ensemble Young Composer Award, and joined the New York Youth Symphony later in 2013 as part of the Robert L. Post Apprentice Conducting Workshop. In 2014, he was one of 6 musicians worldwide chosen as a composition fellow at the Dulwich International Music Academy (Beijing, China), followed by a term at the European American Music Alliance (Paris, France).

His works have been performed in four countries, including NYC venues DiMenna Center, Lincoln Center, and Riverbank State Park. His teachers have included Daniel Ott, Wayne Oquin, Kyle Blaha, Milica Paranosic, Conrad Cummings, Sir Vincent La Selva, Narcís Bonet, and Thierry Lancino.
