= Requiem (Wilberg) =

Musical work for chorus, orchestra, a soprano and a baritone soloist

- Sacred vocal music by Mack Wilberg
- Text: Parts from the Requiem Mass; Bible verses
- Language: Latin; Greek; English
- Performed: 27 April 2007: Salt Lake City, UT
- Published: 2008: Oxford University Press
- Movements: 7

Mack Wilberg's Requiem is a large-scale work for chorus, orchestra, a soprano and a baritone soloist. Wilberg began composition in 2006 and it was premiered in 2007 in Salt Lake City, Utah. It comprises seven movements, which together last 34 minutes. It was published in 2008 by Oxford University Press.

The cover art of the album and the score displays the stained glass of the Chapel of Thanksgiving in Dallas, TX, created by Gabriel Loire.

== History ==
Wilberg completed Requiem in 2007. He called it a "requiem for the living." Wilberg was first inspired to write a full requiem after Craig Jessop commissioned him to write an Introit and Epilogue for a performance of Vaughan Williams’s cantata, Dona nobis pacem, at Carnegie Hall's National High School Choral Festival on March 14, 2006. Wilberg later decided to compose other movements to fill the requiem, culminating in its premiere performance on April 26, 2007 with soprano Laura Garff Lewis and baritone Tyler Oliphant as soloists. A CD recording was released the following year, with the Tabernacle Choir at Temple Square, and soloists Frederica von Stade and Bryn Terfel.

== Music ==
Wilberg scored the Requiem for mixed choir, orchestra, and a soprano and a baritone soloist. Wilberg structured the work in seven movements, similar to the setting of John Rutter. It switches between English and Latin throughout.

=== Orchestration ===
3 flutes (flute 3 doubles piccolo), 2 oboes (double 2 English horns), 2 clarinets in Bb, 2 bassoons, 4 horns in F, celeste (glockenspiel in absence of celeste), harp, piano, organ (optional), violin 1, violin 2, viola, cello, double bass

=== Table of movements ===
The following table shows the title, tempo marking, voices, time, key and text sources for the seven movements. The information is given for the beginning of the movements. Wilberg maintains triple time signatures throughout the whole work with mostly slow tempi, but he involves frequent, complex key changes from movement to movement. The source for the details is the vocal score, unless otherwise noted.

Movements of Wilberg's Requiem
No.	Title	Tempo marking	Vocal	Time	Key	Text source
1	Requiem aeternam	Slowly, with mystical expression	Chorus	3/2 =46	harmonic planing ends D major	Introit
2	Kyrie	With intensity and outcry	Chorus; Baritone	9/8.=72	polytonal, F♯ minor, A melodic minor	Kyrie & English Translation
3	I Will Lift Up Mine Eyes	With contemplation	Chorus; Baritone	3/2 =50	harmonic planing ends in B major	Psalm 121
4	How Lovely Is Thy Dwelling Place	Moderately, with motion	Soprano w/ flute solo	3/2 =76	polytonal with E♭ pentatonic minor melody	Psalm 84
5	O nata lux	Luminous	Chorus	3/2 =69	D♯ minor	An ancient Catholic text used for the Feast of the Transfiguration
6	The Lord is my shepherd	With Expression	Baritone	3/2 =72	F minor	Psalms 23
7	I am the resurrection and the life—Requiem aeternum	With expression	Chorus	3/2 =66	Multiple, ends in E major	John 11:25-26; Introit

==== 1. Requiem aeternam ====
The first movement consists of the Introit from the Requiem mass ("Requiem aeternam").

This text originates from 4 Esdras 2:34–35

Requiem æternam dona eis, Domine:
et lux perpetua luceat eis.

Eternal rest give unto them, O Lord,
and let perpetual light shine upon them.

==== 2. Kyrie ====
The second movement is entitled Kyrie. It begins with choir singing in Greek, and then transitions to Baritone soloist singing in English.

Kyrie, eleison!

Have mercy! Have mercy!
Hear my cry! Hear my cry!
Have mercy! Have mercy!
Hear my cry! Hear my cry!

Christe, eleison!

Have mercy! Have mercy!
Hear my cry! Hear my cry!
Have mercy! Have mercy!
Hear my cry! Hear my cry!

Lord, have mercy!

Christ, have mercy!

==== 3. I will lift up mine eyes ====
The third movement is I will lift up mine eyes. It is set for Baritone solo.

I will lift up mine eyes until the hills from whence cometh my help.
My help cometh even from the Lord, who made heaven and earth.
He will not suffer thy foot to be moved and he that keepeth will not sleep.
Behold, he that keepeth Isræl shall neither slumber nor sleep.
The Lord Himself is thy keeper.
The Lord is thy defense upon thy right hand
So that the sun shall not burn thee by day,
Neither the moon by night.
The Lord shall preserve thee from all evil.
Yea, it is even He that shall keep thy soul.
The Lord shall preserve thy going out
And thy coming in
From this time forth for evermore.

==== 4. How Lovely Is Thy Dwelling Place ====
The central movement is "How Lovely Is Thy Dwelling Place." It is set for Mezzo-Soprano with flute solo.

How lovely is Thy dwelling place, O Lord, O Lord of Hosts.
My soul longeth, yea, it fainteth for the courts of the Lord.
My heart and my flesh crieth out for the living God.
Yea, the sparrow hath found an house,
and the swallow a nest where she may lay her young,
Ev'n thine altars, O Lord of Hosts, my King and my God.
Blessed are they that dwell in thine house:
They are ever praising Thee.
Blessed are those whose strength is in Thee:
They go from strength to strength, appeareth before God.

==== 5. O nata lux ====
The fifth movement is "O nata lux." It is set for choir and orchestra, with harp solo.

O nata lux de lumine,
Jesu redemptor sæculi.
Dignare clemens supplicum,
laudes preces que sumere.
Qui carne quondam contegi
dignature es pro perditis
Nos membra confer effici
Tui beati corporis.

O Light born from Light
Jesus Redeemer of the world.
Lenient, look down upon our supplication,
Our prayers and praise.
Thou that wast once flesh
Look down for the sake of those who are lost.
Bring us as members of Thy happy body.

==== 6. The Lord is my shepherd ====
The sixth movement is "The Lord is my shepherd." It is set for Baritone solo. It is interesting to note that Wilberg departs from his traditional KJV translation of biblical texts.

The Lord is my shepherd; therefore can I lack nothing.
He shall feed me in a green pastures, and lead me forth beside the waters of comfort.
He shall convert my soul and bring me forth in the paths of righteousness.
Yea, though I walk through the valley of the shadow of death, I will fear no evil.
Thy rod and staff, they comfort me.
Thou shalt prepare a table before me against those that trouble me;
Thou anointed my head with oil, and my cup shall be full.
But thy loving-kindness and mercy shall follow me all the days of my life;
And I will dwell in the house of the Lord forever.

==== 7. I am the resurrection and the life—Requiem aeternum ====
The seventh movement is titled "I am the resurrection and the life—Requiem aeternum." It set for choir and orchestra, and switches from first an English text to then a Latin text. The choir first sings John 11:25-26 and then the Introit from the Requiem Mass.

I am the Resurrection and the Life, saith the Lord.
He that believeth in Me, though he were dead, yet shall he live;
And whosover liveth and believeth in me shall never die.

Requiem æternam dona eis, Domine:
et lux perpetua luceat eis.

Eternal rest give unto them, O Lord,
and let perpetual light shine upon them.
