= Françoise Pollet =

French soprano (born 1949)

Françoise Pollet (born 10 September 1949 in Boulogne Billancourt) is a French soprano. She made her debut in 1983 at the Lübeck Opera as Marschallin in the Rosenkavalier of Richard Strauss.

== Selected recordings ==
- Saint-Saëns, Requiem, Psaume XVIII, Françoise Pollet, soprano, Orchestre National d'Ile de France, Choeur Vittoria d'Ile de France, conducted by Jacques Mercier. CD ADDA 1989
- Berlioz, Les Troyens, Françoise Pollet, Didon, The Montréal Symphony Orchestra and Chorus, conducted by Charles Dutoit. 4 CD Decca 1994
- Messiaen, Poèmes pour Mi, Françoise Pollet, soprano, The Cleveland Orchestra, conducted by Pierre Boulez. CD DG 1997
