= Officium Defunctorum (Victoria) =

Musical setting of the Office of the Dead

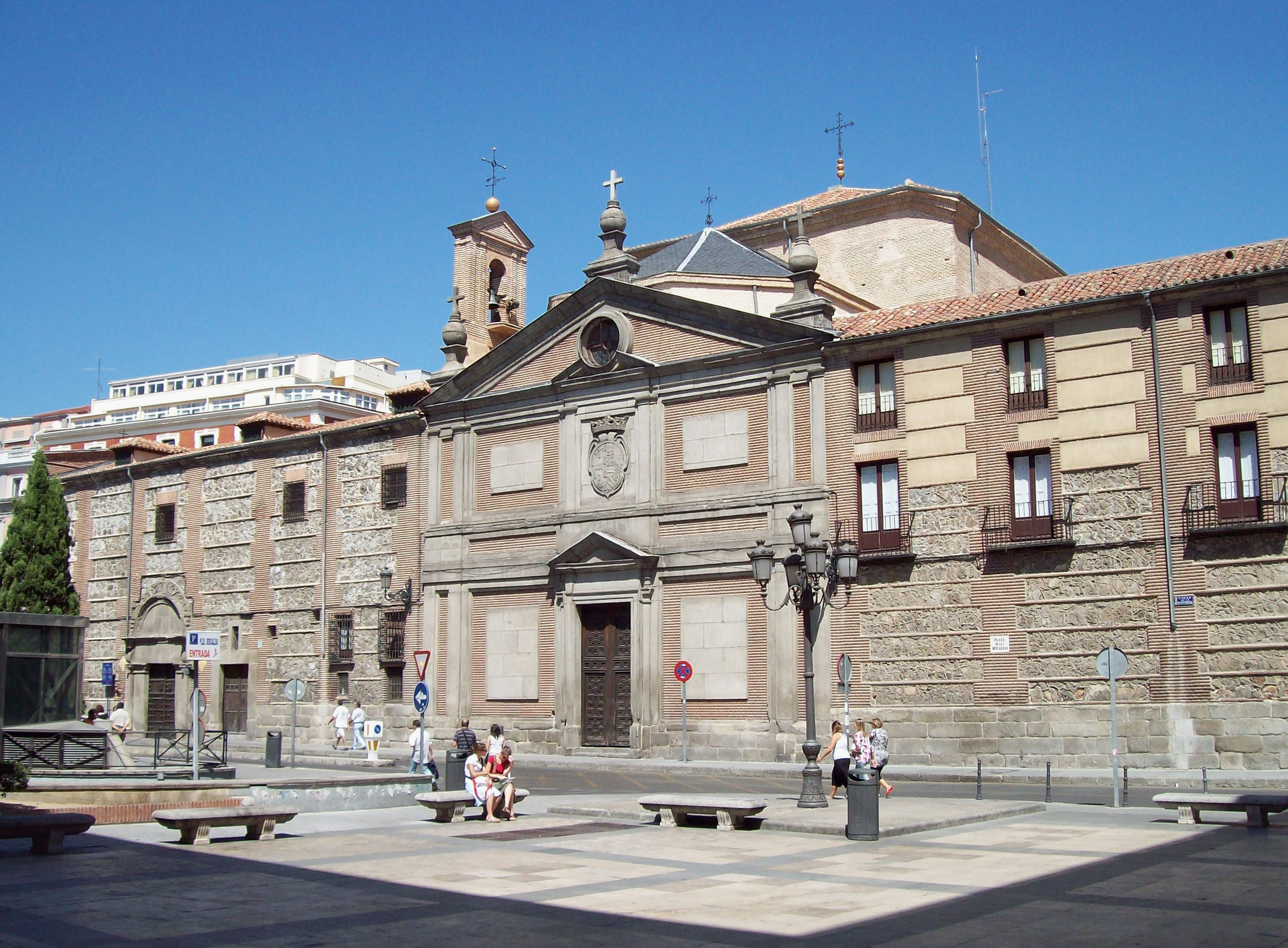
The Convent of Las Descalzas Reales, where Victoria served as chaplain and organist

The Officium defunctorum is a musical setting of the Office of the Dead composed by Tomás Luis de Victoria in 1603 for the exequies of the Dowager Empress Maria of Austria. The work was published two years later in Madrid as a standalone, commemorative edition. The Officium defunctorum, Victoria's last known composition, is widely regarded as a masterpiece numbering among the greatest musical works of the Renaissance.

Victoria had served as Maria's chaplain in the Convent of Las Descalzas Reales from 1587 until her death on 26 February 1603. Upon her death, Victoria was tasked with writing the music for her exequies, which took place on 18 and 19 March. Victoria later revised the work and had it published in 1605 as Officium Defunctorum, sex vocibus, in obitu et obsequiis Sacræ Imperatricis, dedicating the volume to Archduchess Margaret of Austria, Maria's daughter.

The Officium defunctorum of 1605 is often referred to as "Victoria's Requiem"; however, Victoria had previously written a four-voice Missa pro defunctis published in 1583, which was republished in 1592 with two additional responsories for the Office of the Dead.

== Structure ==
The Officium defunctorum is divided into four parts. The first is a Missa pro defunctis (Mass for the dead), containing every movement of the Requiem Mass except the Sequence (Dies irae) and the Tract (Absolve Domine). The second part is a setting of the text Versa est in luctum (taken from Job 30:31 and 7:16), sung as an extra-liturgical motet. The third part is the Absolution, containing the Libera me (responsory) and the Kyrie. The fourth part is a setting of Taedet animam meam (taken from Job 10:1-7), the second lesson of Matins of the Office of the Dead. Although the Matins lesson would chronologically precede the Missa pro defunctis, the original 1605 publication prints the Officium defunctorum in the following order:

- Missa pro defunctis

- Introit
- Kyrie
- Gradual
- Offertory
- Sanctus
- Agnus Dei
- Communion

- Motet

- Versa est in luctum

- Absolution

- Libera me
- Kyrie

- Second Lesson of Matins

- Taedet animam meam

The first three parts are set for six voices (SSATTB); however, the Libera me includes a three-voice SAB section (the verse Tremens factus sum ego, recycled from Victoria's 1583 Requiem) and a four-voice SSAT section (the verse Dies illa dies irae).

The movements of the Missa pro defunctis and the Absolution alternate between plainsong and polyphony with a cantus firmus throughout, carried by the Cantus II voice (except for the Offertory, in which the cantus firmus is placed in the Altus voice). The motet Versa est in luctum appears to be freely composed, although the opening is based on Luca Marenzio's Dolorosi martir. The Matins lesson Taedet animam meam is set for four voices (SATB) and is likewise freely composed.
