= Requiem (Saint-Saëns) =

1878 requiem by Saint-Saëns

Messe de Requiem
- by Camille Saint-Saëns
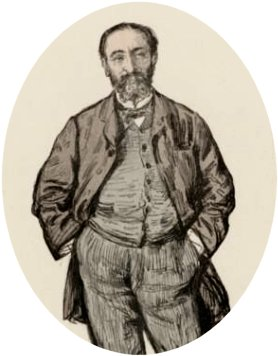
- The composer in 1875
- Opus: 54
- Occasion: In memory of Albert Libon
- Text: Requiem
- Language: Latin
- Performed: 22 May 1878
- Scoring: four soloists; choir; organs; orchestra

The Requiem, full title Messe de Requiem, Op. 54, is a Requiem Mass composed by Camille Saint-Saëns in 1878 for soloists, choir and orchestra. He composed it in memory of his friend and patron, Albert Libon (1823-1877), and conducted the first performance on 22 May 1878 at Saint-Sulpice, Paris, with Charles-Marie Widor as the organist. It was first published the same year.

== History ==
Camille Saint-Saëns composed the Requiem in memory of his friend and patron, Albert Libon, who had died in 1877. Libon had been a director of the postal service in Paris. He was interested in music and left Saint-Saëns 100,000 francs in his will which enabled the composer to retire from his church post at La Madeleine in Paris and use his time for composition. The inheritance came with the stipulation that Saint-Saëns compose a requiem for the first anniversary of his benefactor's death, which the composer fulfilled with gratitude. He retreated to a hotel in Bern and completed the work in eight days. He wrote to his publisher: "Fear not, this Requiem will be very short; I’m not just working hard, I’m working flat out!" He conducted the first performance on 22 May 1878 in the Mass commemorating the first anniversary of Libon's death at Saint-Sulpice, Paris, with Charles-Marie Widor as the organist. It was first published the same year.

In 2016, it was published in a critical edition by Carus-Verlag, in the version for orchestra as well as in a version for a smaller ensemble but retaining the characteristic sound.

== Music ==
=== Structure and scoring ===
The Requiem consists of eight movements:

1. Requiem – Kyrie
2. Dies irae
3. Rex tremendae
4. Oro supplex
5. Hostias (Offertory)
6. Sanctus
7. Benedictus
8. Agnus Dei

The Requiem is scored for SATB soloists and choir, and a large orchestra reminiscent of Berlioz: four flutes, two oboes, two English horns, four bassoons, four French horns, four harps, four trombones, grand organ, accompanying organ, and strings. The trombones are positioned with the grand organ, while the orchestra and the singers are located in the choir.

Carus-Verlag also published a version with a reduced orchestra, comprising only two flutes, two bassoons, two French horns, two harps, and one trombone, and without the accompanying organ, but retaining the oboes, English horns, grand organ and strings.

=== Background and composition ===
In the 19th century, church music was predominantly "backward-looking", due to the demands of the liturgy and a concept of music considered "proper" worship, such as the vocal polyphony of Palestrina, which the Cecilian Movement tolerated. The most popular work by Saint-Saëns is Oratorio de Noël, written in 1858, but he also composed motets and psalm settings earlier and late in life, in keeping with liturgical demands.

His Messe de Requiem is unusual, requiring a rich orchestra for heightened expressiveness. His biographer Jacques Bonnaure noted in his 2010 book: "This unjustly neglected Requiem is perhaps the most sensitive, imaginative, and perfect work by the composer, who finds here, more than ever before, a classical balance between form and expression, innovation and tradition, sophisticated compositional style and immediate effect."

== Recordings ==
The Messe de Requiem was recorded in 1972 by the Orchestre lyrique de l'ORTF and the Ensemble Choral Contrepoint with director Jean-Gabriel Gaussens. This recording was released on LP in stereo by RCA and RTF (650 002) as part of the Ars Gallica series. Soloists included: Danielle Galland, Jeannine Collard, Francis Bardot, Jacques Villisech, and organist Micheline Lagache.

The Messe de Requiem was recorded in 1989 by l'Orchestre National d'Ile de France, le Choeur régional de Vittoria d'Ile de France, Françoise Pollet, soprano, conducted by Jacques Mercier. CD ADDA

The Messe de Requiem was recorded, among other choral works by Saint-Saëns, by the Orchestra della Svizzera Italiana and its choir, conducted by Diego Fasolis, with soloists Marie-Paule Dotti, Guillemette Laurens, Luca Lombardo and Nicolas Testé (2004).

It was recorded in 2010, by soprano Clémentine Decouture and Le madrigal de Paris, conducted by Pierre Calmenet. CD Bayard Musique 2010.
