= Guan Xia =

Chinese composer (born 1957)

- Born: June 30, 1957 (age 67)
- Era: Contemporary

Guan Xia (simplified Chinese: 关峡; traditional Chinese: 關峽; pinyin: Guān Xiá) (born June 30, 1957) is a Chinese composer of contemporary classical music.

Guan was born in Kaifeng, and graduated from the China Central Conservatory in 1985. He has been the director of the China National Symphony Orchestra until 2018 and involved in a number of Chinese national committees working with musicians. His important works include the operas Sorrowful Dawn and Mulan Psalm, several symphonies, Earth Requiem, a piano concerto, and the Symphonic Overture No. 1 (also known as Symphonic Ballade‘Sorrowful Dawn’), which is very popular in the concerts in China. He is also famous for composing TV series soundtracks, some of which were orchestrated as concert pieces, including I Love My Family, Fortress Besieged, Little Dragonboy, The Years of Intense Emotion, and Soldiers Sortie.
