= An American Requiem =

An American Requiem is a choral work by composer James DeMars.

Following the 1992 Los Angeles riots subsequent to the Rodney King trial, Dr. James DeMars, a professor of Music Composition at Arizona State University, was commissioned by the Art Renaissance Foundation to write a large memorial work that would contribute to bringing the American community together.

The 75-minute choral work, entitled An American Requiem, was composed slowly over a full year, calling for modest musical forces: a 42-member symphony orchestra, a choir of at least 100 voices and the four vocal soloists: soprano, mezzo-soprano, tenor and bass. The Foundation dedicated the requiem to "all Americans who dedicated their lives to building this great nation."

A first performance took place on November 22, 1993 at Saint Mary Basilica in Phoenix, Arizona commemorating the 30th anniversary of the assassination of President John F. Kennedy. During the piece’s composition, it received a “dedication” from President Bill Clinton, in a letter dated September 16, 1993.

The work’s official premiere was held on MLK Day at Symphony Hall in Phoenix on January 14, 1994.

In 2002, An American Requiem returned to Phoenix Symphony Hall for the first anniversary of the September 11 attacks, with the participation of the full Phoenix Symphony Orchestra, four community choirs and mezzo-soprano Isola Jones and tenor Robert Breault.
