= Requiem (Berlioz) =

1837 musical work by Hector Berlioz

Grande Messe des morts
- Requiem by Hector Berlioz
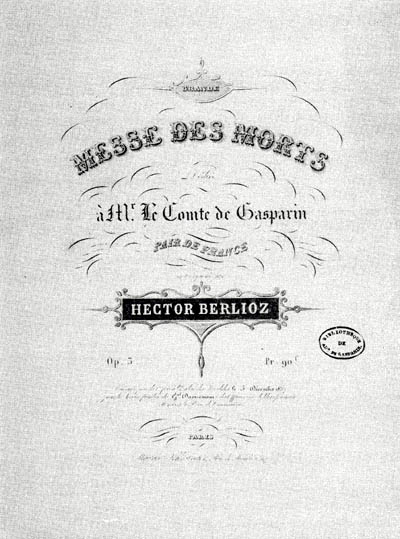
- Title page of the first edition
- Opus: 5
- Occasion: memorial of soldiers who died in the 1830 July Revolution
- Text: Requiem
- Language: Latin
- Performed: 5 November 1837
- Published: 1838, Paris
- Movements: ten
- Scoring: tenor; chorus; orchestra; four brass ensembles

The Grande Messe des morts lit. 'Grand Mass for the Dead' (or Requiem), Op. 5, by Hector Berlioz was composed in 1837. The Grande Messe des morts is one of Berlioz's best-known works, with a tremendous orchestration of woodwind and brass instruments, including four antiphonal off-stage brass ensembles. The work derives its text from the traditional Latin Requiem Mass. It has a duration of approximately ninety minutes, although there are faster recordings of under seventy-five minutes.

== History ==
In 1837, Adrien de Gasparin, the Minister of the Interior of France, asked Berlioz to compose a Requiem Mass to remember soldiers who died in the Revolution of July 1830, to be performed on the anniversary of Marshal Édouard Mortier's death in Fieschi's assassination attempt on Louis Phillippe in 1835. Berlioz accepted the request, having already wanted to compose a large orchestral work. Meanwhile, the orchestra was growing in size and quality, and the use of woodwinds and brass was expanding due to the increasing ease of intonation afforded by modern instruments. Berlioz later wrote, "if I were threatened with the destruction of the whole of my works save one, I should crave mercy for the Messe des morts."

After the originally planned performance was cancelled, a ceremony commemorating the death of General Damrémont and the soldiers killed at the Siege of Constantine provided the occasion for the premiere at Les Invalides, conducted by François Habeneck on 5 December 1837.

In his Mémoires, Berlioz claimed that at the premiere of the work, conductor François Habeneck put down his baton during the dramatic "Tuba mirum" (part of the "Dies irae" movement) while he took a pinch of snuff, prompting the composer to rush to the podium to conduct the rest of the work himself, thereby saving the performance from disaster. The premiere was a complete success.

Berlioz revised the work twice in his life, first in 1852, making the final revisions in 1867, only two years before his death.

== Structure ==
Berlioz's Requiem has ten movements, and the structure is as follows:

Introit
1. Requiem aeternam & Kyrie: Introitus
Sequence
2. Dies irae: Prosa, Tuba mirum
3. Quid sum miser
4. Rex tremendae
5. Quaerens me
6. Lacrimosa
Offertory
7. Domine Jesu Christe
8. Hostias
9. Sanctus
10. Agnus Dei

== Instrumentation ==
The Requiem is scored for a very large orchestra, including four brass choirs at the corners of the stage, and chorus:

Woodwinds
4 flutes
2 oboes
2 cors anglais
4 clarinets in B♭
8 bassoons

Brass
12 horns (4 parts + 2 extra in Mvt 2, in D, E, A, and C)
4 cornets in B♭
4 tubas

Percussion
16 timpani (6 pairs, 4 single)
2 bass drums
10 pairs of cymbals
4 tam-tams

4 brass choirs
Orchestra 1 to the North

4 cornets
4 trombones
2 tubas

Orchestra 2 to the East

4 trumpets (in E)
4 trombones

Orchestra 3 to the West

4 trumpets (in D)
4 trombones

Orchestra 4 to the South

4 trumpets (in C)
4 trombones
4 ophicleides (usually substituted by tubas)

Voices
Chorus:

80 sopranos and altos (exact ratio not specified)
60 tenors
70 basses

Tenor solo

Strings
25 violin I
25 violin II
20 violas
20 violoncellos
18 double basses

In relation to the number of singers and strings, Berlioz indicates in the score that, "The number [of performers] indicated is only relative. If space permits, the chorus may be doubled or tripled, and the orchestra be proportionally increased. But in the event of an exceptionally large chorus, say 700 to 800 voices, the entire chorus should only be used for the "Dies irae", the "Tuba mirum", and the "Lacrimosa", the rest of the movements being restricted to 400 voices."

The work premiered with over four hundred performers.

== Music ==
The Requiem opens with rising scales in the strings, horns, oboes, and cors anglais preceding the choral entry. The first movement contains the first two sections of the music for the Mass (the Introit and the Kyrie).

The Sequence commences in the second movement, with the "Dies irae" portraying Judgement Day. There are three choral sections each followed by a modulation to the next section. Following the third modulation, the four brass ensembles, specified by Berlioz to be placed at the corners of the stage but more commonly deployed throughout the hall, first appear with a fortissimo E♭ major chord, later joined by 16 timpani, two bass drums, and four tam-tams. The loud flourish is followed by the choral entry, "Tuba mirum", a powerful unison statement by the chorus basses at the top of their register, followed by the rest of the choir. There is a recapitulation of the fanfare, heralding the coming of the Last Judgment ("Judex ergo") by the full choir in canon at the octave. The choir whispers with woodwinds and strings to end the movement.

The third movement, "Quid sum miser", is short, depicting after Judgement Day, featuring an orchestration of TTB chorus, two cors anglais, eight bassoons, cellos, and double basses. The "Rex tremendae" features the second entry of the brass choirs, and contains contrasting dynamics from the choir. "Quaerens me" is a quiet a cappella movement.

The sixth movement, "Lacrimosa", is in 9/8 time signature, concluding the Sequence section of the Mass, is the only movement written in recognizable sonata form. The dramatic effect of this movement is heightened by the gradual addition of the massed brass and percussion.

The seventh movement begins the Offertory. "Domine Jesu Christe" opens as a quiet orchestral fugue based on a quasi-modal motif in D minor. The fugue is overlaid with a repeated three-note motif: A, B♭, and A from the choir, pleading for mercy at the judgment. The choral statements of this motive interweave with the developing orchestral texture for about ten minutes almost to the end, which concludes peacefully. The concluding part of the Offertory, the "Hostias", is short and scored for the male voices, eight trombones, three flutes, and strings.

The ninth movement, the "Sanctus", in D♭ major, employs a solo tenor voice accompanied by long held notes from the flute and muted strings. Hushed women's voices echo the solo lines. A brisk fugue for full choir and orchestra ("Hosanna in excelsis") follows. The whole is repeated with the addition of pianissimo cymbal and bass drum to the "Sanctus" and a much expanded "Hosanna" fugue. Berlioz suggested that the solo part could be sung by ten tenors. The final movement, containing the "Agnus Dei" and Communion sections of the Mass, features long held chords by the woodwinds and strings. The movement recapitulates melodies and effects from previous movements including the "Hostias" and the "Introit".

== Notable recordings ==
Conductor	Orchestra and choir	Tenor	Recorded at	Date
Jean Fournet	Radio Paris and the Émile Passani Choir	Georges Jouatte	Saint-Eustache, Paris	September 1943
Dimitri Mitropoulos	Vienna Philharmonic and Vienna State Opera Chorus	Léopold Simoneau	Felsenreitschule, Salzburg Festival	15 August 1956
Dimitri Mitropoulos	Cologne Radio Symphony Orchestra and Chorus, Norddeutscher Rundfunk Chorus	Nicolai Gedda	Cologne Funkhaus	26 August 1956
Hermann Scherchen	Chœurs de la RTF et Orchestre du Théâtre national de l'Opéra de Paris	Jean Giraudeau	Saint-Louis des Invalides, Paris	April 1958
Charles Munch	Boston Symphony Orchestra, New England Conservatory Chorus	Léopold Simoneau	Symphony Hall, Boston	26 & 27 April 1959
Thomas Beecham	Royal Philharmonic Orchestra, Royal Philharmonic Chorus	Richard Lewis		December 1959
Eugene Ormandy	Philadelphia Orchestra, Temple University Choir	Cesare Valletti	Philadelphia	April 1964
Charles Munch	Bavarian Radio Symphony Orchestra, Bavarian Radio Choir	Peter Schreier	Herkulessaal, Munich	July 1967
Colin Davis	London Symphony Orchestra, London Symphony Chorus	Ronald Dowd	Westminster Cathedral, London	November 1969
Leonard Bernstein	Orchestre National de France and the Choeurs de Radio France	Stuart Burrows	Saint-Louis des Invalides, Paris	September 1975
Daniel Barenboim	Orchestre de Paris and the Choeur de l'Orchestre de Paris	Placido Domingo	Maison de la Mutualité, Paris	July 1979
André Previn	London Philharmonic Choir, London Philharmonic Orchestra	Robert Tear		April 1980
Robert Shaw	Atlanta Symphony Orchestra and Chorus	John Aler	Atlanta Symphony Hall	November 10–12, 1984
Eliahu Inbal	Frankfurt Radio Symphony, NDR Chor, Konzertvereinigung ORF-Chor	Keith Lewis	Alte Oper	1988
James Levine	Berlin Philharmonic, Ernst Senff Chor	Luciano Pavarotti	Jesus-Christus-Kirche, Berlin	June 1989
Seiji Ozawa	Boston Symphony Orchestra, Tanglewood Festival Chorus	Vinson Cole	Symphony Hall, Boston	October 23, 1993
Charles Dutoit	Chœur de L'Orchestre Symphonique de Montréal, Orchestre Symphonique de Montréal	John Mark Ainsley	Saint Jérome, Montreal	28-30 May, 1997
Paul McCreesh	Wroclaw Philharmonic Orchestra, Wroclaw Philharmonic Choir, Gabrieli Players and Consort	Robert Murray	St. Mary Magdalene Church, Wrocław	September 2010
Colin Davis	London Symphony Orchestra, London Symphony Chorus, London Philharmonic Choir	Barry Banks	St Paul's Cathedral	June 2012
John Nelson	Philharmonia Orchestra, Philharmonia Chorus, London Philharmonic Chorus	Michael Spyres	St Paul's Cathedral	2019

== In popular culture ==
American stop-motion animator Phil Tippett used a two-minute excerpt from the "Tuba mirum" (from Charles Munch's recording with the Boston Symphony Orchestra) in the opening of his 2021 film Mad God.

== Sources ==
- Steinberg, Michael. "Hector Berlioz: Requiem." Choral Masterworks: A Listener's Guide. Oxford: Oxford University Press, 2005, 61–67.
