= Jean Richafort =

Jean Richafort (c. 1480 – c. 1547) was a Netherlandish composer of the Renaissance, a member of the third generation of the Franco-Flemish School.

He was probably born in Hainaut, and his native language appears to have been French. According to the poet Ronsard, Richafort studied with Josquin des Prez, an association further borne out by the fact that he composed a requiem "in memoriam Josquin Desprez". Richafort served as choir master at St. Rumbold's Cathedral in Mechelen between 1507 and 1509, and at St. Giles' church in Bruges between 1542 and 1547—leaving a huge gap in the record of his activity. At some time between these dates he was associated with the French royal chapel, since some of his music is for official occasions connected with Louis XII, and there is some evidence he may have been in Brussels in 1531 in the service of Queen Mary of Hungary, who was regent there.

Musically, Richafort was a representative of the first generation after Josquin, and he followed his style in many ways. In some of his music he used fragments of Josquin's compositions as a tribute. Richafort's compositional techniques are typical of the period (smooth polyphony, pervasive imitation, etc.) but he was unusually attentive to the clear setting of text so the words could be understood.

He wrote a requiem for six voices (Requiem in memoriam Josquin des Prez, 1532), masses, motets, settings of the Magnificat, two secular motets, and chansons.

== References and further reading ==
- Article "Jean Richafort," in The New Grove Dictionary of Music and Musicians, ed. Stanley Sadie. 20 vol. London, Macmillan Publishers Ltd., 1980. ISBN 1-56159-174-2
- Gustave Reese, Music in the Renaissance. New York, W.W. Norton & Co., 1954. ISBN 0-393-09530-4

== Recordings ==
- Christus resurgens, motet (with the mass by Adrian Willaert based on it), CD Naxos 8.553211
- Requiem [in memoriam Josquin Desprez], performed by the Huelgas Ensemble, CD Harmonia Mundi HMC 901730 (reissue HMA 1951730)
- Missa Pro Defunctis, performed by Cinquecento, CD Hyperion CDA67959
- Requiem. Tributes to Josquin Desprez, performed by the King's Singers, CD Signum SIG 326.
