= Jamie Brown (composer) =

British classical composer

Jamie Brown (born 1980) is a British classical composer who studied with Judith Weir in London. He is also a professional linguist and has previously lived in Belo Horizonte, Brazil. Musically, he is predominantly interested in vocal music, particularly for the stage, and influences range from Judith Weir and Benjamin Britten to Björk, Sigur Rós and folk music from around the world.

Jamie set up The Language and Music Partnership in 2015 - a group of young professional linguists, writers and musicians with cross-disciplinary interests who initiate, create and produce projects combining both fields. The role of musical projects in the promotion and regeneration of endangered languages is a particular interest, and A Cornish Requiem (composed by Jamie Brown, with a specially commissioned poem by Cornish poet Pol Hodge) is their first large-scale event on this theme.

Major works include:

Dearly Beheaded - a 1-act chamber opera based on the lives of Henry VIII and his six wives, for baritone, 3 sopranos, 3 mezzo-sopranos, 2 actors and ensemble (alto flute, string sextet, harp, celesta, percussion)

libretto by John Greening and contemporary accounts of what the wives themselves said

commissioned and premiered by MusicTheatreNow!, Sheffield, 2004

The Grand High Witch's Speech to the Society of English Witches - for soprano and ensemble (flute, alto flute, clarinet in Bb, bass clarinet, piano, string trio)

text by Roald Dahl

premiered by Dame Joan Rodgers and the Taliesin Ensemble, Kings Place, London, 2008

Meadows of Gold - a cantata for narrator, solo mezzo-soprano, SATB choir, oboe and string orchestra

based on the writings of 10th century Iraqi geographer Al-Masudi

premiered at St. John's Smith Square, 2009

A Cornish Requiem / Requiem Kernewek for solo baritone, SATB choir, community choir, brass quintet, drum and organ

text: sections of the Latin Requiem mass and the newly commissioned poem 'Mernans ha Remembrans' by Rol Hodge

commissioned by The Voices of London Festival and due to be premiered at St. James' Church, Sussex Gardens, 2015
