= Requiem (Dvořák) =

Funeral mass composed in 1890 by Antonín Dvořák

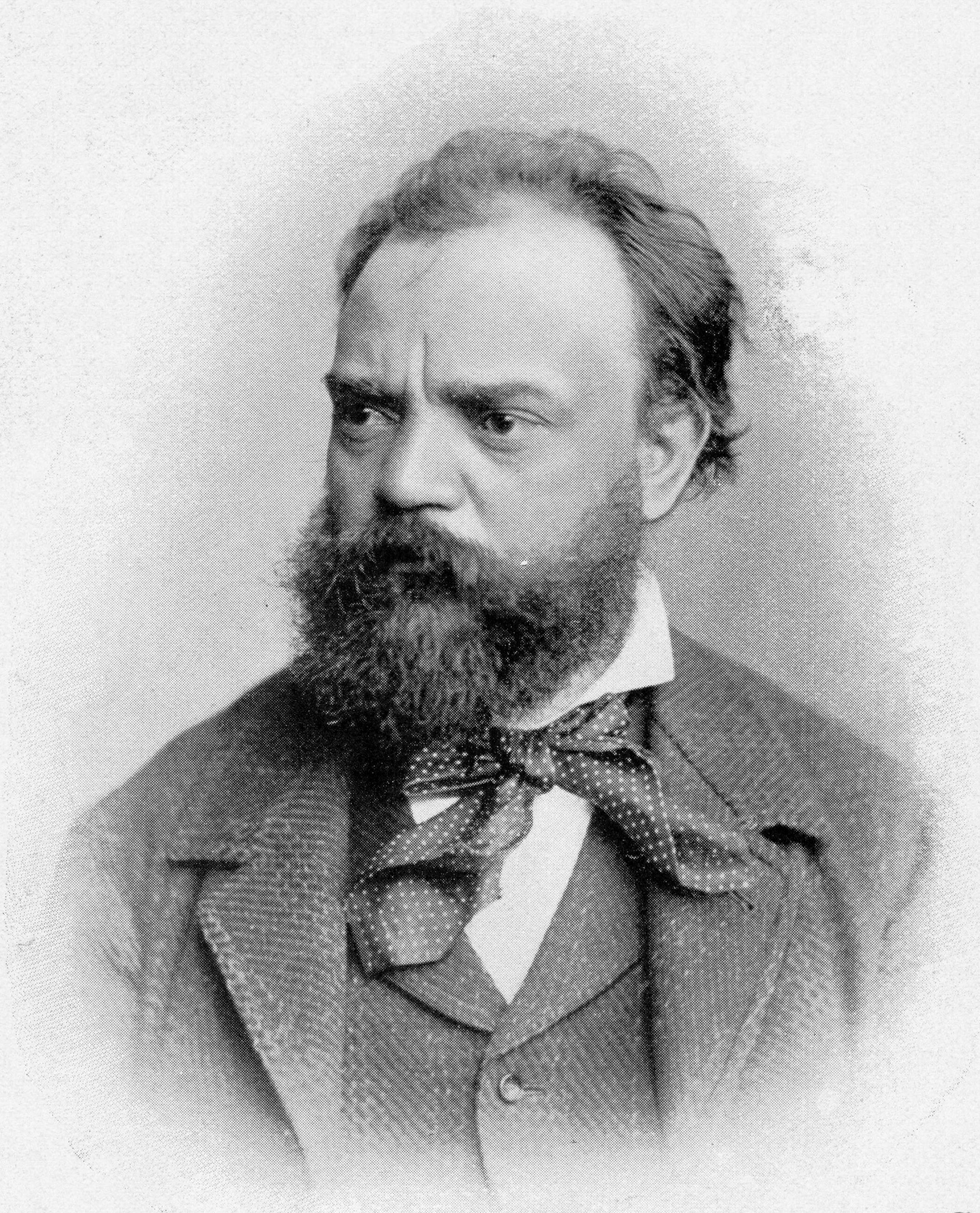
Antonín Dvořák in 1882

Antonín Dvořák's Requiem in B♭ minor, Op. 89, B. 165, is a funeral Mass scored for soloists, choir and orchestra. It was composed in 1890 and performed for the first time on 9 October 1891, in Birmingham, England, with the composer conducting.

== Structure ==
=== Part I ===
1. Introitus: Requiem aeternam. Poco lento
2. Graduale: Requiem aeternam. Andante
3. Sequentia: Dies irae. Allegro impetuoso
4. Tuba mirum. Moderato
5. Quid sum miser. Lento
6. Recordare, Jesu pie. Andante
7. Confutatis maledictis. Moderato maestoso
8. Lacrimosa. L'istesso tempo

=== Part II ===
9. Offertorium: Domine Jesu Christe. Andante con moto
10. Hostias. Andante
11. Sanctus. Andante maestoso
12. Pie Jesu. Poco adagio
13. Agnus Dei. Lento

The approximate duration of the work is 95 minutes (1 hour and 35 minutes).

== Orchestration ==
The work is scored for:

Voices:

soprano solo
alto solo
tenor solo
bass solo
SATB choir

Woodwinds:

piccolo
2 flutes
2 oboes
cor anglais
2 clarinets
bass clarinet
2 bassoons
contrabassoon

Brass:

4 horns
4 trumpets
3 trombones (alto, tenor and bass)
tuba

organ

Percussion:

timpani
tam-tam
campane (not in the original score)

Strings:

harp (Offertorium and Hostias only)
violins I, II
violas
cellos
double basses

== Selected recordings ==
- Antonín Dvořák: Rekviem – Czech Philharmonic, Czech Philharmonic Chorus, conducted by Karel Ančerl, chorus master Markéta Kühnová; soloists: Maria Stader – soprano, Sieglinde Wagner – alt, Ernst Haefliger – tenor, Kim Borg – bass. Supraphon, 1959, re-edition on 2 CD 1991 (Ančerl Gold Edition no.13). This recording was awarded the "Grand Prix du disque de l´Académie Charles Cros".
- Dvořák: Requiem for soloists, chorus and orchestra, Op. 89 – Czech Philharmonic, Kühn's mixed choir, conductor Wolfgang Sawallisch; soloists: Gabriela Beňačková, Brigitte Fassbaender, Thomas Moser, Jan-Hendrik Rootering.
- Dvořák: Requiem b-moll, Op. 89 – London Symphony Orchestra, conductor István Kertesz, Ambrosian Singers choir, soloists: Pilar Lorengar, Erzsébet Komlóssy, Róbert Ilosfalvy, Tom Krause; published by Decca.
- Dvořák: Requiem, Op. 89, New Jersey Symphony, conductor Zdeněk Mácal, Westminster Choir, soloists: Oksana Krovytska (soprano), Wendy Hoffman (mezzo-soprano), John Aler (tenor), Gustav Beláček (bass). 1999 Delos.
- Dvořák: Requiem, Op. 89, Capella Weilburgensis, conductor Doris Hagel, Kantorei der Schlosskirche Weilburg, soloists: Mechthild Bach (soprano), Stefanie Irányi (mezzo-soprano), Markus Schäfer (tenor), Klaus Mertens (bass). 2006 Profil – Edition Günter Hänssler.
- Dvořák, Requiem, Symphony No. 8' Royal Concertgebouw Orchestra, conductor Mariss Jansons, Wiener Singverein, soloists: Krassimira Stoyanova (soprano), Mihoko Fujimura (mezzo-soprano), Klaus Florian Vogt (tenor), Thomas Quasthoff (bass). 2010 RCO Live.
- Dvořák: Requiem, Op. 89, Warsaw National Philharmonic Orchestra and Chorus, conductor Antoni Wit, soloists: Christiane Libor (soprano), Ewa Wolak (alto), Daniel Kirch (tenor), Janusz Monarcha (bass). 2014 Naxos Records.
- Antonín Dvořák: Requiem – Royal Flemish Philharmonic, Collegium Vocale Gent, conductor Philippe Herreweghe; soloists: Ilse Eerens (soprano), Bernarda Fink (mezzo-soprano), Maximilian Schmitt (tenor), Nathan Berg (bass). 2015 PHI, Outhere.
- Dvořák: Requiem, Biblical Songs, Te Deum – Czech Philharmonic, Prague Philharmonic Choir, conductor Jakub Hrůša, conductor Jiří Bělohlávek, soloists: Ailyn Pérez (soprano), Christianne Stotijn (mezzo-soprano), Michael Spyres (tenor), Svatopluk Sem (baritone). 2020 Decca Records.
