= Requiem (Henze) =

Series of concertos by Hans Werner Henze

- Nine Sacred Concertos for Piano Solo, Trumpet Concertante and large Chamber Orchestra
- by Hans Werner Henze
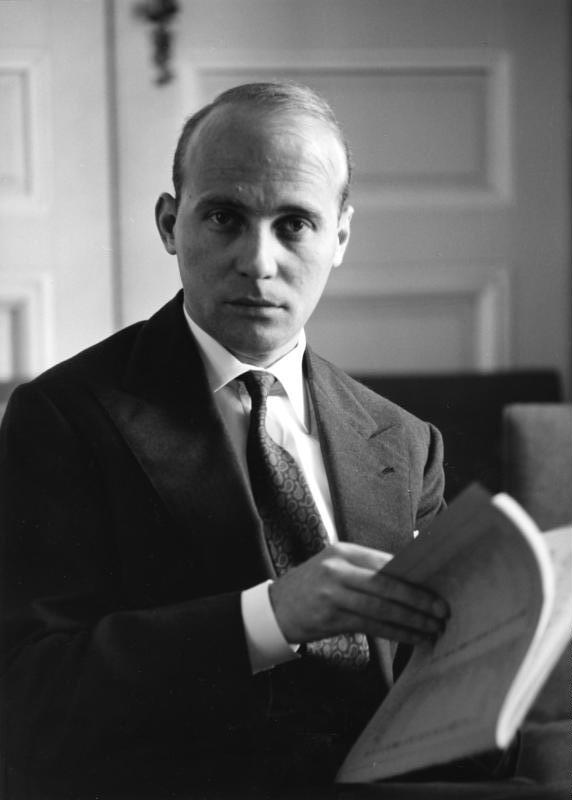
- The composer in 1960
- Based on: Requiem mass
- Dedication: in memoriam Michael Vyner
- Performed: 6 May 1990: London (Part 1)
- Published: Schott Music
- Movements: 9

Hans Werner Henze composed the nine Sacred Concertos that comprise his Requiem over the course of three years from 1991 to 1993 on commissions from the London Sinfonietta, Suntory Corporation for the NHK Philharmonic, and Westdeutscher Rundfunk, Cologne.

The first movement, Introitus: Requiem Aeternam was commissioned by the London Sinfonietta as part of a memorial concert for Artistic Director Michael Vyner who died on 20 October 1989. In addition to Henze, the London Sinfonietta also commissioned seven other prominent composers (Luciano Berio, Sir Harrison Birtwistle, Sir Peter Maxwell Davies, Toru Takemitsu, Oliver Knussen, and Nigel Osborne) to write works in Vyner's memory to make up the program which was performed on the 6 May 1990.

== Structure ==
The Requiem consists of nine Sacred Concertos that, with one exception, carry the common movement titles of the requiem mass, albeit out of order. Henze also chooses to interpolate the Ave verum corpus in with the other movements, though in his autobiography Bohemian Fifths he never expressly states why. Even though the movements carry the traditional titles, there are no singers, and no text within the work. In his autobiography, Henze states that this choice was made to open up the scope of the Requiem and make it a "...secular, multicultural piece, an act of brotherly love that was written, 'in memoriam Michael Vyner,'whose name does duty for all the many other people in the world who have died before their time and whose sufferings and passing are mourned in my music."(471)

The nine movements are listed in the following order, although it was officially stated that "[t]he movements can also be played in any desired combination."

1. Introitus
2. Dies irae
3. Ave verum corpus
4. Lux aeterna
5. Rex tremendae
6. Agnus Dei
7. Tuba mirum
8. Lacrimosa
9. Sanctus

=== Instrumentation ===
- Trumpet Concertante in C
- Piano Solo
- 2 Flutes (doubling piccolo and alto flute)
- 1 Oboe
- 1 English Horn
- 1 B♭ Clarinet (Doubling E♭)
- 1 B♭ Bass Clarinet (Doubling B♭ Contrabass Clarinet)
- 1 Soprano Saxophone (Doubling E♭ Alto and E♭ Baritone Sax)
- 1 Bassoon
- 2 Horns in F
- 2 Trumpets in C
- 2 Bass Trumpets in C (Tuba Mirum only)
- 1 Tenor Trombone
- 1 Bass Trombone (Doubling Contrabass Trombone)
- Timpani
- Harp
- Celesta
- 4 Violins
- 3 Violas
- 3 Cellos
- 1 Double Bass
- Percussion (3 Players):
  - Triangle
  - 3 Suspended Cymbals
  - Cymbals (pair)
  - 3 Tamtams
  - Thunder Sheet
  - Woodblock
  - Temple Blocks
  - Tambourine
  - Snare Drum
  - 3 Tomtoms
  - String Drum
  - Bass Drum with Cymbal
  - Matraca

== History ==
=== First complete performance ===
February 24, 1993, Philharmonic Hall, Cologne Ensemble Modern

=== First performances of individual movements ===
- Introitus: May 6, 1990, Royal Opera House, Covent Garden, London Sinfonietta
- Dies Irae: December 11, 1991, Queen Elizabeth Hall, London, London Sinfonietta
- Ave Verum Corpus: Premiered with Dies Irae and Lux Aeterna
- Lux Aeterna: Premiered with Dies Irae and Ave Verum Corpus
- Rex Tremendae: November 26, 1992, Suntory Hall, Tokyo, NHK Symphony Orchestra
- Agnus Dei: January 14, 1991, BBC Henze Festival, Barbican Centre, London, Parnassus Ensemble
- Tuba Mirum: February 24, 1993, Philharmonic Hall, Cologne, Ensemble Modern
- Lacrimosa: Premiered with Rex Tremendae and Sanctus
- Sanctus: Premiered with Rex Tremendae and Lacrimosa

== Bibliography ==
- Henze, Hans Werner. Musik und Politik: Schriften und Gespräche 1955–1975, ed. J. Brockmeier (Munich, 1976, enlarged 2/1984; Eng. trans., 1982) [incl. Essays, 1964]
- Henze, Hans Werner. Reiselieder mit böhmischen Quinten: autobiographische Mitteilungen. 1926–1995 (Frankfurt, 1996; Eng. trans., 1998)
- Henze, Hans Werner. Ein Werkverzeichnis. 1946–1996 Schott, Mainz, 1996.
- Palmer-Fuchsel, Virginia: Hans Werner Henze, Grove Music Online ed. L. Macy
