= Requiem (Howells) =

The Requiem by Herbert Howells was written in 1932, but first published almost fifty years later in 1981. It is set for unaccompanied choir with soloists, using a combination of texts from the traditional Requiem mass and other sacred sources. It is divided into six movements:

1. "Salvator mundi" ("O Saviour of the world", sung in English)
2. Psalm 23 ("The Lord is my shepherd")
3. Requiem aeternam (1)
4. Psalm 121 ("I will lift up mine eyes")
5. Requiem aeternam (2) (a second distinct setting)
6. "I heard a voice from heaven" (Revelation 14)

After the death of his son Michael in 1935, Howells used much of the material from the Requiem in his work Hymnus Paradisi for soloists, large chorus and orchestra, which was first performed at the Three Choirs Festival in 1950. The original a cappella Requiem remained unperformed until 1980, when the BBC Singers gave the premiere performance under John Poole, with the score published by Novello the following year.

== See also ==
- List of compositions by Herbert Howells
