= Polish Requiem =

Catholic funeral mass

- by Krzysztof Penderecki
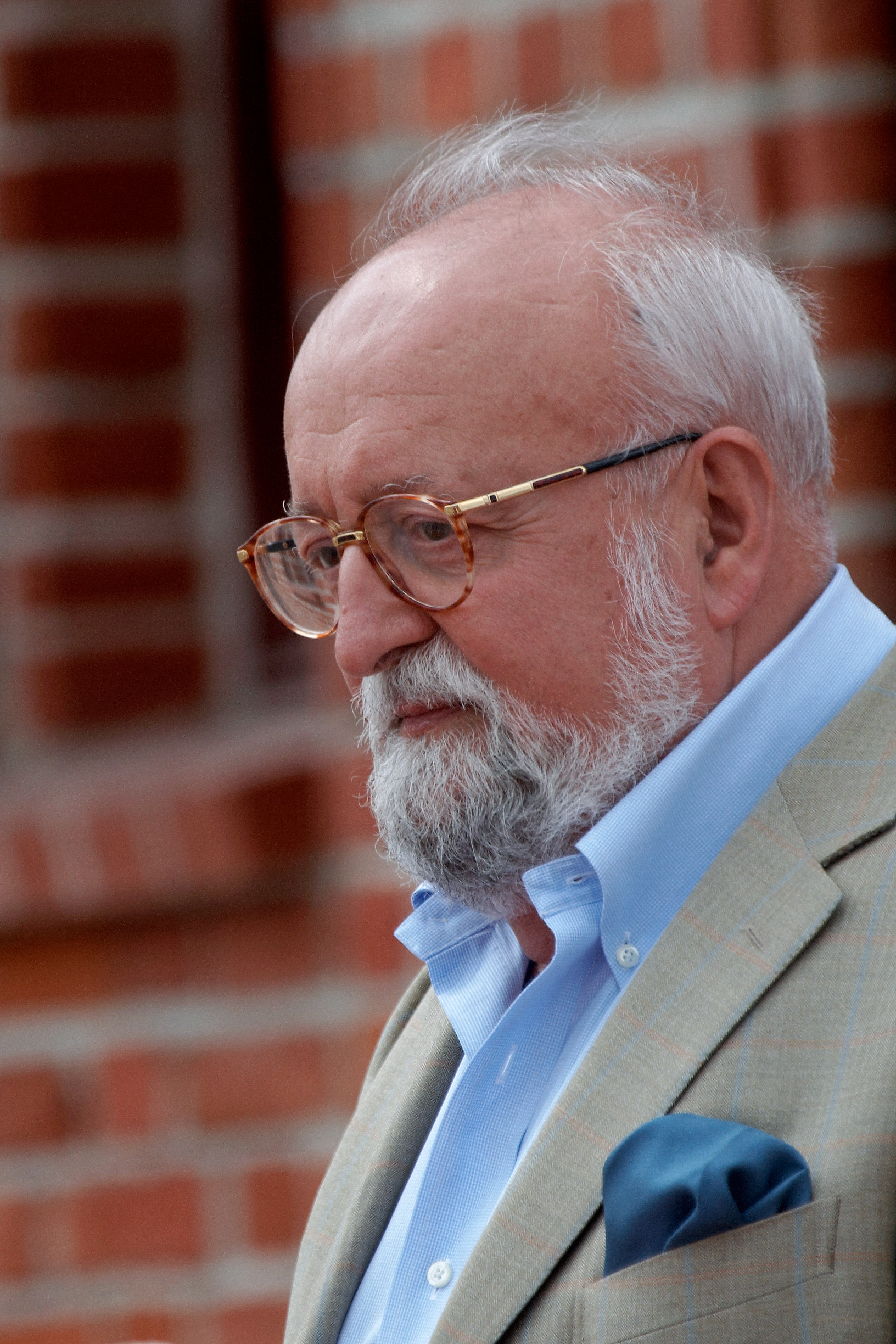
- The composer in 2008
- Native name: Polskie Requiem
- Text: Requiem; Święty Boże
- Language: Latin; Polish
- Performed: 28 September 1984 Stuttgart

Polish Requiem (Polish: Polskie Requiem; German: Polnisches Requiem), also A Polish Requiem, is a large-scale requiem mass for soloists, mixed choir and orchestra by the Polish composer Krzysztof Penderecki. The Lacrimosa, dedicated to the trade union leader Lech Wałęsa, was written for the unveiling of a statue at the Gdańsk Shipyard to commemorate those killed in the Polish anti-government riots in 1970. He expanded the work into a requiem, writing other parts to honour different patriotic events over the next four years.

The Polish Requiem was first performed in Stuttgart on 28 September 1984. Penderecki revised and expanded the work in 1993, and expanded it again in 2005 with the additional movement, Ciaccona. It is called Polish Requiem because its parts are dedicated to heroes and victims of Polish history.

One of the better-known works by Penderecki, the mass largely follows the liturgical Latin of the requiem format with the addition of Święty Boże, the Polish translation of the Trisagion.

== History ==
During 1980, Penderecki was commissioned by the Polish trade union Solidarity to compose a piece to accompany the unveiling of a statue at the Gdańsk shipyards to commemorate those killed in the Polish anti-government riots in 1970. Penderecki responded with the Lacrimosa, dedicated to Lech Wałęsa, which he later expanded into this requiem, writing other parts in honour of different patriotic events. The Agnus Dei was composed in 1981 in memory of his friend, Cardinal Stefan Wyszyński. The Recordare was written in 1982 for the beatification of the Franciscan Maximilian Kolbe who was murdered in the Auschwitz concentration camp. The Dies irae was written in memory of the Warsaw Uprising of August and September 1944. Libera me, Domine was written commemorating the victims of the Katyn massacre. A first version of the requiem was performed on 28 September 1984 by the Stuttgart Radio Symphony Orchestra under the direction of Mstislav Rostropovich.

Jesu Pie
Sample of the final movement

In 1993 the Sanctus was added and the revised version conducted by the composer at a Penderecki festival in Stockholm on 11 November 1993. The composer remarked in 1998, speaking about the work's historical and patriotic significance: "I don't write political music. Political music is immediately obsolete. My Threnody to the Victims of Hiroshima remains important because it is abstract music. The Requiem is dedicated to certain people and events, but the music has a broader significance."

In 2005 the composer added another movement in memory of Pope John Paul II, Ciaccona "in memoria Giovanni Paolo II per archi" (in memory of John Paul II for strings). The completed Requiem was first performed on 17 September 2005 in Wrocław, during Wratislavia Cantans 2005, by Polish National Radio Symphony Orchestra Katowice, under the direction of the composer himself.

== Instrumentation, words and structure ==
The Polish Requiem is scored for soprano, mezzo-soprano, tenor and bass soloists, SATB mixed choirs, and an orchestra consisting of three flutes (third doubling piccolo), three oboes, three clarinets in B♭, one bass clarinet, three bassoons, one contrabassoon; six horns in F, four trumpets in C, four trombones, one tuba; a percussion section consisting of 2 timpanists, three suspended cymbals, cymbals, 2 tam-tams, bass drum, snare drum, tenor drum, military snare drum, six tom-toms, five timbales, alto wood block, tubular bells, mass bell, church bells, ratchet, whip, glockenspiel, vibraphone, xylophone; and strings. It is structured in seventeen movements; the duration is given by the publisher Schott as 110 minutes. The additional ciaccona is set for string orchestra. It has been published, performed and recorded also separately.

The name of the work is similar to A German Requiem, composed of sections from the bible in German. But Penderecki followed the liturgical Latin of the Requiem (Mass for the deceased) and expanded it by the Trisagion in Polish, Święty Boże, a "supplication sung in Poland in moments of danger" that appears in a separate movement (Offertorium) and also in the Recordare. Penderecki changed the order slightly by moving the Communion closer to the end and creating a Finale.

1. Introitus – choir
2. Kyrie – soloists, choir

Sequence Dies irae

3. Dies irae – choir
4. Tuba mirum – bass, choir
5. Mors stupebit – mezzo-soprano, choir
6. Quid sum miser – choir
7. Rex tremendae – bass, choir
8. Recordare Jesu pie – music from Święty Boże, all soloists, choir
9. Ingemisco tanquam reus – soloists, choir
10. Lacrimosa – soprano, female choir

11. Sanctus – mezzo-soprano, choir, Benedictus – tenor, choir
12. Ciaccona
13. Agnus Dei – choir a cappella
14. Communion Lux aeterna – choir
15. Libera me, Domine – soprano, soloists, choir
16. Offertorium Święty Boże, święty mocny– soloists, choir
17. Finale Libera animas – soloists, choir

== Oratorian music theatre ==
Regina Chłopicka, an author of studies on Penderecki's music, wrote about his work in relation to earlier funeral masses:

He reaches out for a number of traditional elements, yet transforms them, builds a new hierarchy and subjugates grand dramatic forms of a monumental, theatrical character to his own, original concept. The Polish Requiem could be called a dramatic oratorio or an oratorian music theatre whose main subject is man’s attitude to death. Instead of God, however, this theatre puts man in the centre, and focuses on his vacillation between hope and doubt and faith and despair and his pursuit of universal values and of the sense of existence. The oratorian music theatre of the 'Polish Requiem' is staged within four main dimensions, four zones of symbolic meanings. The first of them is offered by the music theatre of horror invoked by the vision of the Last Judgment and from the sequence 'Dies irae' and the responsorium 'Libera me'. The second one is born out of references to communal rituals of prayer which form a kind of a mystery theatre. The third sphere expresses the feelings and emotions of a man analyzing his living, while the fourth one – which could be termed the "Polish' zone" – shows Penderecki's ties with the 'here and now', the man’s rooting in the history of his time".

== Premieres ==
- Partial premiere (8 movements): 23 November 1983, Washington, D. C., National Symphony Orchestra, soloists, Choral Arts Society of Washington, conductor Mstislav Rostropovich.
- Premiere: 28 September 1984, Stuttgart, Radio-Sinfonieorchester Stuttgart, Choir of the Staatsoper Stuttgart and Südfunk-Chor, Phyllis Bryn-Julson, Doris Soffel, Ryszard Karczykowski, Stafford Dean, conductor Mstislaw Rostropowitsch
- Premiere of the revised version: 11 November 1993, Stockholm, Penderecki Festival 1993, Royal Stockholm Philharmonic Orchestra and Chorus, Katarina Dalayman, Brigitta Svendén, Zachos Terzakis, Kurt Rydl, conductor Krzysztof Penderecki
- Premiere of the final version: September 17, 2005 – Cathedral of St. Mary Magdalene (Wrocław, Poland), Wratislavia Cantans 2005, Polish National Radio Symphony Orchestra Katowice, The Katowice City Singers' Ensemble Camerata Silesia, Izabela Kłosińska, Jadwiga Rappé, Adam Zdunikowski, Piotr Nowacki, conductor: Krzysztof Penderecki

== Recordings ==
- Polish Requiem, Jadwiga Gadulanka (soprano), Jadwiga Rappé (mezzo-soprano), Henryk Grychnik (tenor), Carlo Zardo (bass), Polish Radio and Television Choir, Cracow Philharmonic Choir, Polish Radio National Symphony Orchestra, conductor Antoni Wit (1985)
- Polish Requiem, Ingrid Haubold (soprano), Grazyna Winogrodska (mezzo-soprano), Zachos Terzakis (tenor), Malcolm Smith (bass), NDR Chor, Chor des Bayerischen Rundfunks, NDR Sinfonieorchester, conducted by the composer (1990)
- A Polish Requiem, Jadwiga Gadulanka (soprano), Jadwiga Rappé (mezzo-soprano), Zachos Terzakis (tenor), Piotr Nowacki (bass), Royal Stockholm Philharmonic Chorus & Orchestra, conducted by Krzysztof Penderecki, Chandos (1995)
- A Polish Requiem, Izabela Klosinska, Jadwiga Rappé, Ryszard Minkiewicz, Piotr Nowacki, Warsaw National Philharmonic Orchestra, conducted by Antoni Wit, Naxos (2004)

== Performances and recordings of the Ciaccona ==
- Premiere: 17 September 2005 Wrocław, St. Mary Magdalene, Wratislavia Cantans 2005, Polish National Radio Symphony Orchestra Katowice, conductor Krzysztof Penderecki
- Concert for the 75th birthday of the composer: 11 July 2008 Eberbach Abbey, Rheingau Musik Festival, Sinfonietta Cracovia, conductor Krzysztof Penderecki
- 22 May 2009 Seoul Arts Center, Seoul International Music Festival, Opening concert Beyond Ideology, Korean Chamber Orchestra
- recording Music for Chamber Orchestra, Sinfonia Varsovia, conductor Krzystof Penderecki, Dux Recording (2009)

== Agnus Dei for cellos ==
Penderecki arranged the Agnus Dei for eight cellos, first performed in the memorial service for Mstislav Rostropovich on 3 October 2007, in St. John's Church in Kronberg (Germany) by teachers and students of the Kronberg Academy, conducted by Frans Helmerson.
