= Requiem Canticles =

15-minute composition by Igor Stravinsky

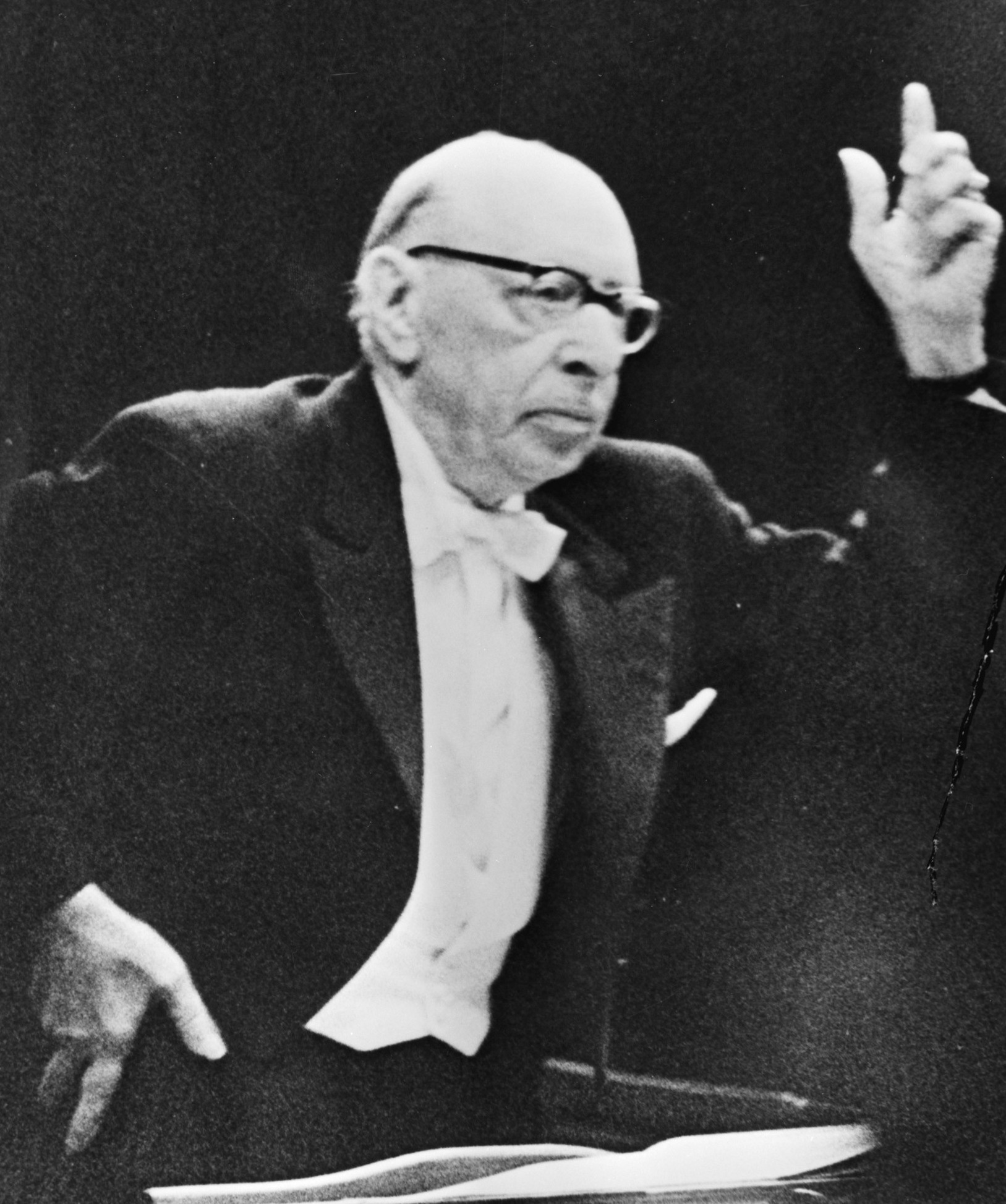
Igor Stravinsky in 1965

Requiem Canticles is a 15-minute composition by Igor Stravinsky, for contralto and bass soli, chorus, and orchestra. Stravinsky completed the work in 1966, and it received its first performance that same year.

The work is a partial setting of the Roman Catholic requiem mass, with the six vocal movements in Latin. It is from Stravinsky's serial period, but it has elements from all his stylistic periods. It was performed at Stravinsky's funeral five years after its initial premiere.

== Orchestration ==
Requiem Canticles is scored for contralto and bass soloists, mixed chorus, and an orchestra consisting of 3 flutes (3rd doubles on piccolo), alto flute, 2 bassoons, 4 horns, 2 trumpets, 3 trombones, timpani (2 performers), 2 percussionists (xylophone, vibraphone, and tubular bells), harp, piano, celesta, and strings.

== Structure ==
The piece consists of nine short movements:

1. Prelude
2. "Exaudi"
3. "Dies irae"
4. "Tuba mirum"
5. Interlude
6. "Rex tremendae"
7. "Lacrimosa"
8. "Libera me"
9. Postlude

Joseph N. Straus has discussed in detail Stravinsky's particular application of serial technique in the work, and his devising and use of a system of "rotational arrays" and "four-part arrays" in composing the work. David Smyth has noted Stravinsky's incorporation of the "B–A–C–H" (B♭–A–C–B♮) motif in the work.

Requiem Canticles is characteristic of Stravinsky's twelve-tone practice in that he preferred the inverse-retrograde (IR) to the typical retrograde-inverse (RI):

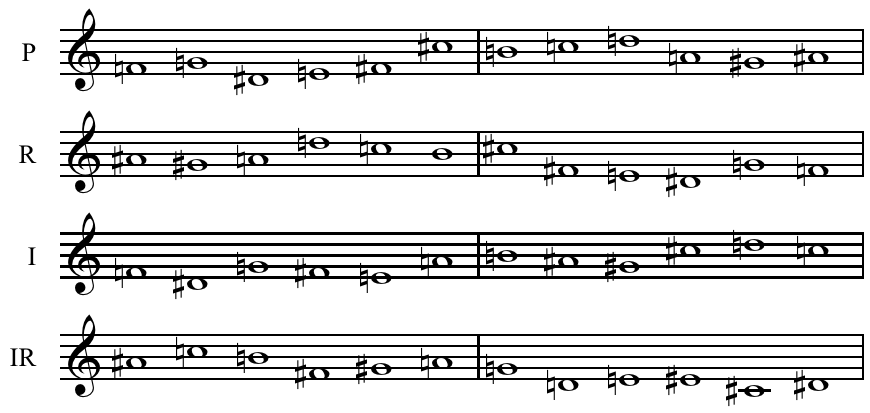
A sample of row forms from Stravinsky's Requiem Canticles: P R I IR
