= Robert Steadman =

British composer of classical music (born 1965)

Robert Steadman (born 1 April 1965) is a British composer of classical music who mostly works in a post-minimalist style but also writes lighter music, including musicals, and compositions for educational purposes. He also teaches, writes articles for music education journals, notably Classroom Music, and has written several revision guides for GCSE Music and A-level Music Technology.

== Background ==
Steadman was born in Chiswick, London, and brought up in Basingstoke, Hampshire. He was a pupil at Richard Aldworth School, before studying on the Pre-Professional Music Course at Cricklade College, Andover. In 1984 he gained an Associate of the Royal College of Music (A.R.C.M.) in tuba.

He read music at Keble College, Oxford, graduating in 1986.

== Compositions ==
While much of his output has been written for amateurs and young musicians he has also written several pieces of music for the percussionist Evelyn Glennie, for the Royal Philharmonic Orchestra, for the London Brass Virtuosi, for saxophonist Sarah Field and for the East of England Orchestra (now Sinfonia ViVA). He has written three symphonies, two operas, and several choral compositions. He has written a great deal for amateurs and children. He has also written many chamber music pieces, including those for the Holywell Ensemble. One of his anthems was used at the memorial service for the Dunblane Massacre. The "Tehillim for Anne" was composed in honor of Anne Frank's 75th birthday.

== Teaching ==
In 2013, Steadman was banned from classroom teaching in England for five years, by The National College for Teaching and Leadership professional conduct panel after it was found he had engaged in an inappropriate relationship with a student while teaching part-time at Lady Manners School in Bakewell.

== Discography ==
- The Rains are Coming (1997)
- Nottingham Songbook (2000)
- Kintamarni (2003)

== Bibliography ==
- Robert Steadman Lifelines: AQA GCSE Music (Rhinegold Publishing, ISBN 1-906178-06-2)
- Chris Duffill & Rob Steadman.Lifelines: Edexcel AS Music Technology (Rhinegold Publishing, ISBN 1-906178-04-6)
- Chris Duffill & Rob Steadman.Lifelines: Edexcel A2 Music Technology (Rhinegold Publishing, ISBN 1-906178-05-4)
