= Thierry Lancino =

French composer (born 1954)

Thierry Lancino (born 27 March 1954) is a French composer.

Thierry Lancino was born in Civray, Vienne. He was appointed Pensionnaire of the French Academy in Rome (1988–90) at the Villa Medici. During that time he wrote his often-performed music theater work. Lancino was on the artistic staff at the IRCAM (Institut de Recherche et Coordination Acoustique/Musique) for seven years.

== Works ==
- Requiem, (2006–2009) on a libretto by Pascal Quignard - creation: Salle Pleyel 8 January 2010
- Who is the Third?, (2008) for mixed a cappella choir, text by T. S. Eliot
- Concerto for violin and orchestra, (2004–2005)
- Préludes, Etudes et Inventions for piano (2003–2005)
- Vanishing Point, for clarinets and 2 percussion instruments (2001–2002)
- Prélude et Mort de Virgile, for baritone and orchestra (1997–2001)
- La Mort de Virgile, lyrical suite for 4 singers and orchestra (1997–2000)
- L'Esprit et l'Eau, for baritone and string quartet, text by Paul Claudel (1999)
- Cinq Caprices, for violin and piano (1998)
- Salve Regina, for solo voice and drone(1998)
- Ode, for choir, brass and cymbals, text by Paul Claudel (1997)
- Prelude, for piano (1997)
- Divertimento, for orchestra (1997)
- Prisme, for organ (1996)
- Journal d'Esquisses, for piano (1995–96)
- Der Abstieg, prelude for La Mort de Virgile, for orchestra (1995–1996)
- La Nef des fous, for narrator, 2 singers and small ensemble (1990–1996)
- Sonata, for solo cello (1995)
- Hors Champ, for string trio, choreography by Taffanel (1992–1993)
- Brass Quintet, (1992–1993)
- Das Narrenschiff (2nd book), for baritone and small ensemble (1991–1992)
- Limbes, symphonies for wind and electronic instruments (1989–1990)
- Das Narrenschiff (1st book), for mezzo-soprano and small ensemble (1989–1990)
- String Trio, (1988–1989)
- Les Raboteurs, for string trio, choreography by Preljocaj (1988)
- Aloni, for contralto, children's choir, ensemble and electronic instruments (1986–1987)
- Profondeurs de Champ, for base clarinet, orchestra and band (1983–1984)
- Static Arches, electronic music(1980–1981)

== Career ==
From 1972 to 1977 Lancino studied at the University of Poitiers. Then he was awarded prizes in composition and electroacoustic at the Paris Conservatory.

From 1981 to 1988 Lancino taught at the Pompidou Centre's Institute for Research and Coordination in Acoustics/Music.

In 2007 Lancino was awarded the prestigious commission from the Koussevitzky Music Foundation.

== Sources and external links ==
- Biographie et catalogue sur le site de l'IRCAM
- Thierry Lancino, site officiel
- Radio France
- PQEV.org: biography and photo (in French)
