= SATB =

Scoring for soprano, alto, tenor, bass

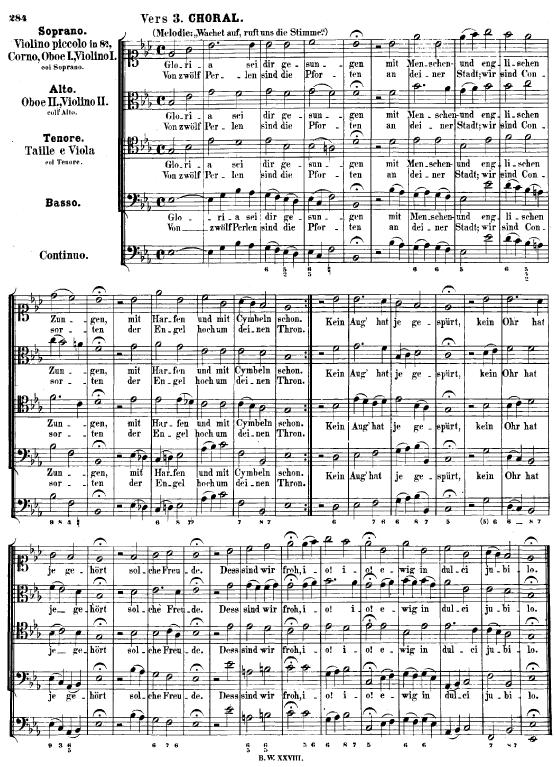
Four-voice SATB arrangement of Bach's Cantata BWV 140.

In music, SATB is a scoring of compositions for choirs or consorts of instruments consisting of four voice types: soprano, alto, tenor and bass.

== Choral music ==
Four-part harmony using soprano, alto, tenor and bass is a common scoring in classical music, including chorales and most Bach cantatas.

The letters of the abbreviation are also used by publishers to describe different scorings for soloists and choirs other than four-part harmony. For example, the listing "STB solos, SATB choir" of Bach's Wachet auf, ruft uns die Stimme, BWV 140, indicates that a performance needs three soloists: soprano, tenor and bass, and a four-part choir. "SATB/SATB" is used when a double choir is required, as in Penderecki's Polish Requiem. SSATB, with divided sopranos, is a typical scoring in English church music. A listing for Bach's Mass in B minor includes the maximum of SSATB soloists and SSAATTBB eight-part choir and also indicates that it contains choral movements for SATB, SSATB, SSATBB and SATB/SATB, as well as arias for individual soloists, and duets for SS, ST and SA.

Other letters of abbreviation, however with less consistency, have been used by publishers, such as "Tr" for treble (boy soprano), "Mz" for mezzo-soprano, "Ba", "Bar" or "Bari" for baritone, "C" for both canto (the highest part) and contralto, and "Ct" for countertenor. "SATB div." indicates that parts are sometimes divided (divisi) during a piece, often sharing the same staff.

Moreover, multiple parts can be assigned; first tenors, second basses, and so on.

== Notation ==
When the soprano and alto are notated in one staff, all stems for the soprano go up, and all for the alto go down. Similarly, when the tenor and bass are notated in one staff, the upper voice is marked by stems up, and both voices are written in bass clef, while the tenor is usually written in treble clef marked an octave down if it has its own staff.

"SATB-style"
voice	staff	stem
soprano (S)	treble clef	up
alto (A)	treble clef	down
tenor (T)	bass clef	up
bass (B)	bass clef	down

== Instrumental music ==
In a broader sense, choirs of instruments can also be described by the abbreviation SATB, often for members of the same family of instruments, such as consorts of recorders, viola da gamba, saxophones (Note: SATB saxophone quartets consist of a soprano, alto, tenor, and baritone saxophone.) and trombones. The abbreviations are also a common way to describe which "voices" perform in instrumental compositions such as fugues, including Bach's The Art of Fugue and The Musical Offering, written without indicating specific instruments.
