= One Across, Two Down =

1971 novel by Ruth Rendell

- First edition (UK)
- Author: Ruth Rendell
- Language: English
- Genre: Crime, Mystery novel
- Publisher: Hutchinson (UK); The Crime Club (US)
- Publication date: 1 March 1971
- Publication place: United Kingdom
- Media type: Print (Hardback & Paperback)
- Pages: 191 pp
- ISBN: 0-09-105840-6
- OCLC: 137503
- Dewey Decimal: 823/.9/14
- LC Class: PZ4.R4132 On PR6068.E63

One Across, Two Down is a psychological suspense novel by British writer Ruth Rendell. It was first published in 1971. In 1976, it was made into the film, Diary of the Dead by Arvin Brown, written by I.C. Rapoport, and starring Geraldine Fitzgerald and Hector Elizondo.

== Plot ==
Stanley Manning is a fortysomething petrol-station attendant and hobbyist crossword puzzler who lives with his wife, Vera, and mother-in-law, Maud. Maud is a controlling elderly woman who despises Stanley as a ne’er-do-well, based partly on his conviction prior to meeting Vera for mugging an old woman. They make Vera's life unhappy as they bicker every day, but on learning that Maud has £20,000 (£284,825 as of 2019, per inflation) due in her will to Vera, Stanley plans to deal with Maud once and for all by interfering with her medication.

Things go steadily wrong when Maud's friend Ethel comes to stay, and soon Stanley's crosswords become an obsession as he tries to stay calm in the face of danger on several fronts.
