= The Wings of the Dove (opera) =

Opera by Douglas Moore

The Wings of the Dove is an opera in 2 acts and 6 scenes by the American composer Douglas Moore that uses an English-language libretto by Ethan Ayer based on the 1902 novel of the same name by Henry James. Commissioned by the New York City Opera, the work premiered on October 12, 1961, at New York City Center, in a production directed by Christopher West with sets by Donald Oenslager, costumes by Patton Campbell, and choreography by Robert Joffrey. Written in a Neo-Romantic style, the work is composed in the tradition of the verismo opera of Giacomo Puccini.

== Roles ==
Roles, voice types, premiere cast
Role	Voice type	Premiere cast, 12 October 1961 Conductor: Julius Rudel
Kate Croy	mezzo-soprano	Regina Sarfaty
Homer Croy	baritone	Paul Ukena
Milly Theale	soprano	Dorothy Coulter
Aunt Maud	mezzo-soprano	Martha Lipton
Miles	baritone	John Reardon
Susan Stringham	soprano	Mary LeSawyer
Lord Mark	tenor	Norman Kelley
Steffens	baritone	Richard Fredricks
The Lecturer	tenor	Maurice Stern
Giuliano		Frederic Milstein
Janus		Gerald Arpino and Paul Sutherland
Goddess of Spring	dance role	Françoise Martinet
