= Porretta =

Porretta may refer to:

- Porretta Terme, town of the Reno Valley Tuscan-Emilian Apennines, a frazione of the comune of Alto Reno Terme, Emilia-Romagna
- Frank Porretta (1930– 2015), American tenor
