= Opera in the Pines =

Maine Opera company

Opera in the Pines is a professional Maine-based opera company founded in 2022.

== History ==
Founded in 2022 by three Maine-native singers, Lauren Yokabaskas, Sable Strout and Aaron Rivard, Opera in the Pines launched its premiere season with the production of Russian composer Grigory Frid’s monogrammatic opera, The Diary of Anne Frank. It featured actress, Rachel Policar, in the title role. Described as an "alternative opera company committed to reinventing the opera experience" through site-specific productions, the opera was staged at the Maine Jewish Holocaust Museum in Portland, Maine. The production won third prize in The American Prize in Opera Performance.

In keeping with their mission to provide "on-site opera", Opera in the Pines has staged productions such as American composer Robert Ward’s The Crucible in a "legendary haunted church" (The Old Red Church) in Standish, Maine; along with a reimagined version of Rossini's The Barber of Seville ("The Barber of the Cape"), staged in a lobster restaurant in Cape Neddick, Maine.

In 2023, the company staged Giacomo Puccini’s La bohème at various locations throughout Maine in a "first-of-its-kind bar crawl"; which included a beer tasting taproom, a winery, and a distillery. The company celebrated their fifth anniversary with an immersive production of Giuseppe Verdi’s 1859 opera Un ballo in maschera (A Masked Ball). The production took place at the historic Maine State Building in Poland, Maine; in keeping with the opera’s political theme and resetting by Verdi to colonial-era New England.

== Productions ==
- The Diary of Anne Frank, Grigory Frid, 2022
- La bohème, Giacomo Puccini, 2023
- The Crucible, Robert Ward, 2024
- "The Barber of the Cape" (The Barber of Seville), Gioachino Rossini, 2025
- Un ballo in maschera, Giuseppe Verdi, 2026
