= All My Sons =

Play by Arthur Miller

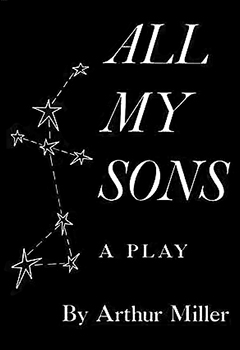
- First edition 1947
- Original language: English
- Written by: Arthur Miller
- Genre: Tragedy
- Setting: The Kellers' yard in late August 1947

Premiere
- Date: January 29, 1947
- Place: Coronet Theatre, New York City

All My Sons is a three-act play written in 1946 by Arthur Miller. It opened on Broadway at the Coronet Theatre in New York City on January 29, 1947, closed on November 8, 1947, and ran for 328 performances. It was directed by Elia Kazan (to whom it is dedicated), produced by Kazan and Harold Clurman, and won the New York Drama Critics' Circle Award. It starred Ed Begley, Beth Merrill, Arthur Kennedy, and Karl Malden and won both the Tony Award for Best Author and the Tony Award for Best Direction of a Play. The play was adapted for films in 1948 and 1987.

== Background ==
Miller wrote All My Sons after his first play The Man Who Had All the Luck failed on Broadway, lasting only four performances. Miller wrote All My Sons as a final attempt at writing a commercially successful play; he vowed to "find some other line of work" if the play did not find an audience.

All My Sons is based upon a true story, which Miller's then-mother-in-law pointed out in an Ohio newspaper. The news story described how in 1941–43 the Wright Aeronautical Corporation based in Ohio had conspired with army inspection officers to approve defective aircraft engines destined for military use. The story of defective engines had reached investigators working for Sen. Harry Truman's congressional investigative board after several Wright aircraft assembly workers informed on the company; they later testified under oath before Congress. In 1944, three Army Air Force officers, Lt. Col. Frank C. Greulich, Major Walter A. Ryan, and Major William Bruckmann were relieved of duty and later convicted of neglect of duty.

Henrik Ibsen's influence on Miller is evident from the Ibsen play The Wild Duck, from where Miller took the idea of two partners in a business where one is forced to take moral and legal responsibility for the other. This is mirrored in All My Sons. He also borrowed the idea of a character's idealism being the source of a problem.

The criticism of the American Dream, which lies at the heart of All My Sons, was one reason why Miller was called to appear before the House Un-American Activities Committee during the 1950s, when America was gripped by anti-communist sentiment. Miller sent a copy of the play to Elia Kazan who directed the original stage version of All My Sons. Kazan was a former member of the Communist Party who shared Miller's left-wing views. However, their relationship was destroyed when Kazan gave names of suspected Communists to the House Un-American Activities Committee during the Red Scare.

== Characters ==
- Joe Keller — Joe, 60, was exonerated after being charged with knowingly shipping defective aircraft engine cylinder heads (for Curtiss P-40 fighters) from his factory during World War II, becoming (in his own words) "the guy who made 21 P-40s crash in Australia". For over three years he has placed the blame on his partner and former neighbor, Steve Deever, although he himself committed the crime. When the truth comes out, Joe justifies his actions by claiming that he did it for his family.
- Kate Keller (Mother) — Joe's wife, Kate, 50, knows that Joe is guilty but lives in denial while mourning for her elder son Larry, who has been "missing in action" for three years. She refuses to believe that Larry is dead and maintains that Ann Deever — who returns for a visit at the request of Larry's brother Chris — is still "Larry's girl" and also believes that he is coming back.
- Chris Keller — Joe's son, Chris, 32, returned home from World War II two years before the play begins, disturbed by the realization that the world was continuing as if nothing had happened. He has summoned Ann Deever to the Keller house in order to ask her hand for marriage, but they're faced with the obstacle of Kate's unreasonable conviction that Larry will someday return. Chris idolizes his father, not knowing what he has done.
- Ann Deever — daughter of the convicted Steve Deever, Ann, 26, arrives at the Keller home having shunned her "guilty" father since his imprisonment. Throughout the play, Ann is often referred to as pretty, beautiful, and intelligent-looking and as "Annie". She had a relationship with Larry Keller before his disappearance and has since moved on because she knows the truth of his fate. She hopes that the Kellers will consent to her marriage to Larry's brother, Chris, with whom she has corresponded by mail for two years. Ann is the truth-bearer in the play.
- George Deever — George, 31, is Ann's older brother: a successful New York lawyer, World War II veteran, and a childhood friend of Chris. He initially believed in his father's guilt, but upon visiting Steve in jail, realizes his innocence and becomes enraged at the Kellers for deceiving him. He returns to stop his sister from marrying Chris, creating the catalyzing final events.
- Dr. Jim Bayliss — Jim, 40, is a successful doctor, but is frustrated with the stifling domesticity of his life. He wants to become a medical researcher, but continues in his job as it pays the bills. He is a close friend to the Keller family and spends a lot of time in their backyard.
- Sue Bayliss — Jim's wife, Sue, 40: needling and dangerous but affectionate. She too is a friend of the Keller family, but is secretly resentful of what she sees as Chris's bad idealistic influence on Jim. Sue confronts Ann with her resentment of Chris in a particularly volatile scene.
- Frank Lubey — Frank, 33, was always one year ahead of the draft, so he did not serve in World War II. Instead, he married George's former sweetheart, Lydia. He draws up Larry's horoscope and tells Kate that Larry must still be alive, because the day he went missing was meant to be his "favorable day." This strengthens Kate's faith and makes it much harder for Ann to move on.
- Lydia Lubey — Lydia, 27, was George's love interest before the war; after he went away, she married Frank and they soon had three children. She is a model of peaceful domesticity and lends a much-needed cheerful air to several moments of the play.
- Bert — Bert, 8, is a little boy who lives in the neighborhood; he is friends with the Bayliss' son Tommy and frequently visits the Kellers' yard to play "jail" with Joe. He appears only twice in the play: the first time, his part seems relatively unimportant, but the second time his character is more important as he sparks a verbal attack from mother when mentioning "jail," which highlights Joe's secret.

Unseen characters

- Larry Keller — the Kellers' younger son, Larry has been missing in action for some years at the start of the play. However, his presence haunts the play, due to his mother's insistence that he is still alive and because his brother Chris wishes to marry Larry's childhood sweetheart, Ann. Comparisons are also made in the story between Larry and Chris; in particular, their father describes Larry as the more sensible one with a "head for business."
- Steve Deever — George and Ann's father and Joe Keller's former business partner. Steve is serving a prison sentence for the crime of knowingly shipping defective engines to the Air Force, while Joe has escaped punishment by lying and saying the fault was Steve's alone.

== Cast ==
Character	Broadway	West End Revival	Broadway Revival	Broadway Revival	West End Revival	London Revival	Broadway Revival	West End Revival	Broadway Revival
Character	1947	1981	1987	2008	2010	2019		2025	2027
Joe Keller	Ed Begley	Colin Blakely	Richard Kiley	John Lithgow	David Suchet	Bill Pullman	Tracy Letts	Bryan Cranston	Bryan Cranston
Kate Keller	Beth Merrill	Rosemary Harris	Joyce Ebert	Dianne Wiest	Zoë Wanamaker	Sally Field	Annette Bening	Marianne Jean-Baptiste	Marianne Jean-Baptiste
Chris Keller	Arthur Kennedy	Garrick Hagon	Jamey Sheridan	Patrick Wilson	Stephen Campbell Moore	Colin Morgan	Benjamin Walker	Paapa Essiedu	
Ann Deever	Lois Wheeler	Jill Baker	Jayne Atkinson	Katie Holmes	Jemima Rooper	Jenna Coleman	Francesca Carpanini	Hayley Squires	
Dr. Jim Bayliss	John McGovern	David Baron	Dan Desmond	Damian Young	Steven Elder	Sule Rimi	Michael Hayden	Richard Hansell	
Frank Lubey	Dudley Sadler	Ken Drury	Stephen Root	Jordan Gelber	Tom Vaughan-Lawlor	Gunnar Cauthery	Nehal Joshi	Zach Wyatt	
Lydia Lubey	Hope Cameron	Pamela Merrick	Dawn Didawick	Danielle Ferland	Olivia Darnley	Bessie Carter	Jenni Barber	Aliyah Odoffin	
George Deever	Karl Malden	Richard Durden	Christopher Curry	Christian Camargo	Daniel Lapaine	Oliver Johnstone	Hampton Fluker	Tom Glynn-Carney	
Sue Bayliss	Peggy Meredith	Pat Starr	Kit Flanagan	Becky Ann Baker	Claire Hackett	Kayla Meikle	Chinasa Ogbuagu	Cath Whitefield	
Bert	Eugene Steiner	Miles Parsey; Bryan Rogan; Joseph de Marce; Daniel Holender	Michael Maronna	Michael D'Addario	Ted Allpress	Archie Barnes	Alexander Bello; Monte Greene	Charles Dark; Sammy Jones; Zayne Tayabali	

== Synopsis ==
=== Act I ===
In August 1947, Joe Keller, a self-made businessman, and his wife Kate are visited by a neighbor, Frank. At Kate's request, Frank is trying to figure out the horoscope of the Kellers' missing son Larry, who disappeared in 1943 while serving in the military during World War II. There has been a storm and the tree planted in Larry's honor has blown down during the month of his birth, strengthening Kate's belief that Larry is coming back, while Joe and Chris, the Kellers' other son, believe differently. Furthermore, Chris wishes to propose to Ann Deever, who was Larry's girlfriend at the time he went missing and who has been corresponding with Chris for two years. Joe and Kate react to this news with shock.

When Ann arrives, it is revealed that her father, Steve Deever, is in prison for selling cracked cylinder heads to the Air Force, causing the deaths of twenty-one pilots in 1943. Joe was his partner but was exonerated of the crime. Ann admits that neither she nor her brother are in touch with their father anymore. After a heated argument, Chris proposes alone to Ann, who accepts. Chris also reveals that he has survivor's guilt from losing all his men in a company he led. Meanwhile, Joe receives a phone call from George, Ann's brother, who is coming there to settle something.

=== Act II ===
Chris avoids telling his mother about his engagement with Ann. Their next-door neighbor Sue emerges and reveals to Ann that everyone on the block thinks Joe is equally guilty of the crime of supplying faulty aircraft engines. Shortly afterwards, George Deever arrives and reveals that he has just visited the prison to see his father, Steve. The latter claimed that Joe told him by phone to "weld up and paint over" the cracked cylinder heads, and send them out, then later gave a false promise that Joe would take the blame.

George insists his sister Ann cannot marry Chris Keller, the son of the man who destroyed the Deevers. Frank reveals his horoscope, which implies that Larry is alive, to Kate's pleasure. Joe maintains that he was bedridden with the flu on the fateful day of dispatch. They manage to settle George, but Kate lets slip that Joe has not been sick in fifteen years. Despite George's protests, Chris and Ann send him away.

After Kate claims to Joe and Chris that moving on from Larry would reveal Joe as a murderer, Chris concludes that George was right. Joe, out of excuses, confesses that he sent out the cracked cylinder heads to avoid closure of the business, intending to notify the base later that they needed repairs. However, when the fleet crashed and made headlines, Joe lied to Steve and abandoned him at the factory to be arrested. Chris cannot accept his explanation that it was done for the family and exclaims in despair that he does not know what to do about his father.

=== Act III ===
Chris has left home. At 2 am, Kate advises Joe to express willingness to go to prison and make Chris relent, should he return. As he only sought to make money for his family, Joe is adamant that their relationship is above the law. Soon after, Ann emerges and expresses her intention to leave with Chris regardless of Kate's disdain. When Kate angrily refuses again, Ann sends Joe away and reluctantly provides Kate with a letter from Larry. Chris returns and remains torn on whether to turn Joe over to the authorities, knowing it doesn't erase the death of his fellow soldiers or absolve the world of its natural merciless state.

Joe returns and excuses his guilt on account of the abundance of profiteers in the world. Chris wearily responds that he knew but believed that Joe was better than the others. Ann takes the letter and provides it to Chris while Kate desperately tries to push Joe away. Chris reads the letter to Joe out loud. It implies that Larry committed suicide because of his father's guilt. Joe agrees to turn himself in. He goes inside to get his coat and kills himself with a gunshot off-stage. The play ends with Chris, in tears, being consoled by Kate to not take Joe's death on himself.

==== Title ====
The play's title is taken from Joe's line at the end of Act III, right before his final exit: "Sure, [Larry] was my son. But I think to him they were all my sons. And I guess they were, I guess they were."

== Arthur Miller quotation on All My Sons ==
In his Collected Plays, Miller commented on his feelings on watching an audience's reaction to a performance of his first successful play:

The success of a play, especially one's first success, is somewhat like pushing against a door which suddenly opens from the other side. One may fall on one's face or not, but certainly a new room is opened that was always securely shut until then. For myself, the experience was invigorating. It made it possible to dream of daring more and risking more. The audience sat in silence before the unwinding of All My Sons and gasped when they should have, and I tasted that power which is reserved, I imagine, for playwrights, which is to know that by one's invention a mass of strangers has been publicly transfixed.

== Revivals ==
In 1948, All My Sons performed at The Lyric theatre at London's Hammersmith with Maltese-American actor Joseph Calleia as Joe Keller. This was the play's London premiere.

=== 1987 Broadway ===
In 1987, the Broadway revival of All My Sons won the Tony Award for Best Revival of a Play starring Richard Kiley (Tony Award nominee for Best Actor in a Play), Joyce Ebert, Jamey Sheridan (Tony Award nominee for Best Featured Actor in a Play) and Jayne Atkinson. It was produced by Jay H. Fuchs and Steven Warnick in association with Charles Patsos. It was originally produced by The Long Wharf Theatre (M. Edgar Rosenblum, executive director, Arvin Brown, artistic director). The production was directed by Arvin Brown, scenic design by Hugh Landwehr, costume design by Bill Walker, and lighting design by Ronald Wallace. It opened on April 22, 1987, at the John Golden Theatre and closed May 17, 1987.

=== 2000 National Theatre, London ===
On 30 June 2000 a Royal National Theatre production directed by Howard Davies opened in the smallest of the London complex's three spaces, the Cottesloe Theatre (now the Dorfman Theatre), and starred James Hazeldine (Joe Keller), Julie Walters (Kate Keller), Ben Daniels (Chris Keller), Catherine McCormack (Ann Deever), Duncan Bell (Dr. Jim Bayliss), Paul Ritter (Frank Lubey), Beverley Longhurst (Lydia Lubey), Charles Edwards (George Deever), Harriet Thorpe (Sue Bayliss) and, as Bert, Rory Copus and Aaron Johnson (now Aaron Taylor-Johnson). On 28 July 2001 the production transferred to the venue's Lyttelton Theatre, albeit with several cast changes, notably Laurie Metcalf taking over from Julie Walters.

=== 2008 Broadway ===
A Broadway revival began previews at the Gerald Schoenfeld Theatre on September 18, 2008, and officially opened on October 16, 2008. The limited engagement ran through until January 4, 2009. The production starred John Lithgow, Dianne Wiest, Patrick Wilson, and Katie Holmes, in her Broadway debut. The other featured actors were Becky Ann Baker, Christian Camargo, Jordan Gelber, Danielle Ferland, Damian Young, and Michael D'Addario. It was directed by Simon McBurney. The creative team consisted of scenic and costume design by Tom Pye, lighting design by Paul Anderson, sound design by Christopher Shutt and Carolyn Downing, projection design by Finn Ross, and wig and hair design by Paul Huntley.

McBurney's direction of All My Sons grew out of a meeting with Arthur Miller in 2001, shortly after the playwright saw the New York premiere of Mnemonic. Miller's daughter, Rebecca Miller, asked McBurney to direct the play.

Some controversy surrounded the production, as the internet group Anonymous staged an anti-Scientology protest at the first night of preview performances in New York City (due to cast member Katie Holmes).

=== 2010 West End ===
David Suchet and Zoë Wanamaker (both stars of Agatha Christie's Poirot) starred in a revival production at the Apollo Theatre in London's West End. Suchet played Joe Keller and Wanamaker played his wife Kate. The production also featured Jemima Rooper as Ann Deever and Stephen Campbell Moore as Chris Keller. The show ran from May–September 11, 2010; one performance was captured live and can be viewed online.

=== 2013 Manchester Royal Exchange ===
Michael Buffong, the artistic director of Talawa Theatre Company, directed the play at the Royal Exchange Theatre in Manchester. It starred Don Warrington as Joe Keller, Doña Croll as Kate Keller, Chike Okonkwo as Chris Keller, Kemi-Bo Jacobs as Ann Deever and Simon Coombs as George Deever.

=== 2015 UK Tour ===
Ray Shell and Doña Croll led this revival by Talawa Theatre Company for a national tour of the UK. Shell played Joe Keller and Croll played his wife Kate. The production also featured Kemi-Bo Jacobs as Ann Deever and Leemore Marrett Jr as Chris Keller. The tour started in February and ran until April 25, 2015.

=== 2019 London (Old Vic) ===
In April, May, and June 2019, Sally Field and Bill Pullman starred in a revival at The Old Vic alongside Jenna Coleman and Colin Morgan. The production was directed by Jeremy Herrin. On May 14, 2019, National Theatre Live live-streamed a performance to cinemas across the UK and into other countries; owing to the competing American production (see below), streaming in North America was postponed until January 2020.

=== 2019 Broadway ===
A Broadway revival presented by the Roundabout Theatre Company at the American Airlines Theatre began previews on April 4, 2019, and officially opened on April 22, starring Tracy Letts (Joe), Annette Bening (Kate), Benjamin Walker (Chris) and Monte Greene (Bert). The production was originally to be directed by Gregory Mosher, but after a casting dispute between Mosher and the estate of Arthur Miller he was replaced by Jack O'Brien. The production closed on June 30, 2019, receiving 3 Tony Award nominations: Best Revival of a Play, Best Actress in a Play (Bening), and Best Featured Actor in a Play (Walker).

=== 2025 West End ===
A new production of the play directed by Ivo van Hove opened in November 2025 at Wyndham's Theatre, starring Bryan Cranston as Joe Keller, Marianne Jean-Baptiste as Kate Keller and Paapa Essiedu as Chris Keller. The production also features Hayley Squires and Tom Glynn-Carney as Ann and George Deever. It received 6 Laurence Olivier Award nominations: Best Revival, Best Director, Actor (Cranston), Actress (Jean-Baptiste), Supporting Actor (Essiedu) and Supporting Actress (Squires), winning for Best Revival and Best Supporting Actor.

=== 2026 Berkeley ===
David Mendizábal directed a new production of the play that opened February 2026 at the Berkeley Repertory Theatre starring Jimmy Smits, Wanda De Jesus, Alejandro Hernandez, and MaYaa Boateng.

=== 2027 Broadway ===
In November 2026, it was announced the 2025 West End production directed by Ivo van Hove would transfer to the August Wilson Theatre in March 2027. Bryan Cranston and Marianne Jean-Baptiste are confirmed to reprise their roles as Joe and Kate Keller.

== Adaptations ==
All My Sons was first adapted into a film in 1948. Edward G. Robinson played Joe Keller. It was directed by Irving Reis and gained two award nominations, Best Written American Drama and The Robert Meltzer Award for the film's co-writer Chester Erskine. In the film, Steve Deever is renamed Herbert Deever, and makes an onscreen appearance, played by actor Frank Conroy.

In 1950, Lux Radio Theater broadcast a radio play of All My Sons with Burt Lancaster as Joe. The play was adapted by S. H. Barnett and, in an interesting twist, featured the character of Steve Deever in a speaking role.

In 1958, the play was adapted for British television by Stanley Mann and directed by Cliff Owen. This production starred Albert Dekker as Joe Keller, Megs Jenkins as Kate Keller, Patrick McGoohan as Chris Keller and Betta St. John as Ann Deever.

1987 All My Sons

In 1987, All My Sons was made into a made-for-TV film. This version is more faithful to Arthur Miller's original play than the 1948 film version. The main roles are James Whitmore as Joe Keller, Aidan Quinn as Chris Keller, Michael Learned as Kate Keller and Joan Allen as Ann Deever. Direction was by Jack O'Brien. Unlike the 1948 version, this version refers to George's father as Steve as in the play rather than Herb or Herbert.

In 1998, L.A. Theatre Works made a studio-based full-cast production for radio broadcast on Voice of America and NPR. The play starred Julie Harris as Kate Keller, James Farentino as Joe Keller and Arye Gross as Chris Keller.

== In popular culture ==
All My Sons is featured in the epistolary crime novel The Appeal by Janice Hallett.

All My Sons is a 1991 song by the indie band James on the B-side of the single Sound. As an anti-war song, the premise of the lyrics is the same as the plot of the play.

The Columbus, Ohio-based band Twenty One Pilots takes its name from the play after lead singer Tyler Joseph read it in theatre class.

== Awards and nominations ==
=== Original Broadway production ===
Year	Award	Category	Nominee	Result
1947	Tony Award	Best Author	Arthur Miller	Won
1947	Tony Award	Best Director	Elia Kazan	Won

=== 1987 Broadway revival ===
Year	Award	Category	Nominee	Result
1987	Tony Award	Best Revival		Won
1987	Tony Award	Best Actor in a Play	Richard Kiley	Nominated
1987	Tony Award	Best Featured Actor in a Play	Jamey Sheridan	Nominated

=== 2019 Broadway revival ===
Year	Award	Category	Nominee	Result
2019	Tony Awards	Best Revival of a Play		Nominated
2019	Tony Awards	Best Actress in a Play	Annette Bening	Nominated
2019	Tony Awards	Best Featured Actor in a Play	Benjamin Walker	Nominated

=== 2025 West End revival ===
Year	Award	Category	Nominee	Result
2026	Laurence Olivier Awards	Best Revival		Won
2026	Laurence Olivier Awards	Best Actor	Bryan Cranston	Nominated
2026	Laurence Olivier Awards	Best Actress	Marianne Jean-Baptiste	Nominated
2026	Laurence Olivier Awards	Best Actor in a Supporting Role	Paapa Essiedu	Won
2026	Laurence Olivier Awards	Best Actress in a Supporting Role	Hayley Squires	Nominated

== See also ==
- Hollywood blacklist
