= Arvin Brown =

American theatre and television director

- Born: May 24, 1940 (age 84); Los Angeles, California
- Occupation(s): Theatre director, film director

Arvin Brown (born May 24, 1940) is an American theatre and television director. He was the Artistic Director of the Long Wharf Theatre in New Haven, Connecticut for 30 years.

== Life and career ==
Born in Los Angeles, Brown made his Broadway directorial debut with a 1970 revival of Noël Coward's Hay Fever.

Under Brown, Long Wharf produced more than 200 plays, some 70 of which were staged by Brown himself. His specialty at Long Wharf and in New York was realistic American plays of the mid 20th century, often in revival. Notable Brown-directed productions include works by Arthur Miller (The Crucible, A View From the Bridge), Eugene O'Neill (A Touch of the Poet), and Rod Serling (Requiem for a Heavyweight). His directing credits also include The National Health (1974), Ah, Wilderness! (1975), Watch on the Rhine (1980), Privates On Parade (1982), American Buffalo (1983), Open Admissions (1984), Private Lives (1992), and The Twilight of the Golds (1993). Brown also has carved out a career as a director of operas, including Porgy and Bess at the Metropolitan Opera in New York.

Brown has directed for numerous television series, including multiple episodes of NCIS, Leverage, Lie to Me, The Practice, Ally McBeal, Crossing Jordan, Kevin Hill, Everwood, and The Closer, and single episodes for Picket Fences, Party of Five, Chicago Hope, Dawson's Creek, Judging Amy, Ed, Private Practice and Shark, among many others. He also directed the television adaption of The Gin Game featuring Dick Van Dyke and Mary Tyler Moore.

He has made one feature film, Diary of the Dead (1976), starring Geraldine Fitzgerald, Hector Elizondo, and Salome Jens.

He married actress Joyce Ebert on November 2, 1969, and was married to her until her death in 1997.

== Awards and nominations ==
- Tony Award, Outstanding Revival All My Sons, winner (1987)
- Tony Award, Outstanding Revival A Day in the Death of Joe Egg, winner (1985)
- Tony Award, Best Direction of a Play (Ah, Wilderness!, nominee)
- Drama Desk Award for Outstanding Director of a Play (A Memory of Two Mondays/27 Wagons Full of Cotton, nominee)
- Tony Award for Best Direction of a Play (The National Health, nominee)
- Drama Desk Vernon Rice Award, 1971 production, (Long Day's Journey Into Night, winner)
- “Mr. Abbott” Award by the Stage Directors and Choreographers Foundation
