= Paul Ukena =

American opera singer (1921–1991)

Paul Ukena (August 19, 1921 – March 10, 1991) was an American operatic baritone and musical theatre actor who had an active career from the 1940s through the 1970s. After beginning his career entertaining American troops as a part of the Special Services during World War II, his first critical success was as the baritone soloist in the American premiere of Frederick Delius's Requiem in 1950. He was one of the founding members of the NBC Opera Theatre, a company he performed with throughout the 1950s in such productions as Benjamin Britten's Billy Budd and the world premiere of Norman Dello Joio's The Trial at Rouen.

Ukena also enjoyed a lengthy association with the New York City Opera (NYCO) from 1958 to 1979. At the NYCO he notably appeared in a number of world premieres including Hugo Weisgall's Six Characters in Search of an Author (1959), Robert Ward's The Crucible (1961), and Dominick Argento's Miss Havisham's Fire (1979). At the NYCO he also starred in the United States premiere of Josef Tal's Ashmedai in 1976. He starred in the off-Broadway musicals Sandhog (1954), and Hotel for Criminals (1974), and appeared in the Broadway musicals Maggie (1953) and Cry for Us All (1970).

After the 1970s, Ukena's performance appearances became rarer as he devoted his time to teaching at Sarah Lawrence College in Yonkers, New York, where he was a professor from 1961 until his retirement in 1989. He also was a faculty member at the Mannes College of Music in the 1970s.

== Early life, education and career with the NBC Opera Theatre ==
Born in Lakota, Iowa, to Juren Eiken "Jerry" Ukena and Doris Wortmann Ukena, Ukena earned a Bachelor of Music in vocal performance from the University of Dubuque in 1943. After graduation he served as a private in the Special Services department of the Army Service Forces during World War II in which he entertained American troops in performances of stage works like Sigmund Romberg's The New Moon After the war he pursued graduate studies in opera at Southern Methodist University in 1945 and then at the Juilliard School where he earned a Master of Music in 1950. While a student at Juilliard he made his professional concert debut in 1947 at Carnegie Hall as the baritone soloist in the world premiere of Charles F. Bryan's Bell Witch Cantata with Robert Shaw conducting. He appeared as a soloist in several concerts with the Robert Shaw Chorale during his early career, and is a featured soloist on the choir's 1954 album With Love from a Chorus on the RCA-Victor label.

Ukena's first critical success came on the concert stage when he served as the baritone soloist in the United States premiere of Frederick Delius's Requiem on November 6, 1950, at Carnegie Hall in New York City with the Collegiate Chorale, the National Orchestra Association conducted by William Johnson. He made his professional opera debut a month later with the NBC Opera Theatre (NBCOT) on Christmas Day 1950 as Peter, the broom-maker, in Engelbert Humperdinck's Hansel and Gretel. He continued to perform regularly with the NBCOT through 1957, notably creating roles in the world premieres of Lukas Foss's Griffelkin (1955, as Uncle Skelter) and Norman Dello Joio's The Trial at Rouen (1956, as the Jailer).

Other roles he performed with the NBCOT included:

- Tonio in Ruggero Leoncavallo's Pagliacci (1951)
- Petermann in Jacques Offenbach's M. Choufleuri restera chez lui le . . . (1951)
- Marco in Giacomo Puccini's Gianni Schicchi (1951 and 1952)
- Sailing Master in Benjamin Britten's Billy Budd (1952)
- Zlatogor in Pyotr Ilyich Tchaikovsky's The Queen of Spades (1952)
- Antonio in Wolfgang Amadeus Mozart's The Marriage of Figaro (1954).
- Dolokhov in Sergei Prokofiev's War and Peace (1957)

== Work with the New York City Opera and other opera and concert work ==
In 1954 Ukena created the role of Tranio in the world premiere of Vittorio Giannini's The Taming of the Shrew for the NBCOT. He reprised the role for his debut with the New York City Opera (NYCO) in April 1958. He continued to perform regularly with the NYCO through 1979, notably creating roles in the world premieres of Hugo Weisgall's Six Characters in Search of an Author (1959, The Father), Robert Ward's The Crucible (1961, Thomas Putnam), Douglas Moore's The Wings of the Dove (1961, Homer Croy), and Dominick Argento's Miss Havisham's Fire (1979, Old Orlick).

Other roles he performed with the NYCO included:

- Schneidebart in Richard Strauss's Die schweigsame Frau (1958)
- Dick Dead Eye in Gilbert and Sullivan's H.M.S. Pinafore (1961, 1968, 1975)
- Mikado in Gilbert and Sullivan's The Mikado (1962)
- Richard Cholmondeley in Gilbert and Sullivan's The Yeomen of the Guard (1964, 1968)

Ukena also appeared in operas with other companies during the 1950s and 1960s. In 1954 he sang the role of Giorgio in Rossini's La gazza ladra with Arnold Gamson's American Opera Society. In 1960 he portrayed Leporello in Mozart's Don Giovanni with the Goldovsky Opera Theater. To make the offer of the tour sweeter, Goldovsky offered him the rôles of Don Giovanni and Leporello on different nights; Ukena said that he could only afford to do the tour if he were also allowed to sing the rôle of Masetto. Goldowsky agreed to this. Ron Holgate, who also sang the rôle of Don Giovanni during this tour (Sherrill Milnes also sang Masetto – his opera debut – on this tour), has said that therefore Ukena sang one of the three rôles in every performance of the entire tour. In 1956 he created the title role in the world premiere of Robert Ward's Pantaloon (later renamed He Who Gets Slapped) with the Columbia Theatre Associates and Opera Workshop. In 1963 he portrayed Don Pizzaro in Beethoven's Fidelio with the Israel National Opera in Tel Aviv with conductor William Steinberg. In 1965 he portrayed The Peasant in Carl Orff's Die Kluge at the Caramoor Summer Music Festival. On the concert stage he sang in concerts with the Cleveland Orchestra, the New York Philharmonic, and the Pittsburgh Symphony Orchestra.

== Work in musical theater ==
Ukena periodically appeared in musicals as well as opera, beginning with the original production of Gordon Jenkins's Heaven Come Wednesday with Jean Stapleton and Paul Mann at the Keene Summer Theatre, in Keene, New Hampshire, which opened on August 27, 1951. In 1952 he portrayed Fred Graham (and Petruchio) in Cole Porter's Kiss Me, Kate at the South Shore Music Circus in Massachusetts and the Lakes Region Playhouse in New Hampshire with Elaine Malbin as Lilli and Betty George as Lisa Kirk. He served as music director and conductor for the original production of William Roy's Maggie which opened in January 1953 at the Forrest Theatre in Philadelphia before transferring to the National Theatre on Broadway the following March. He appeared in several musicals with the Fort Wayne Light Opera at the Foellinger Outdoor Theatre in Franke Park, including Kiss Me Kate (1953, Fred Graham) and Rodgers and Hammerstein's Carousel (1954, Billy).

In 1954 Ukena made his off-Broadway debut at the Phoenix Theatre as Fred Burger in Earl Robinson and Waldo Salt's Sandhog which was directed by Howard da Silva and used choreography by Sophie Maslow. In 1955 he portrayed the role of Carl Linden in Noël Coward's Bitter Sweet at the Music Hall at Fair Park in Dallas. He returned there the following year to star alongside Liberace and his brother George in Hassard Short's The Great Waltz. In 1956 he starred as Kubla Khan in the television musical The Adventures of Marco Polo which was directed and produced by Max Liebman for NBC with Neil Simon as writer with music by Clay Warnick. In 1958 he portrayed Frank E. Butler in Irving Berlin's Annie Get Your Gun at Herb Rogers's Tenthouse Theater in the Round in Chicago with Helen Gallagher in the title role. In 1959 he starred with Ruth McDevitt in The Golden Wheel, a musical mounted by General Motors to promote the Cadillac, at the Waldorf Astoria New York. In 1969 he toured New England as Emile De Becque in Rodgers and Hammerstein's South Pacific; appearing at theaters like the Ogunquit Playhouse in Ogunquit, Maine, and the Cape Playhouse in Dennis, Massachusetts.

In 1970 Ukena starred as Paul Haggerty in Mitch Leigh's short lived Broadway musical Cry for Us All, and is featured on the original cast album of that show. In 1974 he starred as Fantomas in Richard Foreman and Stanley Silverman's horror musical Hotel for Criminals which premiered in Lenox, Massachusetts, at the Lenox Arts Center in August 1974 before transferring to the off-Broadway Westbeth Theatre Center in New York City the following December.

== Personal life and teaching career ==
After the 1970s, Ukena's performances became rarer as he devoted his time to teaching. After graduation from the Juilliard School, he joined the faculty, where he remained until 1961, when he joined the music faculty at Sarah Lawrence College in Yonkers, New York, where he taught until his retirement in 1989. While on the faculty at Juilliard, he was in the Juilliard Opera Theater's production of the first English translation of Rossini's Count Ory which hadn't been seen in the U.S. since 1831. The production's sets and special effects were by Saul Steinberg. He was a guest artist with the Laurentian String Quartet in 1984 in a concert at SLC performing music by Mozart, Bartók, and Othmar Schoeck. He also taught on the faculty of the Mannes College of Music in the 1970s. At Mannes he directed several opera productions, including stagings of Gian Carlo Menotti's The Old Maid and the Thief, Carl Maria von Weber's Abu Hassan, and the United States premiere of Wolfgang Fortner's Corinna (with an English translation by Ukena) at the 92nd Street Y in 1972.

Ukena's wife, Meta Ukena, was a music teacher for Pelham Public Schools in Pelham, New York, where the couple resided for thirty-five years. They had five children, among them the actor Paul Edgar Ukena Jr. Ukena Sr. died of heart failure on March 10, 1991, at Hunterdon Medical Center in New Jersey while visiting a daughter in Lebanon, New Jersey. Just prior to his death, he and his wife had moved to Mount Vernon, New York. Ukena died at Hunterdon Medical Center in Flemington, New Jersey.
