= Diary of the Dead (1976 film) =

1976 film by Arvin Brown

- Directed by: Arvin Brown
- Written by: I.C. Rapoport; Robert L. Fish; Ruth Rendell (novel One Across, Two Down)
- Produced by: Charles B. Moss Jr.
- Starring: Geraldine Fitzgerald; Hector Elizondo; Salome Jens; Joseph Maher; Austin Pendleton; Kate Wilkinson
- Cinematography: Robert M. Baldwin, Jr.
- Edited by: Murray Solomon
- Music by: Jacques Urbont
- Distributed by: B.S. Moss Enterprises
- Release date: 1976
- Running time: 93 min
- Language: English

Diary of the Dead is a 1976 neo-noir film directed by Arvin Brown, based on the 1971 novel One Across, Two Down by Ruth Rendell. It was produced by Charles B. Moss. Robert L. Fish, author of Mute Witness, the basis of Bullitt, contributed to the screenplay.

== Plot ==
Stan (Hector Elizondo) and Vera (Salome Jens), a childless couple, live with Vera's wealthy mother, Maud Kennaway (Geraldine Fitzgerald), who has already suffered a stroke. Maud dislikes and is openly contemptuous of her infertile son-in-law.

Stan dumps Kennaway's nitroglycerine pills down the toilet and replace them with worthless sugar substitutes. Maud Kennaway's friend (and Vera's godmother), Ethel Dean (Kate Wilkinson), comes to visit, but Mrs. Patterson (Joyce Ebert)'s boarding house is not ready. Unable to find her own pills, Ethel Dean uses some of Maud's now worthless ones, and dies on Stan's couch following a cardiac incident. Stan tells the 911 operator that the deceased is Maud Kennaway, and Dr. Klein (Austin Pendleton) provides the necessary paperwork for her remains to be taken away for cremation. Maud wakes up, finds the body, and accuses him of murder. Stan manages to dodge all her blows with her cane, which causes her to stumble and cut her head on the radiator. He buries his mother-in-law in the backyard and plants the new tree he purchased some time earlier on top of her remains.

Stan goes to Mrs. Patterson's boarding house to collect Ethel's things. After Maud Kennaway's will is read, in which Vera's portion is to be held in trust for any natural-born children, an investigation is opened to find Ethel Dean, also a beneficiary of Maud's will.
