= He Who Gets Slapped (disambiguation) =

He Who Gets Slapped is a 1915 play by Leonid Andreyev.

Adaptations of that play include:

- He Who Gets Slapped (film), a 1924 silent film by Victor Sjöström
- He Who Gets Slapped (opera), a 1956 opera by Robert Ward
