= The Shadow Box =

Play by Michael Cristofer

- Original language: English
- Written by: Michael Cristofer
- Characters: Maggie; Beverly; Felicity; Agnes; Brian; Joe; Mark; The Interviewer; Steve
- Genre: Drama
- Setting: Three cottages of a large hospital

Premiere
- Date: March 31, 1977
- Place: Morosco Theatre; New York City, New York

The Shadow Box is a play written by actor Michael Cristofer. The play made its Broadway debut on March 31, 1977. It is the winner of the 1977 Pulitzer Prize for Drama and Tony Award for Best Play. The play was made into a telefilm, directed by Paul Newman in 1980.

== Synopsis ==
The play takes place over 24 hours in three separate cottages on the grounds of a large hospital in the United States. Within the three cabins are three patients: Joe, Brian and Felicity, who are to live with their respective families as they have reached the end of their treatment. They have agreed to be part of a psychological program where they live within the hospital grounds and have interviews with a psychiatrist.

Act One

It is morning, and Joe is sitting in the interview area talking to the interviewer. We are introduced to the idea that he is dying and that his family is about to arrive, whom he hasn’t seen for most of his treatment. The interviewer acts as a tool for each of the patients and their families to relay their feelings about their situation; the characters speak bluntly to the interviewer. Each of the families is introduced in this section of the play. When Joe’s wife Maggie and son Steve arrive, it quickly becomes apparent that Maggie is avoiding dealing with the prospect of her future without Joe. She refuses to enter their cabin, and Steve has no idea of his father’s impending death.

Brian takes an aloof approach to his illness; he wants to live each day until the last. Rather than skirt the issues, he confronts them with a dark humor. His young gay lover Mark is with him at the camp. Beverly, Brian's "trashy but devoted ex-wife," arrives.

The third family is Felicity and her daughter Agnes. Felicity is "an old woman who drifts between senility and combative lucidness." Her daughter Agnes is "a mousy, browbeaten spinster who tries to keep her mother happy with fictional letters from a daughter who in fact is long dead."

It is a normal day for each of these characters; getting to learn their individuality is the heart of the play. The act flows between the serious and the humorous. The first act reveals that each of the three characters is radically different. They are connected by their futures, whether they are terminal or not. As the act ends, Joe and Maggie are beginning to talk, Agnes is struggling to connect to her mother, and Brian and Beverly are dancing.

Act Two

It is nearing evening. Joe is still coaxing Maggie to come into the cabin, Brian and Beverly are reminiscing, Mark is becoming frustrated by his lover's jollity, and Agnes is beginning to talk to the interviewer. As the act continues, cracks are shown in Brian’s brutal forthrightness about his illness and Mark's feelings about his impending death. Beverly provides some raw insight within her seemingly scattered exterior. Joe and Maggie continue to struggle to have a deeper conversation about their future. Agnes reveals a secret about her sister Claire. We learn that she died some years ago in an accident in Louisiana. Over the past two years, Agnes has been writing letters to her mother from her sister, and the interviewer presents her with some hard questions. More is learned about the characters' lives before they became ill, material that makes their current situation more poignant. By the end of the act, no moral conclusions have been drawn, no one has died, and no one is going to live forever. The audience thinks not about each person's impending death but what to do with this "moment" that each has to live.

== Productions ==
The Shadow Box premiered in a production of the Center Theatre Group at the Mark Taper Forum in Los Angeles in the 1975-1976 season, and it was directed by Gordon Davidson (artistic director of the Mark Taper Forum).

The play opened on Broadway on March 31, 1977 at the Morosco Theatre and closed on December 31, 1977, after 315 performances.

The play was directed by Gordon Davidson with scenery by Ming Cho Lee, costumes by Bill Walker, and lighting by Ronald Wallace. The cast featured Josef Sommer (Interviewer), Simon Oakland (Joe), Vincent Spano (Steve), Joyce Ebert (Maggie), Laurence Luckinbill (Brian), Mandy Patinkin (Mark), Patricia Elliott (Beverly), Rose Gregorio (Agnes), and Geraldine Fitzgerald (Felicity).

Mary Carver replaced Fitzgerald on April 30, 1977, and Clifton James replaced Oakland on May 23, 1977.

In 1993, a planned high school production of the play in Tucson, Arizona was cancelled due to the play's "language." Critics of the move charged that the play was being censored for its treatment of homosexuality. In response, actors including William Baldwin, Christopher Reeve, Mercedes Ruehl, Harry Hamlin, Blair Brown and Estelle Parsons staged a reading of the play in Tucson produced by People For the American Way.

== Film adaptation ==
Cristofer adapted the play for a television movie in 1980, directed by Paul Newman and co-produced by Newman and his daughter Susan. The cast featured John Considine (Interviewer), James Broderick (Joe), Valerie Harper (Maggie), Christopher Plummer (Brian), Ben Masters (Mark), Joanne Woodward (Beverly), Melinda Dillon (Agnes), and Sylvia Sidney (Felicity).

The film premiered at the Deauville Film Festival on September 9, 1980. It was won a Golden Globe for Best Motion Picture Made for Television, a Humanitas Prize for 90 minute Category and was nominated three Emmy Awards: Outstanding Drama Special, Teleplay adaption (Cristofer), and Director (Newman).

== Awards and nominations ==
Source: PlaybillVault

Awards

- 1977 Tony Award for Best Play
- 1977 Tony Award Direction of a Play (Gordon Davidson)
- 1977 Pulitzer Prize for Drama
- 1977 Clarence Derwent Award, Most Promising Female Performer (Rose Gregorio)

Nominations

- 1977 Drama Desk Award for Outstanding New American Play
- 1977 Drama Desk Award, Outstanding Featured Actress in a Play (Rose Gregorio, Joyce Ebert)
- 1977 Tony Award, Featured Actor in a Play (Laurence Luckinbill)
- 1977 Tony Award, Featured Actress in a Play (Rose Gregorio, Patricia Elliot)
