= Angel Baby (1961 film) =

1961 film by Paul Wendkos

- Directed by: Paul Wendkos; Hubert Cornfield (uncredited)
- Written by: Orin Borsten; Paul Mason; Samuel Roeca
- Based on: Jenny Angel; 1954 novel by Elsie Oakes Barber
- Produced by: Thomas F. Woods
- Starring: Salome Jens; George Hamilton; Mercedes McCambridge
- Cinematography: Jack Marta; Haskell Wexler
- Edited by: Betty J. Lane
- Music by: Wayne Shanklin
- Production company: Madera Productions
- Distributed by: Allied Artists Pictures Corporation
- Release date: May 14, 1961
- Running time: 97 minutes
- Country: United States
- Language: English

Angel Baby is a 1961 American Southern Gothic drama film directed by Paul Wendkos and starring Salome Jens, George Hamilton and Mercedes McCambridge. It was Burt Reynolds's film debut.

Wendkos called it "one of my favorite pictures, because I had a theme".

The song, "Jenny Angel", sung by George Hamilton, is played during the closing credits of the film.

== Plot ==
Angel Baby and her family live in the rural American South. She lost her ability to speak at age eight. Her mother catches her kissing Hoke, and chases him away. Worried about Angel's soul, they go to a tent revival where Paul Strand is preaching. He heals her muteness, urging her to say, "God", at first, then, "Lord God", and a prayer of thankfulness.

The next day, Angel believes that God has called her, so she decides to follow Paul and work in his ministry. She is given speaking lessons and a great deal of attention. Paul's wife, Sarah, is somewhat jealous. Paul's preaching method includes having provocatively-costumed women perform the parts of temptresses in the Bible, such as Jezebel and Delilah.

Increasingly attracted to Paul, Angel's devotion and passion is cemented when she is rescued by Paul after being attacked by Hoke for rejecting him due to her newfound piety. However, Paul's wife and several others see the end of the fight, and misunderstand Paul's intentions, although it happens that Paul is in love with Angel.

Angel begins her own traveling ministry (with the help of Ben and Molly Hays), but she is not attracting many followers nor many donations.

Noticing her beauty and potential, an unscrupulous businessman, Sam Wilcox, approaches Angel Baby to market his patent medicines. To restore her faith, he hires a few shills from the audience to be healed, despite the warnings of Angel's support team. When they see that the trick has empowered her, they remain silent. They "have a little nip", and head over to Paul and Sarah's to reveal this falsehood.

Paul remains dissatisfied with his marriage to Sarah, because it turns out that he was a choirboy who was led astray by her, molded into a prophet of her imagination. His faith at a low point, he leaves Sarah, ostensibly to set Angel on the right path.

Angel has become increasingly popular, drawing huge crowds, including Hoke, who vows that he will not stand in line to see her. He and his friends spy Paul approaching the revival tent.

At the front of the tent, because there are so many people trying to get in, they are assigned numbers. One man (with a lame leg and 13 children) is particularly bitter about this, yet manages to get in.

Paul tells Angel that he wants to marry her (and will be divorcing Sarah). This invigorates Angel's preaching. Meanwhile, Paul confronts Sam, who is drinking heavily in the parking lot, telling him that he must confess.

Things are going well in the tent until Sarah bursts in, shouts condemnation of Angel, and claims that the man in the wheelchair has been paid to fake a miracle. Hoke joins in the fray. The man in the wheelchair freaks out and leaves, which clearly demonstrates the falsehood, and a large fight ensues. As people flee, there is a particularly vivid shot of an upturned wheelchair wheel spinning as the crowd in the background runs around. The tent starts to fall. Sam tries to confess during the middle of the melee, but no one is listening. Eventually, the tent collapses.

Hoke approaches Angel, who has become mute again. She continues past him as if she cannot see nor hear him. Paul emerges from the tent after removing a large timber that has fallen on his wife.

Angel comes to a small store, where a husband and wife recognize her, and want her to heal their lame son. It seems she is not mute after all; she tells them that she cannot heal the child. Paul arrives, and watches as she performs a final miracle; while her faith in herself is destroyed, other people still believe.

== Cast ==
- George Hamilton as Paul Strand
- Mercedes McCambridge as Sarah Strand
- Salome Jens as "Angel Baby"
- Burt Reynolds as "Hoke" Adams
- Joan Blondell as Mollie Hays
- Henry Jones as Ben Hays
- Roger Clark as Sam Wilcox

== Production ==
The film is based on the 1954 novel, Jenny Angel. Film rights were bought by plastic surgeon, Dr. Robert Franklyn, for his wife, Vanessa Brown. After they got divorced, Franklyn sold the rights to the book to T. F. Woods of Madera Productions.

The film was originally developed with Columbia Pictures, but was sold to Allied Artists.

After appearing in Where the Boys Are, George Hamilton was determined to make "better, more serious movies", partly to impress the family of his girlfriend, Susan Kohner. He had to be loaned out from TD Productions, who had contracted the actor to make Crime and Punishment USA.

Filming began in April 1960, under the direction of Hubert Cornfield. Shortly into filming in Coral Gables, Florida, Cornfield fell ill with appendicitis, and Paul Wendkos replaced him. According to Wendkos, only "about two seconds" of footage shot by Cornfield remains in the final film.

Wendkos said, "I came down and found the company in utter chaos. Everybody was thoroughly demoralized, and I had to come in and pick up all the loose pieces, and performed an act of therapy more or less. I had a very strong approach to the material which made it all very simple, but allowed everyone to get a common grasp on the material. The concept of course was the corruption of innocence, at the core and very fundamental to the picture, and everybody immediately sparked to that theme, that concept, and it gave them strength that immediately resurrected the whole project."

Burt Reynolds said, "George Hamilton beat me up in the film. Does that tell you anything?"

== Reception ==
Variety criticized the film for "ponderous and heavyhanded melodramatics", saying that evangelism "is a topic that requires careful and serious scrutiny if it is to form the basis for valid, effective drama: It receives no such cogent consideration".

Sight and Sound called it "crisp, intelligent and compact, beautifully acted".

Filmink claimed "Hamilton is extremely good; co-star Burt Reynolds is terrific. The movie tries to do something smart, European even – doesn’t get there (the script is wonky) but it’s really interesting and worth watching."

The film was screened at the Venice Film Festival.

== See also ==
- List of American films of 1961
