= Frank Porretta =

American opera, musical, and concert singer

Frank Porretta Jr. (May 4, 1930, Detroit – April 23, 2015, Stamford, Connecticut) was an American tenor who had an active career performing in operas, musicals, and concerts from 1952 through 1971. He had a particularly fruitful relationship with the New York City Opera from 1956 to 1970 where he sang a highly diverse repertoire; including roles in new operas by composers Norman Dello Joio, Carlisle Floyd, Vittorio Giannini, and Robert Ward. For the NBC Opera Theatre he portrayed The Astronaut in the world premiere of Gian Carlo Menotti's Labyrinth.

Porretta also starred in several musicals at the Lincoln Center for the Performing Arts and the Los Angeles Civic Light Opera; notably performing on cast albums of The Great Waltz, The King and I and The Merry Widow. He made his only film appearance in the 1970 film Song of Norway in which he starred opposite Florence Henderson and Toralv Maurstad. After retiring from the stage in his early 40s, Porretta served as the choir director at St. John's Church in Darien, Connecticut, for more than 40 years.

== Early life and education ==
Born Francis Samuel Porretta II in Detroit, Porretta initially intended to become a doctor as his father and two brothers were all surgeons. He entered the University of Michigan (UM) as a pre-med major but transferred to the music school during his sophomore year to pursue studies in vocal performance. He graduated with a bachelor music degree from the UM in 1952. In 1954 he won the Grinnell Foundation–Detroit Grand Opera Association scholarship which provided him with the financial support he needed to pursue vocal studies with Eleanor McLellan in New York City.

== Singing career ==
Porretta began his music career as an officer in the United States Army where he served as a vocal soloist with the United States Army Band and a singer in their associated choir from 1952 to 1954. In 1956 he portrayed the First Court Crier in the world premiere of William Bergsma's The Wife of Martin Guerre at the Juilliard School. In 1957 he created the role of Panfilo in the world premiere of Carlos Chávez's The Visitors at Columbia University.

In 1956 Porretta made his professional opera debut at the New York City Opera (NYCO) as Frederic in the company's first performance of Mignon with Frances Bible in the title role and Beverly Sills as Philine. He remained a regular performer with the NYCO for the next fourteen years, performing such roles as Alfred in Die Fledermaus, Alfredo in La traviata, Apollo in L'Orfeo, Belmonte in The Abduction from the Seraglio, the Duke of Mantua in Rigoletto, Edgar Linton in Wuthering Heights, Frederic in The Pirates of Penzance, Lucentio in Vittorio Giannini's The Taming of the Shrew, Jolidon in The Merry Widow, Luigi in Il tabarro, Nanki-Poo in The Mikado, Pinkerton in Madama Butterfly, Ralph Rackstraw in H.M.S. Pinafore, Rinuccio in Gianni Schicchi, Sam Kaplan in Street Scene, the Sleepwalker in Louise, Steve in The Cradle Will Rock, and Vladimir in Prince Igor among others. He also created roles in several world premieres at the NYCO, including Bezano in Robert Ward's He Who Gets Slapped, the English sentry in Norman Dello Joio's The Triumph of St. Joan, Florindo in Giannini's The Servant of Two Masters, and Lucas Wardlaw in Floyd's The Passion of Jonathan Wade. He also appeared as the tenor soloist in Carl Orff's Carmina Burana with the company.

In addition to his work at the NYCO, Porretta made appearances as a guest artist with several opera companies in North America. In 1958 he made his debut at the Washington National Opera as Scaramuccio in Ariadne auf Naxos. That same year he appeared as Aronne in Rossini's Mosè in Egitto at Carnegie Hall with the American Opera Society. In 1959 he created the role of Micah in the world premiere of Abraham Ellstein's The Thief and the Hangman at Ohio University. He later reprised that role on television for a nationally broadcast performance on ABC on October 15, 1961. He also appeared on television in three operas with the NBC Opera Theatre, portraying Grigori–Dimitri in Boris Godunov (1961), Avito in The Love of Three Kings (1962) and The Astronaut in the world premiere of Menotti's Labyrinth (1963).

In the 1959/60 season Porretta appeared at the Pittsburgh Opera as Count Almaviva in The Barber of Seville. In 1963 he made his debut at the Canadian Opera Company as Don Ottavio in Don Giovanni. In 1964 he portrayed Alwa in Alban Berg's Lulu at the Opera Company of Boston under conductor Sarah Caldwell. He made his debut at the Vancouver Opera in 1966 portraying Rodolfo to Maria di Gerlando's Mimì in La bohème. In 1967 he performed Gerald in Lakmé at the Seattle Opera with Joan Sutherland in the title role. In 1968 he sang Alfredo to Heather Thomson's Violetta at the Edmonton Opera. In 1970 he portrayed Jimmy Mahogonny in the United States premiere of Rise and Fall of the City of Mahagonny at the Phyllis Anderson Theatre in New York. Other companies he sang leading roles with during his career were the Baltimore Opera, the Central City Opera, Opera Mobile, and the Philadelphia Lyric Opera Company among others.

Porretta also appeared in several musicals and operettas during his career. In 1964 he appeared in two productions presented by Music Theater of Lincoln Center: performing Lun Tha in The King and I and Jolidon in The Merry Widow; both of which were recorded for RCA Records. He performed in several productions at the Los Angeles Civic Light Opera, including Rikard Nordraak in Song of Norway (1962), Mr. Snow in Carousel (1963), Lun Tha in The King and I (1965), Schani in The Great Waltz (1965), Karl Franz in The Student Prince (1966), Alexander Dumas in Dumas and Son (1967), various parts in Musical Theater Cavalcade (1970), and the title role in Candide (1971). He also toured the West Coast in Candide and performed the role opposite Mary Costa as Cunegonde at the John F. Kennedy Center for the Performing Arts in 1971

In 1970 Poretta made his only film appearance in the musical film Song of Norway in which he once again portrayed Nordraak, this time opposite Florence Henderson and Toralv Maurstad. In 1957 he sang the role of Charlie in the studio cast recording of Brigadoon with Shirley Jones, Jack Cassidy, and Susan Johnson.

Porretta was also active as a concert artist with many notable symphony orchestras and music ensembles around the country. In 1960 he was the tenor soloist in the world premiere of George Balanchine's ballet Liebeslieder Walzer with the New York City Ballet. In 1962 he sang the title role in a concert performance of Rossini's Le comte Ory with the New York Philharmonic and conductor Thomas Schippers at Carnegie Hall. Another highlight of his concert work was singing Jaquino in Beethoven's Fidelio under the baton of Georg Solti with the Chicago Symphony Orchestra.

Since there has been made mention of two of Frank Jr’s children, both non singers on the level of their father, it should be mentioned that his tenor singing son, Frank the III, made at least one auspiciois forray into life as a operatic singer. One of which was his short career singing just across the square from the State Theater, Frank Jr’s house, at the Metropolitan Opera Co. in at least two tenor roles: Turiddu in Mascagni’s Cavaleria Rusticana and in Puccini’s Turandot, singing the role of Calaf.

== Later life and career ==
After retiring from the stage in his early 40s, Porretta worked as the choir director at St. John's Church in Darien, Connecticut, for more than 40 years. He occasionally would still perform in local theater events in Darien, including playing Fredrik Egerman in a production of Stephen Sondheim's A Little Night Music in 1980. He was married to soprano Roberta Porretta for 47 years. They had five children and seven grandchildren together. Two of their sons have successful careers in the performing arts: actor Matthew Porretta and opera singer Frank Porretta III. Their daughter Anna Porretta wrote for the television program Talk Soup. In 1997 Porretta made a guest appearance as Andrew McGregor on his son Matthew's television series The New Adventures of Robin Hood. He died on April 23, 2015, at Stamford Hospital at the age of 84.
