= Song of Norway (film) =

1970 film by Andrew L. Stone

- 1970 theatrical poster
- Directed by: Andrew L. Stone
- Written by: Andrew L. Stone
- Starring: Toralv Maurstad; Florence Henderson
- Cinematography: Davis Boulton
- Edited by: Virginia Stone
- Music by: Robert Wright; George Forrest, based on the music of Edvard Grieg
- Production companies: ABC Pictures; American Broadcasting Company
- Distributed by: Cinerama Releasing Corporation
- Release date: November 4, 1970
- Running time: 142 minutes
- Country: United States
- Language: English
- Budget: $3,625,000
- Box office: $7,900,000

Song of Norway is a 1970 American biographical drama musical film adaptation of the successful operetta of the same name, directed by Andrew L. Stone.

Like the play from which it derived, the film tells of the early struggles of composer Edvard Grieg and his attempts to develop an authentic Norwegian national music. It stars Toralv Maurstad as Grieg and features an international cast including Florence Henderson, Christina Schollin, Robert Morley, Harry Secombe, Oskar Homolka, Edward G. Robinson, and Frank Porretta (as Rikard Nordraak). Filmed in Super Panavision 70 by Davis Boulton and presented in single-panel Cinerama in some countries, it was an attempt to capitalize on the success of The Sound of Music, and was the first musical in Cinerama.

== Plot ==
Song of Norway begins with the young composer Edvard Grieg struggling to get his music noticed by other musicians or music producers in either Norway or Denmark. Grieg wants to write great lyrical music that represents his country. He gradually promotes his music with the help of composer and friend Rikard Nordraak, and cousin/wife/singer Nina Willemsun Grieg. During these early years (1860s), Norway was not especially looking for a composer of nationalist music based on Norwegian lyric songs. Other composers including Smetana, Dvorak and Liszt were beginning to develop a rich tradition of romantic music using the folk tunes of their homelands. In the film, Grieg complains about the lack of local interest in similar music for Norway. An old flame (the wealthy Therese Berg) helps subsidize a series of concerts for Grieg. He then applies for a travel grant, and his wife Nina befriends a local pianist (Mr. Krogstad) who then writes a letter to Hungarian composer and pianist Franz Liszt on Grieg's behalf. Grieg receives the grant, and leaves for Rome, while Nina remains in Norway. In Rome Grieg meets Norwegian playwright Henrik Ibsen and Franz Liszt. He holds numerous concerts and debuts his works. At this time Grieg also composes his famous piano concerto in A minor. Ibsen eventually asks Grieg to write the music for his play Peer Gynt. The film ends when Grieg returns home to Nina in Norway to continue his career. Of interest, the film correctly notes that Grieg's friend Rikard Nordraak, who dies while Grieg is away in Rome, composed the Norwegian national anthem.

== Cast ==
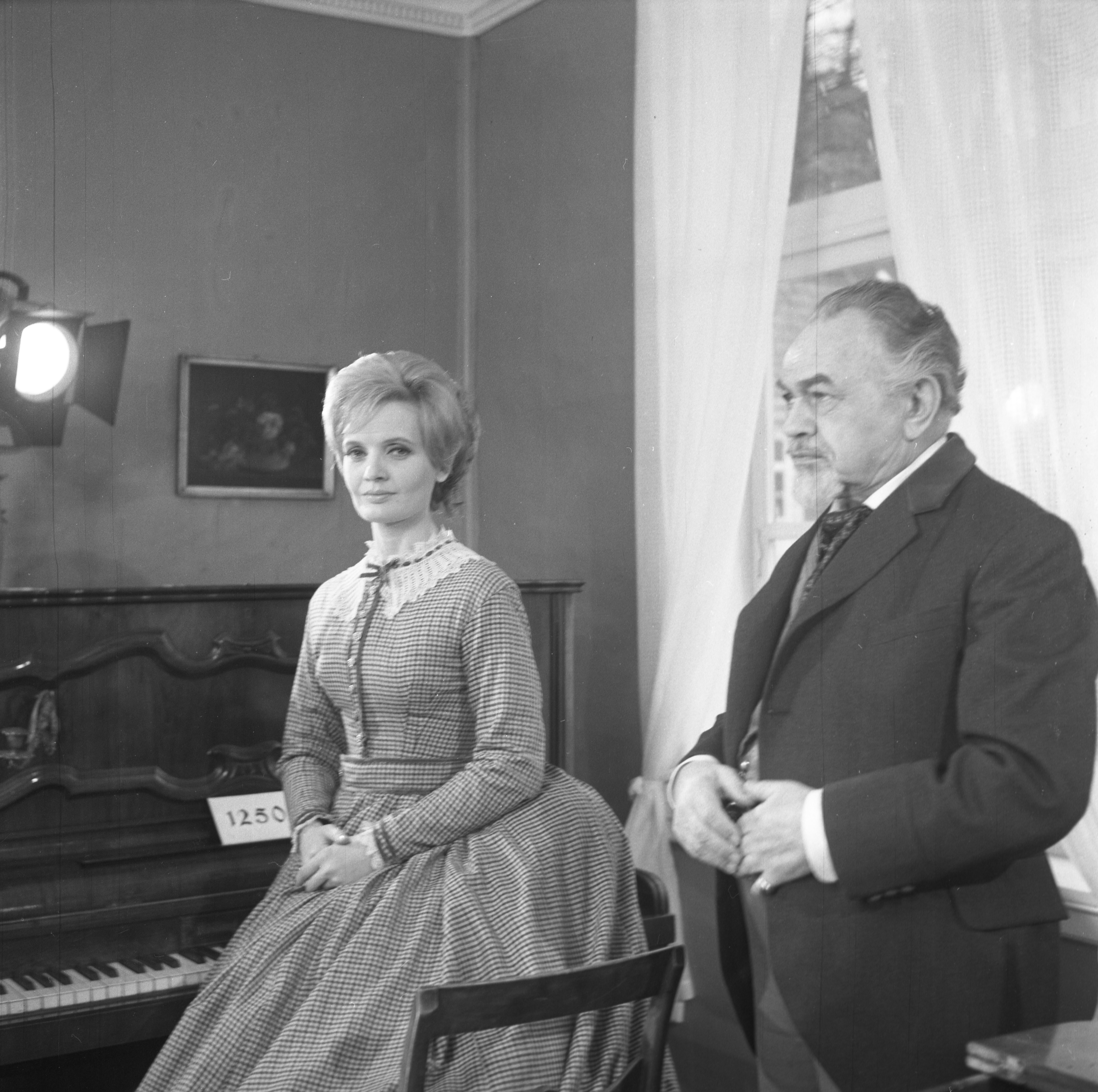
Florence Henderson and Edward G. Robinson on the set of Song of Norway (April 1969)

- Toralv Maurstad as Edvard Grieg
- Florence Henderson as Nina Grieg
- Christina Schollin as Therese Berg
- Frank Porretta as Rikard Nordraak
- Oskar Homolka as Engstrand
- Robert Morley as Berg
- Edward G. Robinson as Krogstad
- Harry Secombe as Bioernstjerne Bjoernson
- Elizabeth Larner as Mrs. Bjoernson
- Frederick Jaeger as Henrik Ibsen
- Henry Gilbert as Franz Liszt
- Richard Wordsworth as Hans Christian Andersen
- Bernard Archard as George Nordraak

== Production ==
Earl St John announced he would make the film in 1950.

== Release ==
Song of Norway had its premiere on November 4, 1970 at the Cinerama Theatre in New York and in Oslo.

== Reception ==
Song of Norway was conceived in the wake of successes like My Fair Lady and The Sound of Music, two films which had suggested to studios that a revival of full-scale musical films was in demand. The operetta from which the music was derived had run for over 1,000 performances on Broadway and in the West End.

However, the film version was a critical and commercial disaster. Filmgoers' appetites for a musical revival had been completely misjudged, and it ultimately was to join other box-office failures of the same period, such as Darling Lili, Mame, Paint Your Wagon, and Lost Horizon. Initially, box office prospects seemed promising with advance sales of $225,000 in New York and grossing $53,000 in its opening week from two theatres in New York and Toronto. In Britain, it was the most popular "reserved ticket" film of 1971. But it only went on to earn rentals of $4.4 million in the United States and Canada and $3.5 million in other countries, recording an overall loss of $1,075,000.

Critics were virtually unanimously negative on its release, observing its imitation of The Sound of Music and its generally poor production despite obvious expense. In The New Yorker, Pauline Kael wrote: "The movie is of an unbelievable badness; it brings back clichés you didn’t know you knew - they’re practically from the unconscious of moviegoers." Vincent Canby in The New York Times wrote that the film "is no ordinary movie kitsch, but a display to turn Guy Lombardo livid with envy," adding that "the film, conceived as a living postcard, is so full of waterfalls, blossoms, lambs, glaciers, folk dancers, mountains, children, suns, fjords and churches, that it raises kitsch to the status of a kind of art, not without its own peculiar integrity and crazy fascination." Kathleen Carroll of the New York Daily News gave it two stars out of four, writing that "Edvard Grieg may well have had his struggles as a young composer but he'd have to sit through the movie based on his life to know real depression. For The Song of Norway, at the Cinerama, is one big sour note. What has been done to the once charming operetta (it was first performed on Broadway in 1944) is almost too terrible to describe and it is particularly infuriating to those of us who still believe in the preservation of movie musicals." Gene Siskel of the Chicago Tribune gave the film half of one star out of four writing: "The fjords aren't exactly alive with the sound of Grieg thanks to a disastrous screenplay by Andrew Stone who finds it more convenient to photograph a mountain than to write intelligent dialog." Charles Champlin of the Los Angeles Times called the film "inoffensive but unsatisfying" and compared it unfavorably to The Sound of Music, which "had a strong narrative line and generated a good deal of suspense. It's not Grieg's fault he wasn't chased by Nazis, of course, but such trials as there were in his life seem either lacklustre or inappropriate to a family musical." Critics also cited the uninspired cinematography, clumsy editing and a ham-fisted insertion of cartoon trolls (supervised by former Disney animator Jack Kinney). These flaws seemed only amplified by their presentation in Super-Panavision and Cinerama. Gary Arnold of The Washington Post wrote that the film had "next to no plot" and "beautiful scenery or not, people are going to lose interest as slowly but surely as they do when watching the neighbors' slides of their trip to Europe."

The press screening of the film in London was derailed multiple times by power outages. As related by Felix Barker in the Evening News:

If nothing else, Song of Norway will stay in my memory as the only film I have seen on the trot in three different cinemas.

My viewing of the story of the composer, Edvard [Grieg], started at the Casino at 10:30 a.m. [GMT]. Just time to revel in the marvelous scenery of the fiords when—blackout!

So, after coffee, a walk, and an early lunch, a few of us went to the small Rank Private cinema in Wardour street, where lighting was on at 2:45 [p.m. GMT] to see Toralv Maurstad as [Grieg] fighting his way out of poverty. But at 3:50 [p.m. GMT]—blackout!

But you can't keep a good composer (or a resourceful film company) down. There was light on the other side of Wardour Street, so we trooped across to see [Grieg] in Rome, happily agreeing (somewhat against historical fact) to compose music for Ibsen's Peer Gynt.

When we came out it was 5:55 p.m. [GMT]!

Similar stories were related by Alexander Walker of the Evening Standard and Derek Malcolm of The Guardian, the latter of whom said that he was "grateful for the breaks", opining that "it is, scenery aside, not very hot", described the acting as being "strictly of the I-can-sing-and-dance-so-why-should-I? variety", and overall concluded that "it is one of those films, hopelessly out of the current fashion, riddled with the inanities of the most wooden kind of screen tra-la-las but rather fun the same."

Critics' views were echoed by cast members. Florence Henderson said Andrew Stone "approached scenes quite literally and without a lot of imagination". Harry Secombe called it a film "you could take the kids to see... and leave them there."

In the music video for David Bowie's 2013 song "Where Are We Now?", Bowie is seen wearing a shirt referencing the film, which in 1969 his then-girlfriend, Hermione Farthingale, had appeared in, leaving him in order to do so.
