= The Crucible (opera) =

1961 opera by Robert Ward

- Opera by Robert Ward
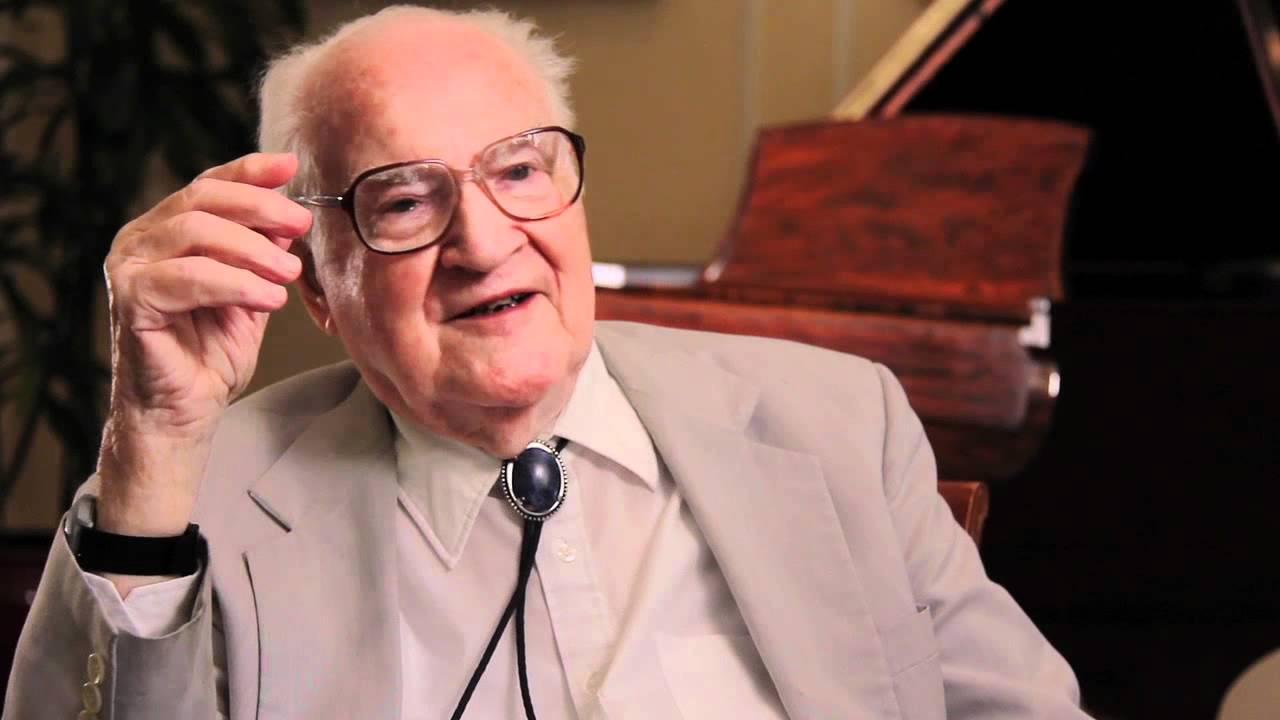
- The composer in 2011
- Librettist: Bernard Stambler
- Language: English
- Based on: The Crucible by Arthur Miller
- Premiere: October 26, 1961; New York City Opera

The Crucible is a 1961 English-language opera written by Robert Ward, based on the 1953 play The Crucible by Arthur Miller. The opera won both the 1962 Pulitzer Prize for Music and the New York Music Critics Circle Citation. The libretto was lightly adapted from Miller's text by Bernard Stambler.

Arthur Miller was involved in selecting Ward, who received a commission from the New York City Opera to write the piece. It is among the most performed operas by an American composer.

== Performance history ==
The Crucible premiered on 26 October 1961 at the New York City Opera (NYCO), with Chester Ludgin as John Proctor, and Norman Treigle as the Reverend John Hale. The production was staged by Allen Fletcher, used scenery designed by Paul Sylbert, and costumes designed by Ruth Morley. The work was next performed in student productions at the University of California, Los Angeles and The Hartt School in West Hartford, Connecticut in 1964. The opera was mounted by the San Francisco Opera for the first time on June 22, 1965 with much of the same cast as the NYCO production. In 1968 the NYCO revived the production, It has since been staged by the Lake George Opera (1966), the Seattle Opera (1968), the Pennsylvania Opera Theater (1989), Central City Opera (1998) and the Tulsa Opera (1995) and Glimmerglass Festival (2016). In April 2020, "The Crucible" was scheduled to be performed by the University of Kentucky Opera Theatre. The Opera was a produced by The Washington Opera in December 1999. The new production was directed by Australian Bruce Beresford best known for his work on the film Driving Miss Daisey. Musical Director and Conductor was Daniel Beckwith. Mr. Ward attended the company's tech week and provided much appreciated input.

The German premiere in 1963 at Staatstheater Wiesbaden was received with harsh criticism. In 2015 the film director Hugh Hudson made his debut as an opera director with The Crucible at Staatstheater Braunschweig. In 2001, the opera was staged in the City Theatre in Ústí nad Labem, Czech Republic, with Robert Ward conducting.

The Crucible had its Australian premiere on 10 October 2008 at the Western Australian Academy of Performing Arts, forty-seven years after its world premiere. It was performed by senior opera-students, conducted by Justin Bischof and directed by Leith Taylor.

The Crucible was performed at the University of South Carolina in the fall of 2022. University College Opera performed the UK premiere of The Crucible in March 2024 at the Bloomsbury Theatre, conducted by Matt Scott Rogers and directed by Eleanor Strutt.

In 2024, the alternative opera company, Opera in the Pines, presented The Crucible as an immersive, on-site production in a "legendary haunted church" (The Old Red Church) in Standish, Maine.

== Roles ==
Role	Voice type	Premiere Cast, October 26, 1961 (Conductor: – Emerson Buckley)
John Proctor	baritone	Chester Ludgin
Elizabeth Proctor	mezzo-soprano	Frances Bible
Abigail Williams	soprano	Patricia Brooks
Judge Danforth	tenor	Ken Neate
Reverend John Hale	bass	Norman Treigle
Reverend Samuel Parris	tenor	Norman Kelley
Tituba	contralto	Débria Brown
Rebecca Nurse	contralto	Eunice Alberts
Giles Corey	tenor	Maurice Stern
Mary Warren	soprano	Joy Clements
Ann Putnam	soprano	Mary LeSawyer
Thomas Putnam	baritone	Paul Ukena
Ezekiel Cheever	tenor	Harry Theyard
Sarah Good	soprano	Joan Kelm
Betty Parris	mezzo-soprano	Joyce Ebert
Mercy Lewis	soprano	Nancy Roy
Bridget Booth	soprano	Beverly Evans
Susanna Walcott	contralto	Helen Guile
Ruth Putnam	soprano	Lorna Ceniceros
Martha Sheldon	soprano	Elizabeth Schwering
Hathorne	bass	John Macurdy

== Story ==
The play takes place during the 1692 Salem witch trials. The Arthur Miller play on which it was based was written as an allegory for McCarthyism and the Red Scare, which occurred in the United States in the 1950s. Miller was himself questioned by the House Committee on Un-American Activities in 1956.

Several women and men in the town are accused of witchcraft by a group of young girls led by Abigail Williams. Her jealousy of John Proctor's wife, Elizabeth, leads Abigail to accuse Elizabeth of witchcraft. John himself is eventually accused and hangs rather than recant, saying he can't dirty his name and stands up for what he believes.

== Discography ==
- Brooks, Bible, Ludgin, Macurdy; Buckley, 1962 (CRI)
- D’Eramo, Weishoff, Rogers, Karkari, Collins, Kayaalp; Murray, Benevento, Whiteman, Capozzo, Downey, Jones; Purchase Symphony, State University of New York at Purchase Hugh Murphy. Albany Records Troy 1656/57 (2)
