= Maurice Stern =

American operatic tenor and sculptor

Maurice Stern, also known by his early stage name Mauro Lampi, is an American operatic tenor and sculptor. He graduated from the Eastman School of Music. He made his debut at the New York City Opera as The Emperor Altuom in Giacomo Puccini's Turandot, and received a laudatory solo review by Eric Salzman of The New York Times for that small role.

Stern progressed from small character parts to the lyric tenor roles of Don Ottavio, Belmonte, the Duke in Rigoletto, Roméo, Rodolfo, Pinkerton, and Cavaradossi. He then played great dramatic tenor roles, including Otello, Radamès, Canio, Don José, Calàf, Manrico, Don Alvaro, Andrea Chénier, Samson, Dick Johnson, Bacchus, Lohengrin and Tannhäuser. During his international career, he also studied with Franco Corelli in New York City.

Stern performed in opera houses in the United States, Canada, Mexico, South America, Europe and China. He received critical acclaim for his singing, his acting and character delineation, and his portrait sculpture and works on paper.

Stern now performs as a duo with his third wife, Molly, and continues his work in the visual arts.

Stern is the father of singer Jennifer Rush.

== Life and career ==
=== Early studies ===
Stern's vocal training began at age 14 in New York City with Eduardo Battente, a tenor graduate of the Naples Conservatory. Stern learned the roles of The Duke in Rigoletto; Nemorino in Don Pasquale and Edgardo in Lucia di Lammermoor. Stern attended the High School of Music and Art, now known as Fiorello H. LaGuardia High School of Music & Art and Performing Arts. During his years there, he performed regularly as a super (non-singing extra) at the Metropolitan Opera.

At 18, Stern performed the leading role of Mr. Scratch (The Devil) in the High School of Music and Art's production of The Devil and Daniel Webster at Hunter College's Sylvia and Danny Kaye Playhouse, with composer Douglas Moore attending. Moore expressed his astonishment that such a young singer could interpret the role so powerfully. Stern received the Voice Award upon graduating.

While at Eastman School of Music in Rochester NY Stern married fellow vocal student Barbara Cagnazzo, an aspiring soul singer. He lived with his young wife's Cagnazzo family for 5 years in East Rochester before moving to NYC. During and after the Korean War, when he was drafted into the U.S. Army and stationed in Germany, On returning to the U.S., he continued his studies at the Eastman School of Music During his 5 years in Rochester, NY Stern became a father to 2 of his 4 children.

He received the McCurdy Scholarship for Juniors. He also won the "You Can Be a Star Series" Contest sponsored by WHAM-TV in Rochester, whose prize was an automobile, a screen test in Hollywood, and the opportunity to meet celebrity personalities Jack Benny, Jimmy Durante and Betty White.

Stern's parents were European emigrants of varied ethnicity. He speaks five languages.

==== New York City Opera ====
Stern received a scholarship from the Henry Street Settlement to study with the Metropolitan Opera soprano Rose Bampton and her husband, conductor Wilfrid Pelletier. Stern performed the role of Spoleta in an NBC production of Puccini's Tosca with Pelletier conducting. An audition for the New York City Opera, arranged by Bampton, began Stern's operatic career.

Among the many roles he sang at New York City Opera were Porcus in Jeanne d'Arc au bûcher by Arthur Honegger; Don Basilio in The Marriage of Figaro and Tanchum the Madman in the world premiere of The Golem, by Abraham Ellstein. In the role of Tanchum Miles Kastendieck of the New York Journal-American noted "Maurice Stern's madman topped all the characterizations, for he acts and sings with complete conviction." Paul Henry Lang of New York Herald Tribune wrote, "Maurice Stern acted and sang the role of the madman with convincing force." Winthrop Sargeant of The New Yorker stated, "Maurice Stern, as a ghetto madman, made outstanding contributions …with his exceptional abilities as an actor."

Stern sang the role of Giles Corey in the world premiere of The Crucible (opera) by Robert Ward at the New York City Opera, and also in its first recording. Irving Kolodin noted in The Saturday Review that "Maurice Stern was a striking Giles Corey". Stern performed regularly with the company through 1963 and later returned as guest in the roles of Robespierre in the American premieres of Danton's Death by Gottfried von Einem and The Inspector General by Werner Egk. He also appeared as the Shepherd in Oedipus Rex by Igor Stravinsky. Further roles in Douglas Moore operas included: An Old Silver Miner in The Ballad of Baby Doe; The Lecturer at the National Gallery in the world premiere of The Wings of the Dove at the New York City Opera, and a repeat performance of Mr. Scratch in The Devil and Daniel Webster at Kansas City Lyric Theater.

Stern appeared as Captain James Lee in the world premiere of Deseret, an opera by Leonard Kastle based on an episode in the life of the Mormon prophet Brigham Young. Both the world premiere with the Memphis Opera Theatre and later performances with the Pasadana Opera Company were conducted by Anton Coppola and directed by Leonard Kastle.

As character tenor, Stern performed the roles of The Steersman in Der Fliegende Hollander with Birgit Nilsson and Ramon Vinay at the Pittsburgh Opera, directed by Tito Capobianco; Gaston in La Traviata with Joan Sutherland at Philadelphia Lyric Opera; Remendado in Carmen with Jon Vickers at Philadelphia Lyric Opera; Tybalt in Roméo et Juliette with Franco Corelli at Philadelphia Lyric Opera; and Trin in La Fanciulla del West with Franco Corelli at Philadelphia Lyric Opera with Anton Guadagno conducting. It was at this time that Maestro Guadagno suggested that Stern change his professional operatic name to "Mauro Lampi."

Under his newly adopted stage name Stern performed the role of Rustighello at the debut of Montserrat Caballé in Donizetti's Lucrezia Borgia at Carnegie Hall. When Caballé appeared again at Carnegie Hall later that year in Donizetti's Roberto Devereux, Stern performed the role of Lord Cecil. Both performances at Carnegie Hall were commercially recorded.

In 1962 Stern was a recipient of the Ford Foundation Grant for Opera Singers. He began singing leading tenor roles nationally in opera houses around the United States, such as Rodolfo in La Boheme with The Syracuse Opera Company and with Arlington Opera, Roméo in Roméo et Juliette with Seattle Opera; Don Ottavio in Don Giovanni with Dayton Opera and Toledo Opera; Pinkerton in Madama Butterfly with Connecticut Opera, The Duke in Rigoletto with Hartford Opera, the title role in Faust with Connecticut Opera, and Gabriel von Eisenstein in Die Fledermaus with Dayton Opera, Columbus Opera and the Opera Guild of Greater Miami.

==== Europe ====
Stern's second career in Europe began when he was engaged as leading tenor in Städtische Bühnen Flensburg from 1969 to 1971. His second wife Rita Loving and his three children moved with him from New York City to Flensburg, Germany. There, he sang the title roles in Lohengrin and Andrea Chenier, Cavaradossi in Tosca, Radames in Aida, The Duke in Rigoletto and Belmonte in Die Entführung aus dem Serail.

This was followed by an engagement at the Hessisches Staatstheater Wiesbaden where he sang Pinkerton in Madama Butterfly, Rodolfo in La Boheme, Don José in Carmen, Alfredo in La Traviata, the title role in Xerxes (Serse), Barinkay in Der Zigeunerbaron, Hans in The Bartered Bride, Belmonte in Die Entführung aus dem Serail, The Singer in Der Rosenkavalier and Rinuccio in Gianni Schicchi.

During this time he made guest appearances at the Oper Frankfurt as Rodolfo in La Boheme; at Stadttheater Klagenfurt as Hans in The Bartered Bride; at the Badisches Staatstheater Karlsruhe as Pinkerton in Madama Butterfly and The Duke in Rigoletto; and at Theater der Stadt Koblenz as Cavaradossi in Tosca.

==== Voice professor at the University of Washington ====
In 1973, Stern joined the Voice Faculty at the University of Washington in Seattle, where he met his future third wife, Molly Hogan, then a student pianist at the university. He gave many solo concert performances at the university and appeared as tenor soloist in Handel's Messiah with the Detroit Symphony under Paul Freeman, the Verdi Requiem with the Honolulu Symphony under Robert LaMarchina, and in numerous concerts with the University Symphony Orchestra under Samuel Krachmalnick.

He appeared as Manrico in Il Trovatore at the Nevada Opera and in the title role of Andrea Chenier at the Houston Grand Opera, indicating that his voice was leaning toward a dramatic tenor.

=== International career ===
==== Dramatic tenor roles ====
In 1979 Stern moved back to Europe using his earlier stage name, Mauro Lampi, to sing the role of Calaf in Turandot and the title role of Tannhäuser at the Landestheater Linz in Linz, Austria. The next season, as Maurice Stern, he became a member of the Deutsche Oper am Rhein in Düsseldorf, Germany (Opernhaus Düsseldorf) where he premiered the title role of Otello in a new production under the baton of Maestro Alberto Erede. He also performed the role in Theater Duisburg. The Neue Ruhr Zeitung Duisburg noted that "Maurice Stern gives OTELLO greatness and stature, in combination with excitement and expressive singability of his dark-toned tenor voice". Otello became a staple of Stern's repertoire. He also performed it in the German theaters of Musiktheater im Revier, Theater Lübeck and Theater Augsburg.

Stern appeared in a production of Otello in Montréal. He sang "Dio, mi potevi scagliar," which resulted in L'Ôpèra de Montréal engaging Stern to sing seven performances of Otello in a televised production with Alfredo Silipigni conducting and Antoine Vitez directing.

Stern was called upon to sing Otello at The Kentucky Opera, replacing James King who withdrew because of illness. Sir Alexander Gibson conducted the performances. The critical response to Stern's portrayal of Otello was enthusiastic: "He managed Otello's progress through jealousy to the edge of madness movingly, and his entire performance was heightened by his eager attention to every possibility for emotional nuance."

Additional roles that Stern performed at the Deutsche Oper am Rhein included: Don Alvaro in La Forza del Destino, Canio in Pagliacci, Porcus in Jeanne d'Arc au bûcher by Arthur Honegger and Alfred in Die Fledermaus under the stage direction of Otto Schenk.

Stern sang the role of Canio at the Frankfurt Opera in Germany and in Belgium at De Vlaamse Opera in Antwerp, which then toured the production to Ghent and Brugges. In America, he portrayed Canio at the Michigan Opera Theatre opposite the Nedda of Diana Soviero, again with the Dayton Opera, National Grand Opera, Brevard Festival and in Charleston, West Virginia.

Stern's repertoire included Radames in Aida, which he performed in several productions of the Deutsche Staatsoper Berlin opposite Anna Tomowa-Sintow as Aida; at De Vlaamse Opera in Antwerp, Belgium opposite Livia Budai as Amneris; followed by performances at the Norwegian National Opera, with Giancarlo del Monaco directing. Other engagements with Stern as Radames followed at the Austin Lyric Opera, Taipei National Opera; Opera/Columbus and the Miami Greater Opera Association with the Aida of Alessandra Marc.

Stern appeared as Calaf in Turandot opposite Olivia Stapp as Turandot at the Teatro de la Opera, San Juan, Puerto Rico. In 1985 he sang the role of Dick Johnson in Puccini's La Fanciulla del West at Gian Carlo Menotti's Festival dei Due Mondi in Charleston, South Carolina. The opera was directed by Bruce Beresford. The production was then taken to Spoleto, Italy and the premiere was televised by Radiotelevisione Italiana (RAI). He later performed the role of Dick Johnson at Opera/Columbus opposite Carol Neblett as Minnie.

Stern sang Samson in Samson et Dalila at the Utah Opera in Salt Lake City. He was later engaged by the Metropolitan Opera as a cover for Plácido Domingo for the role of Samson in the Metropolitan's new production of Samson et Dalila.

Other roles Stern performed were Manrico in Il Trovatore at the Teatro Teresa Carreño in Caracas, Venezuela which was broadcast for television; the same role at the Austin Lyric Opera; Don José in Carmen in Mexico City, Querétaro and Toluca with Enrique Batiz conducting; Turrídu in Cavalleria Rusticana in Reykjavík, Iceland; Cavaradossi in Tosca in Winterthur, Switzerland and in the French cities of Perpignan and Sète; and Gabriel von Eisenstein in Die Fledermaus in the Italian cities of Bolzano, Trieste, Bregenz, and Riva del Garda.

In 1991, Stern returned to Seattle to sing Bacchus in a production of Ariadne auf Naxos at the Seattle Opera with Hermann Michael conducting.

=== Sculptor and graphic artist ===
On the long bus tours around the country with New York City Opera, Stern started sculpting busts of fellow singers. Gradually, his repertoire expanded to include other personalities, such as the former director of New York City Opera, John Simon White, and conductor Felix Popper.

Between his graduation from Eastman School of Music and after divorcing his first wife Stern's roommates were Dustin Hoffman and Robert Duvall. Stern sculpted portraits of both. Hoffman's sculpture was displayed at the opening of The Graduate and also featured in Life magazine. Stern sculpted continuously and prolifically throughout his career as an opera singer. He sculpted family and friends. His sculpting provided the Stern family with a second income, as Stern was commissioned for portrait work in Flensburg, Germany.

Stern has received awards both for his portrait sculptures and his works on paper. He is a member of Audubon Artists, Allied Artists of America, The American Artists Professional League, The National Sculpture Society, and his work has been featured in "The Signature" magazine of The American Society of Portrait Artists. He has presented one-man shows at the Cornish Gallery in Seattle; in Germany at the Flensburger Stadtstheater in Flensburg and at the Atelier Moering in Wiesbaden.
