= Requiem (Delius) =

Orchestral work by Frederick Delius

Frederick Delius, 1907

The Requiem by Frederick Delius was written between 1913 and 1916, and first performed in 1922. It is set for soprano, baritone, double chorus and orchestra, and is dedicated "To the memory of all young artists fallen in the war". The Requiem is Delius's least-known major work, not being recorded until 1968 and having received only seven performances worldwide by 1980.

== Background ==
The reasons why Delius, an avowed atheist, started work on a Requiem, a decidedly Christian (specifically Catholic) form, are obscure. (A Mass of Life from 1905 also has a title suggestive of religion, but with an apparently anti-religious text.) He started work on the Requiem in 1913, after a holiday in Norway. The dedication "To the memory of all young artists fallen in the war" was clearly not in Delius's mind at the outset, as there was no war happening at that time. He had substantially completed the work by 26 October 1914, barely ten weeks after the start of the First World War. Prior to the outbreak of the war, both Henry Wood and Sir Thomas Beecham had shown early interest in presenting the Requiem during the latter part of the 1914 season. The war put paid to those plans, and Delius used the opportunity to make some minor revisions. By 15 March 1916 he was able to tell Philip Heseltine that it was completely finished.

Delius's nephew was killed on active service not long before the war ended but the dedication was already appended at the end of the score in the spring of 1918.

The work lasts a little over half an hour. It is in two parts and five sections. The chorus appears in every section, along with either the soprano or baritone soloist. The soloists do not sing together until the final section:

- Our days here are as one day (chorus, baritone)
- Hallelujah (chorus, baritone)
- My beloved whom I cherish was like a flower (baritone, chorus)
- I honour the man who can love life, yet without base fear can die (soprano, chorus)
- The snow lingers yet on the mountains (baritone, soprano, chorus)

There are some uncertainties surrounding the text. It seems that Delius did some of the early work himself, but his German Jewish friend Heinrich Simon contributed substantially in putting it together; so substantially, in fact, that he considered himself its true author and felt entitled to a royalty payment. Simon was the owner and editor of the Frankfurter Zeitung, and also a political economist, writer and translator, art historian, musicologist and practising musician. How he and Delius became acquainted is not recorded. The text does not literally quote any specific author, but is derived in spirit from the writings of Friedrich Nietzsche and Arthur Schopenhauer, while also redolent of William Shakespeare, the Bible, and the text of Gustav Mahler's Das Lied von der Erde. At one point, "Hallelujahs" are mingled with Arabic invocations to Allah. The published score makes no mention of the author, and Heinrich Simon's involvement only became generally acknowledged in the 1970s. Thomas Hemsley, the baritone soloist in the 1965 Liverpool performance, described the words as "a bit embarrassing, seeming to be rather a poor, second-hand imitation of Nietzsche".

Delius himself described the Requiem as non-religious; his working title until shortly before its first performance was "Pagan Requiem". Portions of the text appear to be critical of religion and its followers. These other-than-Christian associations caused the commentators of the day to spurn it as "anti-Christian", and its pantheism did not win the hearts of those who were still suffering the loss of loved ones in the First World War. The music critic H. C. Colles wrote, "Its words are little more than a dry rationalistic tract". The mingling of 'Hallelujahs' with 'Allah II Allah' was "introduced apparently to suggest the equal futility of all the religious war-cries of the world", and "the Delius standpoint is, as a whole, more arid than that of the most conventional 'religious' music, because a negation can generate no common impulse and arouse no enthusiasms."

In 1918 Delius had written "I don't think that I have ever done better", but even his greatest supporters, Sir Thomas Beecham, Philip Heseltine and Eric Fenby, were unimpressed with the work when first exposed to it, and for the most part remained so. Beecham expounded on what he saw as its failings in his book on Delius. Fenby initially described it as "the most depressing choral work I know", but he later came to see its merits. He wrote in a 1981 reprint of his 1936 book Delius as I Knew Him, "This musical expression, in the Requiem, of Delius' courageous attitude to life in rejecting organized faiths may well be rated by future generations as second only to the Danish Arabesque as one of his most characteristic and commendable masterpieces."

The first performance in London used an English translation of the German text by Philip Heseltine, who was brought into the project when Ernest Newman declined Delius's request. Heseltine's heart was not in a project he did not like or believe in, and this further reduced any chance of the Requiem being received in a positive light. The work was first published in 1921.

Heinrich Simon escaped Hitler's anti-semitism by migrating to the United States in 1934 but was murdered at the instigation of the Nazis in Washington, D.C. in 1941. He wrote a biography of Delius, but it was never published.

== Performances and recordings ==
The premiere performance of Frederick Delius's Requiem was in the Queen's Hall, London on 23 March 1922, conducted by Albert Coates. The soprano was Amy Evans and the baritone was Norman Williams. It was the last concert of the season, and it concluded with Beethoven's "Choral" Symphony. Amy Evans sang again in the Beethoven, but the baritone was Herbert Heyner.

Its continental premiere was in Frankfurt, Germany just over six weeks later on 1 May 1922, in the composer's presence. The conductor was Oscar van Pander (1883–1968), a music critic and journalist.

Its next performance was 28 years later, on 6 November 1950 in Carnegie Hall, New York City. The Collegiate Chorale and the National Orchestra Association were conducted by William Johnson, and the soloists were Inez Manier and Paul Ukena. In the same program was Schubert's "Unfinished" Symphony, the opening theme of which was quoted by Delius at the start of the Requiem.

Fifteen more years elapsed before the next performance – only the second in the United Kingdom – on 9 November 1965, by the Royal Liverpool Philharmonic Orchestra under Charles Groves, with Heather Harper and Thomas Hemsley as the soloists.

It returned to London in 1968, with the Royal Philharmonic Orchestra, Royal Choral Society, Heather Harper and John Shirley-Quirk, at the Royal Albert Hall. Sir Malcolm Sargent was to have conducted, but he had died in 1967 and Meredith Davies was called in in his place. The first recording was made shortly afterwards, using these same forces.

By 1980 there had been two more performances in the United States (Ann Arbor, Michigan and New York), as well as one in Greenville, Delaware, with organ, harp and percussion replacing the full orchestra.

Another recording was made in 1996 and released in 1997, with Peter Coleman-Wright, Rebecca Evans, the Bournemouth Symphony Orchestra, the Waynflete Singers and the Bournemouth Chorus, under Richard Hickox.

== Orchestration ==
Delius employs the following instruments in his orchestra:

- 3 flutes (3rd also piccolo), 2 oboes, English horn, bass oboe, 3 clarinets in B♭, bass clarinet in B♭, 3 bassoons, sarrusophone in C (or contrabassoon), 6 horns in F, 3 trumpets in C, 3 trombones, tuba, timpani, percussion (glockenspiel, triangle, snare drum, bass drum, cymbals), celesta, harp, strings.

A double chorus sings with solo soprano and solo baritone.
