= Salome Jens =

American actress (born 1935)

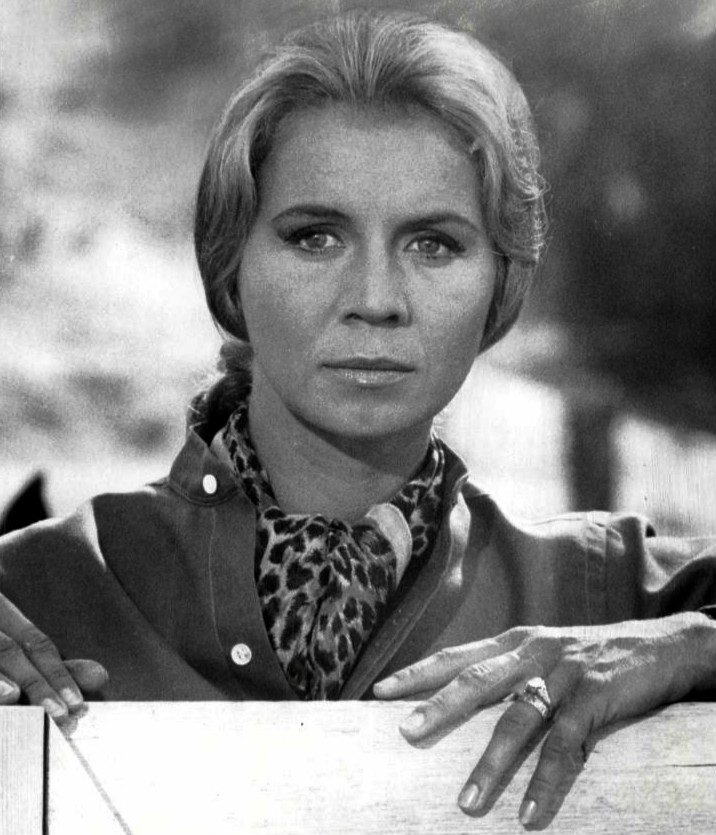
- Jens in a publicity photo for Stoney Burke (1962)
- Born: May 8, 1935 (age 91); Milwaukee, Wisconsin, U.S.
- Occupations: Actress, dancer
- Years active: 1956–present
- Spouse(s): Ralph Meeker (m. 1962; div. 1964) Lee Leonard (m. 1966; div. 1973)

Salome Jens (born May 8, 1935) is an American dancer and actress of stage, film and television. She is also known for portraying the Female Changeling on Star Trek: Deep Space Nine (1994–1999).

== Early years ==
Jens was born in Milwaukee, Wisconsin, and named after her Polish-born mother, Salomea. She briefly studied at the University of Wisconsin–Madison and Northwestern University, majoring in acting, then moved to New York, worked as a secretary, became a dance student of Martha Graham, and studied acting at HB Studio.

== Career ==
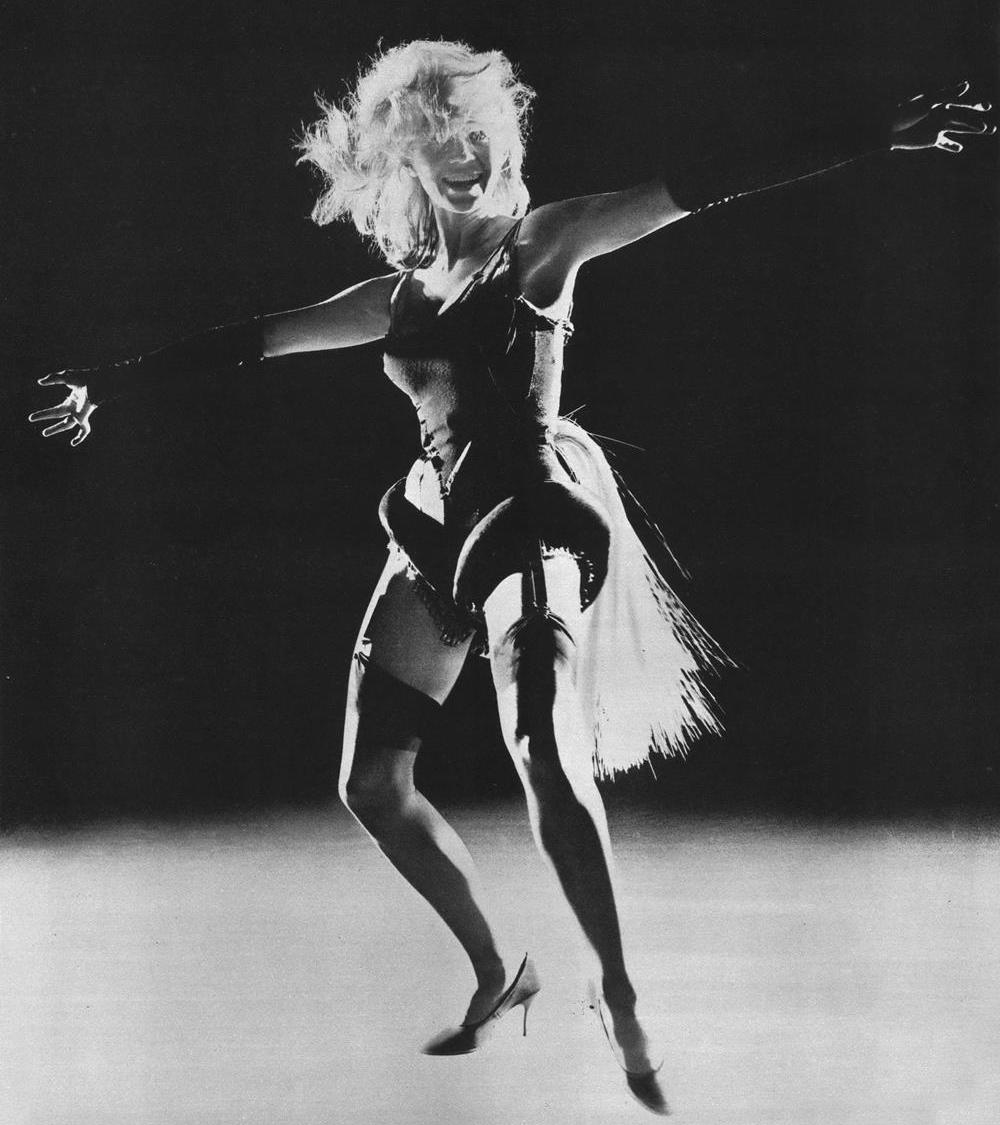
Jens in an off-Broadway production of The Balcony, c. 1961

Jens appeared in the role of the thief in the New York premiere production of Jean Genet's The Balcony. She earned excellent reviews playing Josie in A Moon for the Misbegotten at New York's Circle in the Square Theatre in the late 1960s, and she appeared in Antony and Cleopatra with the American Shakespeare Theatre company in 1972.

Jens first appeared on film as the titular character in Terror from the Year 5000 (1958), which was later featured in the eighth season of Mystery Science Theater 3000. Her other notable film roles occurred in Angel Baby (1961), in which she played the title role (the closing credits read, "Introducing Salome Jens"); The Fool Killer (1965); Seconds (1966); Me, Natalie (1969); Savages (1972); The Boy Who Talked to Badgers (1975); Diary of the Dead (1976); Cloud Dancer (1980); Harry's War (1981); and Just Between Friends (1986).

Jens appeared in the April 7, 1962, episode of The Defenders as a stripper. In 1963, she appeared in The Untouchables and The Outer Limits. Other guest roles in the 1960s included those on The Rat Patrol and I Spy. In 1967, she joined the cast of the soap opera Love Is a Many Splendored Thing, playing the role of Audrey Hurley for 500 episodes until 1973.

During the 1970s, Jens appeared in episodes of television shows such as Bonanza, Gunsmoke (S18E23 -“Talbot”), McMillan and Wife, The New Land, Gibbsville and Medical Center. In 1976–77, Jens played the role of Mae Olinski on 43 episodes of the soap spoof Mary Hartman, Mary Hartman.

In the 1980s, Jens appeared in episodes of shows including The Colbys, Cagney & Lacey, MacGyver, Falcon Crest, The Hogan Family and The Wonder Years. She played Martha Kent in several episodes of the TV series Superboy (1988–92), and in 1992–93, she appeared in a three-episode arc of the seventh season of L.A. Law. She appeared as Joan Campbell in several episodes of Melrose Place in Season 1 (1992–93) and again in an episode of Season 6 (1997).

Jens appeared in the 1993 episode of Star Trek: The Next Generation titled "The Chase" as a member of the race responsible for populating the galaxy with humanoid life forms. She appeared in a recurring role spanning five seasons of Star Trek: Deep Space Nine as the totalitarian Female Changeling (1994–99).

Jens narrated a number of documentaries including The Great War and the Shaping of the 20th Century and voiced the female Guardian in the Green Lantern (2011). In 2018, Jens lent her voice to the video game Star Trek Online, reprising her role as the Female Changeling.

== Awards ==
- Back Stage West Garland Awards, 2007 award for her role in the play Leipzig

== Filmography ==
=== Film ===
Year	Title	Role	Notes
1956	Showdown at Ulcer Gulch	Bryn Mawr	Short subject
1958	Terror from the Year 5000	Future woman/Nurse	
1961	Angel Baby	Angel Baby	
1965	Violent Journey	Mrs. Dodd	
1966	Seconds	Nora Marcus	
1969	Me, Natalie	Shirley Norton	
1972	Savages	Emily Penning	
1976	Diary of the Dead	Vera	
1980	Cloud Dancer	Jean Randolph	
1981	Harry's War	Wilda Crawley	
1986	The Clan of the Cave Bear	Narrator (voice)	
1986	Just Between Friends	Helga	
1998	I'm Losing You	Diantha Krohn	
2001	Cats & Dogs	Collie at HQ (voice)	
2001	Room 101	Edie	
2011	Green Lantern	Female Guardian	
2014	A Place for Heroes	Older Lily	
2016	Norm of the North	Councilwoman Klubeck (voice)	
2022	Finding Hannah	Hannah 2	

=== Television ===
Year	Title	Role	Notes
1958	Kraft Television Theatre	Rita	"The Eighty Seventh Precinct"
1958	The Investigator	The Sought-for Wife	"1.7"
1959	Play of the Week	Dunyasha	"The Cherry Orchard"
1961	The Million Dollar Incident	Sheila	TV film
1961	The United States Steel Hour	Gerta Blake	"Man on the Mountain Top"
1961	Great Ghost Tales	Emily Hunter	"Who Is the Fairest One of All?"
1962	The Defenders	Fay Dumont	"The Naked Heiress"
1962	Naked City	Ellen Annis	"Goodbye Mama, Hello Auntie Maud"
1962	Stoney Burke	Mavis Hazelton	"Spin a Golden Web"
1962	The Untouchables	Eva Tobek	"Arsenal"
1963	The Untouchables	Marcie Remp	"The Man in the Cooler"
1963	Alcoa Premiere	Madelyn Warren	"The Dark Labyrinth"
1963	The Outer Limits	Laurie Cameron	"Corpus Earthling"
1966	The Rat Patrol	Patricia Bauer	"The Blind Man's Bluff Raid"
1966	Barefoot in Athens	Theodote	TV film
1967	I Spy	Lindy	"A Room with a Rack"
1967-1973	Love Is a Many Splendored Thing	Audrey Hurley	Soap opera
1970	Bonanza	Madge Tucker	"The Wagon"
1970	Medical Center	Dr. Abby Whitten	"Undercurrent"
1971	The Deadly Dream	Mary	TV film
1971	Gunsmoke	Josephine Burney	"Captain Sligo"
1973	Gunsmoke	Katherine	"Talbot"
1974	ABC's Wide World of Entertainment	Ann	"The Satan Murders"
1974	McMillan & Wife	'Boom Boom' Parkins	"Reunion in Terror"
1974	Parker Adderson, Philosopher	Alice	TV short
1975	Medical Center	Heather Caddison	"The Fourth Sex: Parts 1 & 2"
1975	The Jolly Corner	Alice Staverton	TV short
1975	Petrocelli	Leah Barnes	"A Deadly Vow"
1975	The Boy Who Talked to Badgers	Esther MacDonald	Disney film
1976	The Blue Knight	Christine Barnes	"Everybody Needs a Little Attention"
1976	All's Fair	Barbara Murray	"Strange Bedfellows"
1976	Kojak	Olga Nurell	"Out of the Shadows"
1976	Gibbsville	Phyllis	"Saturday Night"
1976–77	Mary Hartman, Mary Hartman	Mae Olinski	Supporting role (seasons 1–2)
1977	In the Glitter Palace	Judge Kendis Winslow	TV film
1977	Sharon: Portrait of a Mistress	Terri	TV film
1977	Barnaby Jones	Estelle Wilson / Rosalynn Vickers	"The Reincarnation"
1979	From Here to Eternity	Gert Kipfer	TV miniseries
1979	Meeting of Minds	Empress Theodora	"Empress Theodora: Parts 1 & 2"
1980	From Here to Eternity	Gert Kipfer	"Pearl Harbor"
1980	The Golden Moment: An Olympic Love Story	Ilyena	TV film
1980	Hagen	Margaret	"The Rat Pack"
1981	A Matter of Life and Death	Murphy	TV film
1981	Hart to Hart	Sylvia Williams	"Harts and Flowers"
1981	The Two Lives of Carol Letner	Dr. Miller	TV film
1981	Quincy, M.E.	Lana Chesnell	"Dead Stop"
1982	Tomorrow's Child	Laura Pressburg	TV film
1982	Trapper John, M.D.	Helen McCall	"The One and Only"
1983	Uncommon Valor	Nurse Ann Botts	TV film
1983	Grace Kelly	Mady Christians	TV film
1983	A Killer in the Family	Alice Johansen	TV film
1985	Eye to Eye	Nita	"Dumb Death of Blonde"
1985	Playing with Fire	Dr. Becker	TV film
1986	The Colbys	Mrs. McAllister	"Fallon's Choice"
1986	Cagney & Lacey	Ann McIntyre	"Exit Stage Center"
1986	MacGyver	Sister Margaret	"The Road Not Taken"
1987	CBS Summer Playhouse	Glenda Davis	"Barrington"
1987	Falcon Crest	Claudia Chadway	"New Faces", "Sweet Revenge", "Manhunt", "Hunter's Moon"
1988–1992	Superboy	Martha Kent	Regular role
1989	Valerie	Catherine	"Paris: Parts 1-3"
1989	Cast the First Stone	Sister Angela	TV film
1990	The Wonder Years	Miss Stebbins	"Faith"
1991	Under Cover	Hausman	"Sacrifices"
1991	Before the Storm	Hausman	TV film
1992	Tales from the Crypt	Mrs. Pritchard	"Maniac at Large"
1992–93	L.A. Law	Beatrice Schuller	"Helter Shelter", "Spanky and the Art Gang", "Bare Witness"
1992–1997	Melrose Place	Joan Campbell	Guest role (seasons 1, 6)
1993	Star Trek: The Next Generation	Humanoid Progenitor	"The Chase"
1994–1999	Star Trek: Deep Space Nine	Female Changeling	Recurring role (seasons 3–4, 6–7)
1996	The Lottery	Faith Lloyd	TV film
1996	1914-1918	Narrator (U.S. version)	TV miniseries documentary
1997	Nothing Sacred	Gussie	"Roman Catholic Holiday"
1999	Star Trek: Hidden Evil	Xa-Tal (voice)	Video game
2001	Matisse & Picasso: A Gentle Rivalry	Narrator (voice)	TV short
2003	The Wild Thornberrys	Humpback Whale (voice)	"Ice Follies"
2007	Avatar: The Last Airbender	Additional voices	Episode: "The Puppetmaster"
2010	Star Trek Online	Female Changeling (voice)	Video game
2010	The Event	Old Violet	"Loyalty"
