= He Who Gets Slapped (opera) =

Opera by Robert Ward

- Opera by Robert Ward
- Librettist: Bernard Stambler
- Based on: Leonid Andreyev's He Who Gets Slapped
- Premiere: May 17, 1956; Juilliard School concert hall, New York City

He Who Gets Slapped (also known as Pantaloon and Pantaloon, He Who Gets Slapped) is a 1956 opera in three acts by composer Robert Ward with an English language libretto by Bernard Stambler which is based on Leonid Andreyev's play of the same name. The first of Ward's nine operas, the opera is written in a lyrical style reminiscent of verismo. The work is infrequently performed; with its most notable staging being at Lincoln Center by the New York City Opera in 1959. Stambler's adaptation of the play made some notable changes in plot and characterization, condensing the final two acts of the four act play into one act. The play's central character, "He", was renamed Pantaloon in reference to the character from Italian commedia dell'arte. Additionally, the play's tragic murder and suicides at the end are removed for a somewhat happier conclusion where Pantaloon is rejected by Consuelo instead of Pantaloon murdering her.

== Roles ==
Roles, voice types, premiere cast
Role	Voice type	Premiere cast, 17 May 1956 Conductor: Rudolph Thomas	New York City Opera cast, 12 April 1959 Conductor: Emerson Buckley
Pantaloon, a mysterious man who becomes a clown	baritone	Paul Ukena	David Atkinson
Consuelo, a horseback rider	soprano	Jeanne Beauvais	Lee Venora
Zinida, a lion tamer	mezzo-soprano	Regina Sarfaty	Regina Sarfaty (later Brenda Lewis (Note: Brenda Lewis was ill and replaced by Sarfaty on the opening night of the NYCO production. She resumed her role in later performances.))
Count Mancini, a wealthy patron	tenor		Norman Kelley
Begano, a jockey and Consuelo's lover	tenor		Frank Porretta
Baron Regnard, Consuelo's father	bass-baritone	Francis Barnard	Emile Renan
Briquet, the owner of the circus	baritone		Chester Ludgin
Polly, a clown	silent role		Paul Dooley
Tilly, a clown	silent role		Phil Bruns

== Composition history and the plot in relation to the play ==
Robert Ward first got the idea of adapting He Who Gets Slapped into an opera after reading the first two acts of psychoanalyst Gregory Zilboorg's English translation of the play in 1948. He approached his fellow Juilliard School faculty member, Bernard Stambler, to write the libretto. Upon reading the last two acts, both men were dissatisfied with the progression of the play, and the decision was made to substantially alter the focus of the plot for the second half of the work. The character of the "Gentleman" was entirely removed, and the story's focus shifted to Mancini's efforts to marry off Consuelo to the Baron. Rather than have a tragic murder-suicide by poison at the end, the writers chose instead to have Consuelo reject Pantaloon's profession of love and go off with her lover Begano instead.

At the suggestion of arts patron Elizabeth Kray Ussachevsky, the clown roles of Polly and Tilly were turned from dialogue roles to silent roles skilled in pantomime in order to avoid the difficulty of finding opera singers who were able to do acrobatics and other clown tricks as well as sing. Opera directors and conductors Frederic Cohen and Frederick Waldmann of the Juilliard Opera Theater helped in the development process of the opera, by having graduate students in the opera program at Juilliard sing through material as it was being written. Ward and Stan and Stambler modified their work upon feedback from Cohen, Waldmann, and the students involved. Other artists who gave valuable input included Emanuel Balaban, Mack Harrell, Otto Luening, and Max Rudolf.

== Plot ==
Setting: A circus in a large city in France

=== First act ===
A mysterious man, later known as Pantaloon, arrives at Briquet's circus. He requests to join the troop as a clown. Briquet asks to see Pantaloon's identification in order to register his employment with the government. Pantaloon discloses his name into Briquet's ear, without revealing it to the audience. The reaction of the circus owner reveals that Pantaloon is a famous upper class intellectual who is highly respected, but the audience gains no further knowledge of the character other than he is 39 years old.

=== Second act ===
Pantaloon is now an established clown in Briquet's circus and his act is highly successful, making him popular with the troop and their audiences. He has fallen in love with Consuelo from afar, who is herself in love with Begano. Consuelo's father, Baron Regnard, attempts to get Count Mancini to marry her. Pantaloon argues with Baron Regnard, claiming that the Count will never marry her. The Baron and Consuelo become engaged after she is pressured by her father. At the end of the act Zinida reveal's Pantaloon's past as a man broken by an adulterous wife who publicly humiliated him in upper class society.

=== Third act ===
Pantaloon plays the part of an intoxicated court jester. He successfully sabotages Mancini's plans to marry Consuelo. He professes his love to her. She rejects him, and goes off with Begano instead.

== Performance history ==
In the Fall of 1955 the director of Columbia University'a Columbia Theatre Associates and Opera Workshop (CTAOW), Milton Smith and the director of Columbia's opera program, Douglas Moore, agreed to stage the opera using funds provided by the Alice M. Ditson Fund. The opera premiered on May 17, 1956 under the title Pantaloon by the CTAOW in the concert hall of the Juilliard School. Staged by Felix Brentano, the cast included Paul Ukena as Pantaloon and Regina Sarfaty as Zinida. Essentially a workshopped opera presentation by a professional cast, the original production was costumed but had minimal sets and a smaller orchestra.

A fully realized presentation of the opera was not given until 1959 when it was mounted under the name He Who Gets Slapped by the New York City Opera at New York City Center in April 1959. That production was staged by Michael Pollock and used sets and costumes designed by Andreas Nomikos. For this version, Stambler revised portions of the libretto, and accordingly Ward made alterations to the score. In 1978 it was staged by the Encompass New Opera Theatre as Pantaloon, He Who Gets Slapped.
