= Joyce Ebert =

American actress (1933–1997)

- Womack
- Ebert playing Juliet at the Old Globe Theatre (1959)
- Born: June 26, 1933; Munhall
- Died: August 28, 1997 (aged 64)
- Education: Carnegie Mellon University
- Known for: Long Wharf Theatre
- Notable work: Widowing of Mrs. Holroyd, The Trojan Women, Dinner at 8
- Spouses: Michael Ebert; Arvin Brown

Joyce Ebert (June 26, 1933 – August 28, 1997) was an American actress. She was particularly known for her work as a dramatic actress at the Long Wharf Theatre in New Haven, Connecticut where she portrayed both leading and supporting roles in more than 80 productions. She also appeared on television and in films, and had a brief career as an opera singer.

Born in Homestead, Pennsylvania, Ebert graduated from the drama school at Carnegie Mellon University. In 1959 she won the San Diego Shakespeare Festival's Atlas Award. In 1961 she created the role of Betty Parris in the world premiere of Robert Ward's The Crucible at the New York City Opera. That same year she made her off-Broadway debut at the Phoenix Theatre debut as Ophelia in Hamlet. In 1964 she was the recipient of both the Clarence Derwent Award and the Obie Award for her appearance as Andromache in The Trojan Women at Circle in the Square Theatre.

In 1977 she was nominated for a Drama Desk Award for her performance as Maggie in Michael Cristofer's The Shadow Box. In 1996 she was honored with the Connecticut Critics Circle's special achievement award.

== Death ==
In 1997 she died of cancer in Southport, Connecticut, aged 64.
