= Robert Ward (composer) =

American composer (1917–2013)

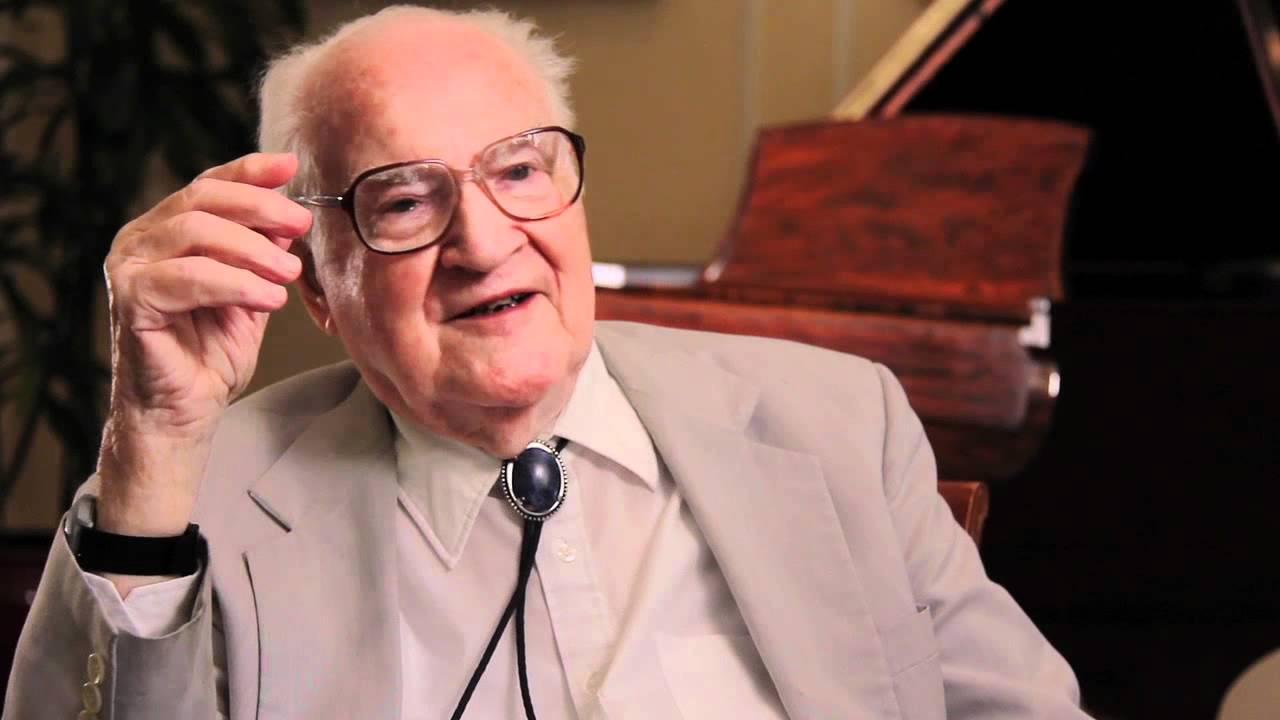

Background information
- Born: Robert Eugene Ward; September 13, 1917; Cleveland, Ohio
- Died: April 3, 2013 (aged 95) Durham, North Carolina
- Genres: Contemporary, chamber
- Occupation: Composer
- Instruments: Piano, vocals

Robert Eugene Ward (September 13, 1917 – April 3, 2013) was an American composer who is best remembered for his opera The Crucible (1961) after the 1953 play of the same name by Arthur Miller. He was awarded the Pulitzer Prize for Music for that opera in 1962.

== Early work and education ==
Ward was born in Cleveland, Ohio, one of five children of the owner of a moving and storage company. He sang in church choirs and local opera theaters when he was a boy. His earliest extant compositions date to 1934, at a time he was attending John Adams High School, from which he graduated in 1935. After that, Ward attended the Eastman School of Music in Rochester, New York, where his composition teachers were Bernard Rogers, Howard Hanson and Edward Royce. Ward received a fellowship and attended the Juilliard School of Music in New York from 1939 to 1942, where he studied composition with Frederick Jacobi, orchestration with Bernard Wagenaar, and conducting with Albert Stoessel and Edgar Schenkman. In the summer of 1941 he studied under Aaron Copland at the Berkshire Music Center in Massachusetts.

From his student days to the end of World War II, Ward produced about forty compositions, of which eleven he later withdrew. Most of those early works are small scale, songs and pieces for piano or chamber ensembles. He completed his First Symphony in 1941, which won the Juilliard Publication Award the following year. Around that time, Ward also wrote a number of reviews and other articles for the magazine Modern Music and served on the faculty of Queens College.

In February 1942 Ward joined the U.S. Army, and attended the Army Music School at Fort Myer, being assigned the military occupational specialty of band director. At Fort Riley, Kansas, he wrote a major part of the score to a musical revue called The Life of Riley. Ward was assigned to the 7th Infantry and sent to the Pacific. For the 7th Infantry Band he wrote a March, and for its dance band he wrote at least two jazz compositions.

During his military service Ward met Mary Raymond Benedict, a Red Cross recreation worker. They married on June 19, 1944, and had five children; Melinda, Jonathon, Mark, Johanna and Tim.

== Major works ==
Ward earned a Bronze Star for meritorious service in the Aleutian Islands. During his military service Ward managed to compose two serious orchestral compositions, Adagio and Allegro, first performed in New York in 1944, and Jubilation: An Overture, which was written mostly on Okinawa, Japan, in 1945, and was premiered at Carnegie Hall by the National Orchestral Association the following spring.

After being discharged from military service at the end of the war, Ward returned to Juilliard, earning postgraduate certificate in 1946 and immediately joining the faculty, teaching there until 1956. He served as an Associate in Music at Columbia University from 1946 to 1948.

Ward wrote his Second Symphony, dedicated to his wife, in 1947, while living in Nyack, New York. It was premiered by the National Symphony Orchestra conducted by Hans Kindler. This symphony was quite popular for a few years, in part thanks to Eugene Ormandy playing it with the Philadelphia Orchestra several times and even taking it on tour to Carnegie Hall in New York and Constitution Hall in Washington, D.C.

Andrew Stiller, in his article on Ward for The New Grove Dictionary of Music and Musicians, describes Ward's musical style as deriving "largely from Hindemith, but also shows the considerable influence of Gershwin".

Ward conducted the Doctors Orchestral Society of New York from 1949 to 1955, wrote his Third Symphony and his First Sonata for Violin and Piano in 1950, the Sacred Songs for Pantheists in 1951, and was music director of the Third Street Music School Settlement from 1952 to 1955, and wrote the Euphony for Orchestra in 1954. He left Juilliard in 1956 to become Executive Vice-President of Galaxy Music Corporation and Managing Editor of High Gate Press in New York, positions he maintained until 1967. Ward wrote his Fourth Symphony in 1958, the Prairie Overture in 1957, the cantata Earth Shall Be Fair and the Divertimento in 1960.

Ward wrote his first opera to a libretto by Bernard Stambler, He Who Gets Slapped, and it was premiered in 1956. His next opera, The Crucible, based on Arthur Miller's play, premiered in 1961, became Ward's best known work. For it Ward received the 1962 Pulitzer Prize for Music. It is frequently produced around the world.

After the success of The Crucible, Ward received several commissions for ceremonial works, such as Hymn and Celebration in 1962, Music for a Celebration in 1963, Festive Ode in 1966, Fiesta Processional in 1966, and Music for a Great Occasion in 1970. During those years he also wrote the cantata, Sweet Freedom's Song, in 1965; the Fifth Symphony in 1976; a Piano Concerto in 1968, which was commissioned by the Powder River Foundation for the soloist Marjorie Mitchell; a Saxophone Concerto in 1984; and the operas The Lady from Colorado in 1964, Claudia Leqare in 1977, Abelard and Heloise in 1981, Minutes till Midnight in 1982, and Roman Fever in 1993 (based on the short story of the same name by Edith Wharton). He also wrote chamber music, such as the First String Quartet of 1966 and the Raleigh Divertimento of 1985.

His work has been championed by such conductors as Igor Buketoff, who recorded the 3rd and 6th symphonies.

== Later work ==
In 1967, Ward became Chancellor of the North Carolina School of the Arts in Winston-Salem. He held this post until 1975, when he stepped down to serve as a member of the composition faculty for five more years. In 1978 he came to Duke University as a visiting professor, and there he remained as Mary Duke Biddle Professor of Music from 1979 to 1987. His students included Michael Penny and Michael Ching.

In the fall of 1987, he retired from Duke University as Professor Emeritus, and continued to live and compose in Durham, North Carolina. His most recent composition is "In Praise of Science," which premiered at the ribbon-cutting ceremony of Syracuse University's Life Science Complex by the Syracuse University Brass Ensemble on November 7, 2008.

After a period of failing health, Ward died in a Durham retirement home on April 3, 2013, at the age of 95.

== Selected works ==
Ward's music is largely published by Highgate Press, E.C. Schirmer, Associated Music Publishers, Peer International, Merrymount Music Press, C.F. Peters and Vireo Press.

=== Opera ===
- He Who Gets Slapped, original title: Pantaloon, opera in 3 acts (1956); libretto by Bernard Stambler after the play by Leonid Andreyev
- The Crucible, opera in 4 acts (1961); libretto by Bernard Stambler after the play by Arthur Miller; recipient of the 1962 Pulitzer Prize for Music
- The Lady from Colorado (1964); revised in 1993 as Lady Kate; libretto by Bernard Stambler after the novel by Homer Croy
- Claudia Legare, opera in 4 acts (1977); libretto by Bernard Stambler after the play Hedda Gabler by Henrik Ibsen
- Abelard and Heloise, Music Drama in 3 acts (1981); libretto by Jan Hartman
- Minutes Till Midnight, opera in 3 acts (1982); libretto by Daniel Lang
- Lady Kate, opera in 2 acts (1964, 1993); 2nd version of The Lady from Colorado; libretto by Bernard Stambler after the novel by Homer Croy
- Roman Fever, opera in 1 act (1993); libretto by Roger Brunyate after the story by Edith Wharton
- A Friend of Napoleon, operetta in 2 acts (2005); libretto by James [Doc] Stuart, based on the short story by Richard Connell

=== Orchestral ===
- Slow Music (1937) [withdrawn--reworked into Adagio and Allegro]
- Ode (1938) [withdrawn]
- A Yankee Overture (1940) [withdrawn]
- Andante and Scherzo for string orchestra (1940) [withdrawn]
- Symphony No. 1 (1941–1942) Winner of the Juilliard Publication Award, 1942
- Adagio and Allegro (1944)
- Jubilation, an Overture (1945); also for concert band
- Aria (1946) [withdrawn--reworked into Symphony No. 2]
- Symphony No. 2 (1947)
- Concert Music (1948)
- Serenade for Strings (1948) [withdrawn--reworked into Euphony, Night Music and Symphony No. 4]
- Night Music (1949) [withdrawn]
- Symphony No. 3 (1950)
- Euphony for Orchestra (1954)
- Prairie Overture (1957); original version for concert band
- Symphony No. 4 (1958, rev. 1977)
- Divertimento for Orchestra (1960)
- Hymn and Celebration (1962, rev. 1966)
- Music for a Celebration (Trilogy for Orchestra) (1963) [Withdrawn as a 3-movement work. Movements published separately as listed below.]
- Processional March (1963) [originally movement 3 of Music for a Celebration. Later, also reworked into Symphony No. 5.]
- Invocation and Toccata (1966) [originally movements 1 & 2 of Music for a Celebration]
- Festive Ode (1966)
- Hymn to the Night (1966) (Tone poem based on Longfellow)
- Concertino for string orchestra (1973)
- Symphony No. 5 (Canticles of America) (1976)
- The Promised Land (On Jordan's Stormy Banks), chorale prelude for orchestra (or organ), with optional congregational participation (1977)
- Sonic Structure (1980)
- Festival Triptych with opt. narrator (1986)
- By the Way of Memories, Nocturne for orchestra (1987)
- Symphony No. 6 (1988)
- 5x5, Four Variations on a Five-Part Theme (1989)
- A Western Set (1992) (Suite from Lady Kate)
- The Scarlet Letter Ballet Suite (1994)
- Symphony No. 7 (The Savannah) (2003)
- Beginnings, An Overture (2006)
- City of Oaks for orchestra (2007)

=== Concert band ===
- The Rolling Seventh march for band (1943); written during military service [withdrawn]
- Life of Riley, musical revue for swing band, men's chorus and soloists (1942); written during military service [withdrawn]
- Just As You Were for voice and swing band (1943); written during military service [withdrawn--tune reworked into mvt. 2 of the Concerto for Saxophone]
- Jubilation, an overture (1946); original version for orchestra; transcribed for band by Robert Leist
- Prairie Overture (1957); also for orchestra
- Night Fantasy (1962)
- Fiesta Processional (1966)
- Music for a Great Occasion (1970) [withdrawn]
- Antiphony (1973)
- Four Abstractions (1977)

1. Jagged Rhythms in Fast Tempo
2. Color Masses and Luminous Lines in Dark Blue
3. Curves and Points of Light in Motion
4. Interweaving Lines

=== Concertante ===
- Concerto for piano and orchestra (1968)
- Concerto for tenor saxophone and orchestra (1984)
- Concerto for violin and orchestra (1993, revised 1994)
- Dialogues, a Triple Concerto for violin, cello, piano and orchestra (1986–2002)

=== Chamber music ===
- String Quartet (1937) [withdrawn--movement 2 reworked into Andante and Scherzo]
- Movement for String Quartet (1941) [withdrawn--reworked into Adagio and Allegro (1943)]
- Energetically (1941) [withdrawn--reworked into Jubilation Overture (1945)]
- Sonata No. 1 for violin and piano (1950)
- Arioso and Tarantelle for cello (or viola) and piano (1954)
- Fantasia for Brass Choir and Timpani (1956) for orchestral brass (3 trumpets, 4 horns, 3 trombones, tuba) and timpani
- String Quartet No. 1 (1966) [Movements 2 & 3 also reworked into the Concertino for Strings (1973)]
- Dialogues for Violin, Cello and Piano (or orchestra) (1987) (earlier, shorter chamber version of Triple Concerto)
- Raleigh Divertimento, woodwind quintet version (1986); Nonet version (2004)
- Fanfare for Durham, for orchestral brass brass, timpani and percussion (1988)
- Sonata No. 2 for violin and piano (1990)
- Appalachian Ditties and Dances for violin and piano (1991)
- Bath County Rhapsody, piano quintet (1991)
- Serenade for Mallarmé for flute, viola, cello and piano (1991)
- Echoes of America, trio for clarinet, cello and piano (1997)
- Night under the Big Sky, nocturne based on themes from Lady Kate for flute, oboe, clarinet, horn, bassoon, and piano (1998)
- Brass Ablaze for brass band (cornets, flugelhorns, horns, euphoniums and tubas) and percussion
- Quintet for oboe and string quartet (2005)

=== Keyboard ===
- Song for piano (1941) [originally one of two movements for piano, later reworked into Sonatine; Adagio and Allegro; Hymn and Celebration and String Quartet No. 1]
- Lamentation (1946) [published with Scherzo]
- Sonatine (1948) [withdrawn--mvt. 3 reworked into Divertimento]
- Scherzo (1950 [published with Lamentation]
- The Promised Land (On Jordan's Stormy Banks), chorale prelude for organ (or orchestra), with optional congregational participation (1977)
- Celebration of God in Nature, suite for organ (1979)

=== Vocal ===
- Three Songs for high voice and piano (1934); text by Thomas S. Jones, Jr.: "I Know a quiet vale", "Daphne", "My soul is like a garden close" [withdrawn]
- Fatal Interview song cycle for soprano and orchestra (1937); text by Edna St. Vincent Millay

1. What thing is this
2. Not in a casket cool with pearls

- Epithalamion for high voice and piano (1937); text by Percy Blysse Shelley [withdrawn]
- New Hampshire for 6 women's voices and string quartet (1938); text by T.S. Eliot [withdrawn]
- First Harvest [title given to the group of five songs listed below, each originally written and published separately]

1. Sorrow of Mydath for high voice and piano (1939); words by John Masefield
2. As I Watched the Ploughman Ploughing for high voice and piano (1940); words by Walt Whitman
3. Rain has fallen all the day for high voice and piano (1940); text by James Joyce [tune reworked into By the Way of Memories Nocturne]
4. Anna Miranda for high voice and piano (1940); text by Stephen Vincent Benét
5. Vanished for high voice and piano (1941); text by Emily Dickinson

- Jonathon and the Gingery Snare for narrator and orchestra (1949); words by Bernard Stambler [also reworked into Festival Triptych]
- Sacred Songs for Pantheists for soprano and orchestra (or piano) (1951); words by Gerard Manley Hopkins, James Stephens and Emily Dickinson

1. Pied Beauty (Hopkins)
2. Little Things (Stephens)
3. Intoxication (Dickinson)
4. Heaven-Haven (Hopkins)
5. God's Grandeur (Hopkins)

- Three Pieces for Narrator and Piano (based on T.S. Eliot poems from Old Possum's Book of Practical Cats) 1957 [withdrawn]
- Love's Seasons, song cycle for high voice and piano (1994); words from Fatal Interview by Edna St Vincent Millay
- In Praise of Science for soprano, brass, and percussion (2008); words by Anne Lynch Botta

=== Choral ===
- Hush'd Be the Camps Today (May 4, 1865) for mixed chorus and orchestra (or piano) (1940); words by Walt Whitman
- With rue my heart is laden for mixed chorus a cappella (1949); words by A. E. Housman
- Concord Hymn for mixed chorus a cappella (1949); words by Ralph Waldo Emerson
- When Christ Rode Into Jerusalem for mixed chorus, soprano solo and organ (1956); text paraphrased from New Testament
- That Wondrous Night of Christmas Eve for mixed chorus a cappella (1957)
- Earth Shall Be Fair, cantata for mixed chorus (or double chorus), children's chorus (or soprano solo) and orchestra (or organ) (1960); Biblical text

1. Lord, thou hast been our dwelling place
2. Then the kings of the earth
3. Thou changest man back to the dust
4. Earth might be fair
5. Search me, O God, and know my heart

- Let the Word Go Forth for mixed chorus, brass, harp and string orchestra (1965); words from the inaugural address of John F. Kennedy
- Sweet Freedom's Song: A New England Chronicle, cantata for soprano, baritone, narrator, mixed chorus and orchestra (1965)

1. Prelude
2. It Was a Great Design
3. O, Lord God of My Salvation
4. Come, Ye Thankful People, Come
5. Ballad of Boston Bay
6. Damnation to the Stamp Act
7. Epitaphs
8. Let Music Swell the Breeze

- Symphony No. 5 Canticles of America for soprano, baritone, narrator, mixed chorus and orchestra (1976); words by Walt Whitman and Henry Wadsworth Longfellow

1. Behold, America
2. A Psalm of Life
3. Hymn to the Night
4. All Peoples of the Globe Together Sail

- Images of God, a Sacred Service including a Mystery Play for minister, soprano, baritone, mixed chorus, organ and players (1988–1989)

1. In His Last Days, Jesus Came to Jerusalem for soprano solo, SATB chorus and organ
2. Let Us Heed the Voice Within for SATB and organ

- I Hail This Land (from Lady Kate) for SATB and band (or piano) (1993)
- Consider Well God's Ways for baritone solo and SATB chorus
- Sacred Canticles for SATB chorus, trumpet, percussion and keyboard
- Would You Be Glad for SATB chorus, children's chorus and organ
- Cherish Your Land, for baritone solo, SATB chorus and chamber ensemble (or piano) (2001)
- The Lamb for SA chorus and optional string orchestra (2009)
