= Johanna Wallroth =

Swedish soprano (born 1993)

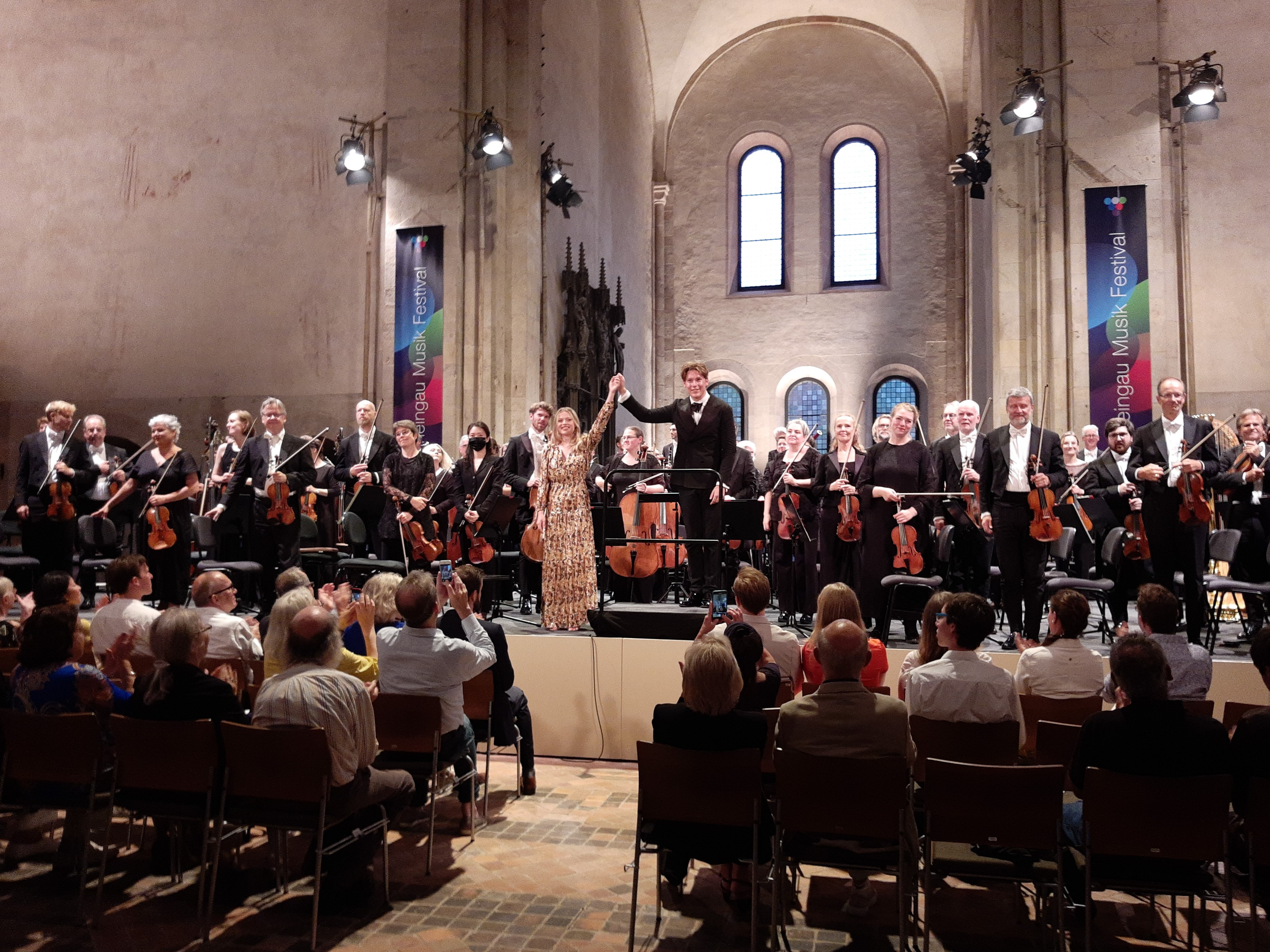
- Wallroth as soloist in Mahler's Fourth Symphony, conducted by Klaus Mäkelä
- Born: 1993 (age 31–32)
- Education: University of Music and Performing Arts Vienna
- Occupation: Operatic soprano

Johanna Wallroth (born 1993) is a Swedish operatic soprano who made an international career in opera and concert.

== Life and career ==
Born in Sweden in 1993, Wallroth took ballet classes and sang in the children's chorus of the Royal Swedish Opera. She first trained to become a dancer at the Royal Swedish Ballet school, and then studied voice, from 2016 at the University of Music and Performing Arts Vienna, where she graduated.

She made her operatic debut as Barbarina in Mozart's Le nozze di figaro in 2013 at the Ulriksdal Palace Theatre in Stockholm, conducted by Arnold Östman. She appeared in Vienna as Eurydice in Gluck's Orfeo ed Euridice in a performance of the university, and as Despina in Mozart's Così fan tutte at the Schlosstheater Schönbrunn, where she returned as Gretel in Humperdinck's Hänsel und Gretel and as Susanna in Le nozze di figaro. She performed Mozart's Pamina in Die Zauberflöte at the Gnessin State Musical College, Ismene in Telemann's Orpheus at Vadstena Castle, and both Sandmännchen and Taumännchen in Hänsel und Gretel for NorrlandsOperan in Umeå. In 2019 she won the Mirjam Helin Competition. She then became a member of the Vienna State Opera's studio in 2020, earning the Birgit Nilsson scholarship of 2021.

In 2022, Wallroth returned to Stockholm where she soloed as Leocasta in Vivaldi's Il Giustino

In 2023, she was named as one of eight New Generation Artists of the BBC for the period 2023 to 2025.

=== Opera ===
In 2023 Wallroth was Barbarina again in a new production of the Vienna State Opera directed by Barrie Kosky. In July 2024 she sang Cleopatra at Glyndebourne in two performances of Giulio Cesare.

=== Concert ===
Wallroth is classical artist in residence with the Swedish Radio Symphony Orchestra for the 2022/23 and 2023/24 seasons, performing works such as Alban Berg's Seven Early Songs, conducted by Daniel Harding, and Schubert's Mass No. 6, conducted by András Schiff.

She performed the soprano solo of Beethoven's Ninth Symphony in a New Year's concert with the Rundfunk-Sinfonieorchester Berlin conducted by Vladimir Jurowski. She appeared at the Vienna Musikverein in the spring of 2023, singing in Pergolesi's Stabat Mater and Mozart's Coronation Mass with the Orchester Wiener Akademie conducted by Martin Haselböck.

Wallroth appeared at the 2023 Rheingau Musik Festival in a concert at Eberbach Abbey of Mahler's Fourth Symphony, with the Oslo Philharmonic conducted by Klaus Mäkelä. A reviewer from the FAZ wrote about an approach of both depth and lightness, while a reviewer from the Frankfurter Rundschau noted her grandiose interpretation of the music's absurdity and lust ("Irrwitz und Lust").
