= Requiem (disambiguation) =

The Requiem is a Roman Catholic liturgical service.

Requiem may also refer to:

== Ballet ==
- Requiem (Baynes) (2001)
- Requiem (Eifman) (1998)
- Requiem (MacMillan) (1976)
- Requiem (Rushton), a 2006 ballet by Tim Rushton

== Film ==
- Requiem (1982 film), a Hungarian film
- Requiem (1995 film), an American short film
- Requiem (2006 film), a German film about exorcism
- Aliens vs. Predator: Requiem, a 2007 science fiction film
- Requiem (2021 film), a British horror short film

== Literature ==
- Requiem (Anna Akhmatova), a lyrical cycle of elegy by Anna Akhmatova
- Requiem (Fisher novel), 1933, by A. E. Fisher
- Requiem (Gō novel), 1972, by Shizuko Gō
- Requiem (short story collection), a 1992 Robert A. Heinlein retrospective
- Requiem: A Hallucination, a 1991 novel by Antonio Tabucchi
- Requiem (Young novel), a 2008 historical fiction novel by Robyn Young
- "The Requiem" (short story), an 1886 story by Anton Chekhov
- "Requiem" (short story), a short story by Robert A. Heinlein
- Requiem Chevalier Vampire, a French comics series by Pat Mills
- Silver Surfer: Requiem, a Marvel Knights limited series by J. Michael Straczynski
- Requiem (DC Comics), a comic book series based on the character Artemis of Bana-Mighdall
- Requiem, a book about photographers killed in the Vietnam War, co-edited by Horst Faas and Tim Page
- "Requiem", a comic book tie-in to Final Crisis
- "Requiem", a poem by Robert Louis Stevenson

== Music ==
=== Compositions ===
- Requiem (Berlioz)
- A German Requiem (Brahms)
- Requiem (Bruckner)
- Requiem (Cherubini)
- Requiem (Delius)
- Requiem (Duruflé)
- Requiem (Dvořák)
- Requiem (Fauré)
- Requiem (Harbison)
- Requiem (Michael Haydn)
- Requiem (Henze)
- Requiem (Howells)
- Requiem (Jenkins)
- Requiem (Ligeti)
- Requiem (Lloyd Webber)
- Requiem (Martin)
- Requiem (Mozart)
- Requiem (Ockeghem)
- Requiem for my friend (Preisner)
- Requiem (Reger)
- Requiem (Rouse)
- Requiem (Rutter)
- Requiem (Saint-Saëns)
- Requiem (Schumann)
- Requiem (Tishchenko)
- Requiem (Verdi)
- Requiem (Weinberg)
- War Requiem

=== Albums ===
- Requiem (The Autumn Offering album) (2009)
- Requiem (Bathory album) (1994)
- Requiem (Bracket album) (2005)
- Requiem (The Confession album) (2007)
- Requiem (The Getaway Plan album) (2011)
- Requiem (Goat album) (2016)
- Requiem (John 5 album) (2008)
- Requiem (Karl Jenkins album) (2005)
- Requiem (Killing Joke album) (2009)
- Requiem (Korn album) (2022)
- Requiem (Jón Leifs)
- Requiem (Branford Marsalis album) (1999)
- Requiem (William Parker album) (2006)
- Requiem (Verdena album) (2007)
- Requiem, a 2005 album by Skarp
- Requiem, a trilogy of albums by Virgin Black

=== Songs ===
- "Requiem" (Alma song) (2017)
- "Requiem" (Killing Joke song) (1980)
- "Requiem" (London Boys song) (1988)
- "Requiem", a song by Avenged Sevenfold from Hail to the King
- "Requiem", a song by Cave In from Jupiter
- "Requiem", a song by Devin Townsend from Empath
- "Requiem", a song by Gary Barlow from Since I Saw You Last
- "Requiem", a song by Jethro Tull from Minstrel in the Gallery
- "Requiem", a song by Killswitch Engage from This Consequence
- "Requiem", a song by Lamb of God from Sacrament
- "Requiem", a song by Make Them Suffer from Old Souls
- "Requiem", a song by Opeth from Orchid
- "Requiem", a song by Paradise Lost from In Requiem
- "Requiem (We Will Remember)", a 1991 song by Saxon from Solid Ball of Rock
- "Requiem", a song by S.E.S. from Choose My Life-U
- "Requiem", a song by Structures from Life Through a Window
- "Requiem", a song by Tristania from Darkest White
- "Requiem", a song by Trivium from Ember to Inferno
- "Requiem", a song featuring Cory Taylor from Strait Up
- "Requiem", a song from the 2015 stage musical Dear Evan Hansen
- "Requiem", a song by Đorđe Balašević from Panta Rei
- "The Requiem", a song by Linkin Park from A Thousand Suns

== Television ==
- Requiem (TV series), a 2018 BBC drama serial
- "Requiem" (The Blacklist), an episode of The Blacklist
- "Requiem" (Daredevil: Born Again), an episode of Daredevil: Born Again
- "Requiem", an episode of Dungeons & Dragons
- "Requiem" (NCIS), an episode of NCIS
- "Requiem" (Sanctuary), an episode of Sanctuary
- "Requiem" (Sliders), an episode of Sliders
- "Requiem" (Smallville), an episode of Smallville
- "Requiem", an episode of Teenage Mutant Ninja Turtles
- "Requiem" (The West Wing), an episode of The West Wing
- "Requiem" (The X-Files), an episode of The X-Files

== Video games ==
- Requiem: Avenging Angel, a 1999 PC game
- Requiem: Memento Mori, a 2007 PC game
- Penumbra: Requiem, a 2008 expansion to the game Penumbra: Black Plague
- A Plague Tale: Requiem, a 2022 sequel to the game A Plague Tale: Innocence
- Resident Evil Requiem, a 2026 sequel to the game Resident Evil Village

== Other uses ==
- Requiem (typeface), an old-style serif font
- Requiem shark, a classification of sharks
- Requiem Studio, an audio effects production company
- Requiem Stand, a manifestation of supernatural powers in JoJo's Bizarre Adventure
- Vampire: The Requiem, a 2004 tabletop role-playing game

== See also ==
- Music written for the Requiem Mass
- Requiem (comics), a list of comics topics
- Requiem Canticles (disambiguation)
- Requiem for a Dream, a 2000 American drama film
