= Boris Tishchenko =

Russian composer

Boris Ivanovich Tishchenko (Russian Бори́с Ива́нович Ти́щенко; 23 March 1939 – 9 December 2010) was a Russian and Soviet composer and pianist.

== Life ==
Tishchenko was born in Leningrad. He studied at the Leningrad Musical College from 1954 to 1957. There he learnt composition under Galina Ustvolskaya and piano under Mikhelis. Then from 1957 to 1963 he studied composition with Vadim Salmanov, Victor Voloshinov and Orest Evlakhov, and piano with L. Logovinski at the Leningrad Conservatory. He took a postgraduate course with the composer Dmitri Shostakovich from 1962 to 1965. He subsequently joined the faculty of the Leningrad Conservatory from 1965, and became a professor there in 1986.

Tishchenko was married three times. His first marriage, to the pianist Anastasia Braudo, produced a son, Dmitri. His second wife was the singer Galina Kulichenko, and the couple had a son, Vsevolod. Both of these marriages ended in divorce. His third wife was the harpist Irina Donskaya, and their marriage produced a son, Andrei. His third wife and all of his sons survived him.

== Music ==
His output includes eight numbered symphonies, nine unnumbered symphonies, two violin concertos, two cello concertos, a piano concerto, a harp concerto, a concerto for flute and piano, a concerto for violin and piano, six string quartets, two cello sonatas, eleven piano sonatas, a requiem, chamber and vocal works, the opera The Stolen Sun, the operetta A Cockroach, three ballets The Twelve, Fly-bee and Yaroslavna (The Eclipse), and incidental music for theatre and film.

Tishchenko's music style and composing manner shows him to be a typical representative of the Leningrad composers' school. He was very much influenced by music of his teachers Dmitri Shostakovich and Galina Ustvolskaya, turning these influences in his own way. He tried to use some experimental and modernist ideas like twelve-tone or aleatoric techniques, but was much more attached to the native traditions of his homeland. He demonstrated a kind of originality, scoring his Second Cello Concerto for 48 cellos, 12 double-basses and percussion (1969). Ten years later, however, he re-orchestrated it for a more practical combination.

He was honored by Shostakovich's orchestration of his First Cello Concerto, and repaid his master by the orchestration, editing and transcription of a few scores by Shostakovich. Tishchenko's Requiem, to the forbidden poem by Anna Akhmatova, written in the period of political stagnation in 1966, was a courageous cultural gesture.

== Works ==
=== Stage ===
- Newly-Ploughed Virgin Soil, incidental music, Op. 16 (1959)
- The Twelve, ballet in four acts, Op. 25 (1963)
- The Death of Pushkin, dramatic music, Op. 38 (1967)
- Fly-Bee, ballet in one act, Op 39 (1968)
- The Stolen Sun, opera in one act, Op. 40 (1968) (libretto by Mikhail Bialik, Z. Korogodsky and B. Tishchenko, after the tale by Korney Chukovsky)
- A Cockroach, musical comedy in one act, Op. 41 (1968) (libretto by Z. Korogodsky, after the tale by Korney Chukovsky)
- The Choice, music to A. Arbuzov's Play, Op. 51 (1972)
- That One Who Gets a Slap, music to L. Andreyev's play, Op. 55 (1973)
- Circus Suite, from the above, Op. 55a (1973)
- Yaroslavna (The Eclipse), ballet in three acts, Op. 58 (1974)
- Advice and Love, music to V. Tendriakov's play, Op. 60 (1974)
- A Lark, incidental music for J. Anouilh's play, Op. 62 (1974)
- Rosa Bernd, music to G. Hauptman's play, Op. 65 (1975)
- The Children of the Sun, music to M. Gorky's play, Op. 66 (1976)
- An Ignoramus, music to D. Fonvizin's play, Op. 68 (1976)
- The Seven Call Signs, Op. 70 (1977) (music for the Olympic Games in 1980, but not used)
- Ivanov, music to A. Chekhov's play, Op. 72 (1978)
- An Emigrant from Brisbane, music to G. Shekhade's play, Op. 73 (1978)
- Richard the Third, music to W. Shakespeare's play, Op. 74 (1978)
- A Shore, music to Yu. Bondarev's play, Op. 75 (1979)
- Excuse Me, music to V. Astafiev's play, Op. 78 (1980)
- Continuation of Don Juan, music to A. Radzinsky's play, Op. 82 (1980)
- Rumours, music to A. Salinsky's play, Op. 88 (1983)
- Such a Long Winter, music to Yu. Voronov's play, Op. 89 (1984)
- Light but not Heat, music to A. Ostrovsky's play, Op. 95 (1986)
- The Three Sisters, music to Chekhov's play, Op. 102 (1987)
- The Dog's Heart, music to Chervinsky's play, Op. 103 (1988)
- The Event, music to Nabokov's play, Op. 110 (1991)
- George Dandin, Music to Molière's play, Op 117 (1993)
- Boris Godunov, music for Pushkin's tragedy, Op. 126 (1999)
- Duel, music for drama production after A. Chekhov, Op. 134 (2003)

=== Film music ===
- On One Planet, Op. 33 (1965)
- Birth of a Ship, Op. 43 (1969)
- The Pier of That Shore, Op. 49 (1971)
- The Word about Prince Igor Troop, Op. 50 (1971) (not released)
- The Day of Reception on Personal Issues, Op. 59 (1974)
- The Children As Children, Op. 71 (1978)
- Light in a Window, Op. 79 (1980)
- Sergei Ivanovich is Retiring, Op. 80 (1980)
- Yet before the War, Op. 86 (1982) (not used)
- Fires, Op. 91 (1984)
- Igor Savovich, Op. 100 (1986)
- Lost Time, Op. 107 (1988)

=== Orchestral ===
- Symphonies
  - Symphony No. 1, Op. 20 (1961)
  - Symphony No. 2 (Marina), Op. 28 (1964)
  - Symphony No. 3, for ensemble, Op. 36 (1966)
  - Symphony No. 4, with narrator, Op. 61 (1974)
  - Symphony No. 5, Op. 67 (1976)
  - Symphony No. 6, for soprano, contralto and symphony orchestra, Op 105 (1988)
  - Symphony No. 7, Op. 119 (1994)
  - Symphony No. 8, Op. 149 (2008)
  - Symphony No. 9 (2009, unfinished)
- Praeludium e Fugue, for string orchestra, Op. 7 (1957)
- A French Symphony, Op. 12/116 (1958, rev. 1993)
- Danaide, symphonic poem, Op. 24 (1963)
- Octaves, Op. 26 (1963)
- Palekh, Op. 34 (1965)
- Sinfonia Robusta, Op. 46 (1970)
- Praeludium in E, symphonic piece, Op. 87 (1983) (Dedicated to the jubilee of Y. Mravinsky's orchestra)
- The Blockade Chronicle, a symphony for full orchestra, Op.92 (1984)
- Concerto Alla Marcia, for sixteen soloists, Op. 106 (1989)
- Beatrice (Choreo-symphonic cycle, 1998–2005)
  - Dante Symphony No. 1 ("Among the living"), Op. 123 No. 1 (1998)
  - Dante Symphony No. 2 ("Abandon Hope, All Ye Who Enter Here"), Op. 123 No. 2 (2000)
  - Dante Symphony No. 3 ("Inferno"), Op. 123 No. 3 (2001)
  - Dante Symphony No. 4 ("Purgatory"), Op. 123 No. 4 (2003)
  - Dante Symphony No. 5 ("Paradise"), Op. 123 No. 5 (2005)
- A Pushkin Symphony, Op. 125 (1998)
- Huge Sonata for string orchestra, Op. 132 (2002)
- Variations on three themes by D. Shostakovich for symphony orchestra, Op. 143 (2005)

=== Concertante ===
- Piano Concerto, Op. 21 (1962)
- Violin Concerto No. 1, Op. 9/29 (1958, rev. 1964)
- Violin Concerto No. 2, Op. 84 (1981)
- Cello Concerto No. 1, for solo cello, 17 wind instruments, percussion, and harmonium, Op. 23 (1963) (Also orchestrated by Dmitri Shostakovich in 1969)
- Cello Concerto No. 2, for solo cello, 48 cellos, 12 double-basses, and percussion, Op. 44 (1969, rearranged for orchestra in 1979)
- Concerto for Flute, Piano and String Orchestra, Op. 54 (1972)
- Harp Concerto, Op. 69 (1977)
- Concerto for Violin, Piano and String Orchestra, Op. 144 (2006)

=== Piano ===
- Variations for piano, Op. 1 (1956)
- Piano Sonatas
  - Piano Sonata No. 1, Op. 3/121 (1957, rev. 1995)
  - Piano Sonata No. 2, Op. 17 (1960)
  - Piano Sonata No. 3, Op. 32 (1965)
  - Piano Sonata No. 4, Op. 53 (1972)
  - Piano Sonata No. 5, Op. 56 (1973)
  - Piano Sonata No. 6, Op. 64 (1976)
  - Piano Sonata No. 7, with bells, Op. 85 (1982)
  - Piano Sonata No. 8, Op. 99 (1986)
  - Piano Sonata No. 9, Op. 114 (1992)
  - Piano Sonata No. 10 (Eureka!), Op. 124 (1997)
  - Piano Sonata No. 11, Op. 151 (2008)
- Suite for Piano No. 1, Op. 4 (1957)
- Suite for Piano No. 2, Op. 6 (1957)
- A Muleteer, fable for piano, Op. 11 (1958)
- Three Riddles for Piano, Op. 19 (1960)
- Eight Portraits for Piano 4-hands, Op. 122b (1996)
- Invasion, concert étude for piano on the theme of P. Dvoirin, Op. 131 (2002)
- Muddle, concert étude for piano on the theme of P. Dvoirin, Op. 133 (2003)

=== Instrumental ===
- Sonata for Solo Violin No. 1, Op. 5 (1957)
- Sonata for Solo Violin No. 2, Op. 63 (1975)
- Sonata for Solo Cello No. 1, Op. 18 (1960)
- Sonata for Solo Cello No. 2, Op. 76 (1979)
- Sonata for Solo Cello No. 3, Op. 136 (2003)
- Rondo for Violin and Piano, Op 2 (1956)
- Twelve Inventions for Organ, Op. 27 (1964)
- Capriccio for Violin and Piano, Op. 31 (1965)
- Two Pieces for Percussion, Op. 45 (1970)
- Four Pieces for Tuba solo, Op. 94 (1985)
- Twelve Portraits for Organ, Op. 113 (1992)
- Fantasy for Violin and Piano, Op. 118 (1994)
- Sonata for Recorder (five instruments) and Organ, Op. 127 (1999)

=== Chamber ===
- Praeludium e Fugue, for string quartet (1957)
- String Quartets
  - String Quartet No. 1, Op. 8 (1957)
  - String Quartet No. 2, Op. 13 (1959)
  - String Quartet No. 3, Op. 47 (1970)
  - String Quartet No. 4, Op. 77 (1980)
  - String Quartet No. 5, Op. 90 (1984)
  - String Quartet No. 6, Op. 148 (2007)
- Northern Exercises, suite for ensemble, Op. 42 (1968)
- Piano Quintet, Op. 93 (1985)
- The Dog's Heart, novels for chamber ensemble (after Mikhail Bulgakov, Op. 104 (1988))
- Concerto for Clarinet and Piano Trio, Op. 109 (1990)

=== Vocal-orchestral ===
- Lenin is Alive, cantata after Vladimir Mayakovsky for mixed chorus with orchestra, Op. 15 (1959)
- Suzdal, suite for soprano, tenor and chamber-orchestra, Op. 30 (1964)
- Requiem, after Anna Akhmatova for soprano, tenor and symphony orchestra, Op. 35 (1966)
- Hard Frost, aria for mezzo-soprano and orchestra, Op. 60a (1974)
- Beatrice, choral-symphonic cycle after Dante's "Divine Comedy", Op. 123 (1997)
- The Run of Time, vocal cycle on poems by Anna Akhmatova for soprano and string orchestra, Op. 135b (2003)

=== Vocal ===
- A White Stork, vocal cycle for medium voice and piano, Op. 10 (1958)
- Yuaffu, four choruses for chorus a cappella, Op. 14 No. 1 (1959)
- Energy, fugue for chorus a cappella, Op. 14 No. 2 (1959)
- The Wedding Song for female chorus, Op. 16a (1959)
- Sad Songs, vocal cycle for soprano and piano, Op. 22 (1962)
- Three Songs to Verses by Marina Tsvetaeva for medium voice and piano, Op. 48 (1970)
- Five Songs to Verses by Ovsey Driz for medium voice and piano, Op. 57 (1974)
- The Will for soprano, harp and organ, Op. 96 (1986)
- To My Brother for soprano, flute and harp, Op. 98 (1986)
- The Garden of Music, cantata for soprano, mezzo-soprano, baritone and piano trio, Op. 101 (1987)
- The Chelom Wise Men, a vocal-instrumental quartet for violin, soprano, bass and piano, Op. 112 (1991)
- The Devildraft, cycle for medium voice and piano, Op. 120 (1995)
- Sea Background, three études for low voice and piano on poems by A. Tolstoy, Op. 128 (2000)
- Our Hour of Death is Inevitable, three romances for middle voice and piano on poems by H. Heine, D. Harms and I. Guberman, Op. 129 (2001)
- Simple Truth, three romances on poems by S. Marshak, M. Tsvetaeva and G. Shpalikov. Op. 130 (2001)
- The Run of Time, vocal cycle on poems by Anna Akhmatova for soprano, violin and cello, Op. 135 (2003)
- The Orange, vocal cycle on poems of different poets for soprano, bass and piano, Op. 137 (2004)
- Strong Thoughts, for soloists and chorus a cappella, Op. 145 (2006)

=== Arrangements and orchestrations ===
- L'Incoronazione di Poppea, Orchestration of the opera by C. Monteverdi, Op. 37 (1967)
- Deciphering of Japanese Gagaku, Op.52 (1972)
- Boris Godunov, Orchestration for three Choruses from Prokofiev's Music to Pushkin's Tragedy, Op. 52a (1972)
- Satires, orchestration of Shostakovich's Vocal Cycle to words by S. Chorny, Op. 81 (1980)
- Version of Shostakovich Piano Trio No. 1, Opus 81 Bis (1980)
- Four Verses of Captain Lebyadkin, orchestration of Shostakovich's vocal cycle to words by Dostoyevsky, Op. 97 (1986)
- Antiformalistic Little Paradise (Rayok), Orchestration of Shostakovich vocal cycle, Op. 108 (1989)
- Orchestration of four romances by Grieg, Op. 111 (1991)
- Orchestration of seven songs by Mahler, Op. 115 (1993)
- Five Romances on poems from the magazine „Crocodile“, orchestration of vocal cycle by Shostakovich, Op. 138 (2005)
- Musical Escapade, orchestration of vocal cycle by I. Schlein, Op. 139 (2005)
- Reconstruction of two lost parts of the symphony "Americas" by I. Schlein, Op. 139b (2005)
- Lamento, orchestration of third movement of Piano Sonata No. 29 by Beethoven for harp and string orchestra, Op. 140 (2005)
- Reconstruction of the beginning of Part IV of Symphony No. 2 by I. Schlein, Op. 141 (2005)
- Vocalis Etude, orchestration of piece by Maurice Ravel, Op. 142 (2005) (In the form of Habañera)
