= Four Verses of Captain Lebyadkin =

1974 song cycle by Dmitri Shostakovich

- Song cycle by Dmitri Shostakovich
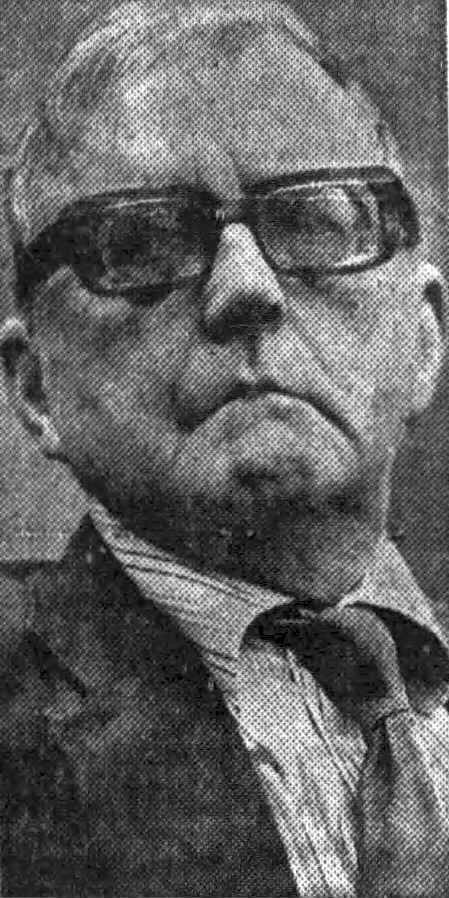
- Shostakovich in June 1973
- Opus: 146
- Text: Fyodor Dostoyevsky; Anonymous
- Language: Russian
- Composed: August 23, 1974
- Published: 1975
- Publisher: Muzyka; Hans Sikorski Musikverlage; Boosey & Hawkes; DSCH Publishers
- Duration: 10 minutes
- Movements: 4
- Scoring: Bass and piano

Premiere
- Date: May 10, 1975
- Location: Small Hall of the Moscow Conservatory; Moscow, Russian SFSR
- Performers: Yevgeny Nesterenko (bass); Yevgeny Shenderovich (piano)

The Four Verses of Captain Lebyadkin (Russian: Четыре стихотворения капитана Лебядкина, romanized: Chetyre stikhotvoreniya kapitana Lebyadkina) by Dmitri Shostakovich is a song cycle composed in 1974. It is his final vocal work.

Despite having a lifelong appreciation for the writings of Fyodor Dostoyevsky, Shostakovich did not embark on a large-scale musical setting of them until the penultimate year of his life, when he became fascinated by Captain Ignat Lebyadkin, a character who affected to be a learned poet in Demons. Shostakovich had read the novel while convalescing in Barvikha. He selected several of his verses from the novel and fashioned them together idiosyncratically for his song cycle.

Yevgeny Nesterenko and Yevgeny Shenderovich premiered the work at the Small Hall of the Moscow Conservatory on May 10, 1975; it was the last time Shostakovich attended a premiere of his own music. The reception from the public and press was muted. Alfred Schnittke, who was in the audience, recalled that the hall was only half full. Krzysztof Meyer called the work "truly astonishing", while Bernd Feuchtner, president of the German Shostakovich Society, described it as a "dark counterpart" to the Suite on Verses of Michelangelo Buonarroti.

== Background ==
Shostakovich had a profound appreciation for Fyodor Dostoyevsky. In 1975, he wrote to a friend:

I love him and admire him as a great artist. I admire his love for people, for the humiliated and the wretched.

In the same letter Shostakovich also said that he "never parted" from his copy of The House of the Dead while composing Lady Macbeth of the Mtsensk District. In spite of this, he had never set any of Dostoyevsky's texts to music, aside from a brief excerpt from The Brothers Karamazov in The Nose. A cue from his 1928 film score to The New Babylon representing the Franco-Prussian War, which juxtaposed "La Marseillaise" with the can-can from Jacques Offenbach's Orpheus in the Underworld, may have been inspired by a reference to a fictitious piano piece with similar characteristics in Dostoyevsky's Demons.

== Composition ==
In 1974, while convalescing in Barvikha, Shostakovich read Demons; he became interested in Captain Ignat Lebyadkin, a character whose verses were described by Sofia Khentova, the composer's official biographer, as a "parody of poetry, the philosophy of a crook". Musicologist Dorothea Redepenning referred to Lebyadkin as "one of the most distasteful figures in Russian literature".

On August 23, 1974, Shostakovich reported in a letter to Isaak Glikman that he had composed "quite a lot recently", and announced that he had completed the Four Verses of Captain Lebyadkin, as well as its predecessor, the Suite on Verses of Michelangelo Buonarroti. Glikman recalled that Shostakovich had been profoundly upset over having "not a single musical thought in his head" during the period immediately preceding his work on these compositions.

In early 1975, Yevgeny Nesterenko and Yevgeny Shenderovich, who Shostakovich chose to premiere the Four Verses of Captain Lebyadkin, received the score. They mostly prepared the premiere apart from each other because of Nesterenko's recurring illnesses. Shenderovich visited Shostakovich in Repino, who was there being treated for a chronic neuro-muscular disorder. The composer described the character of Lebyadkin to him:

You know, Lebyadkin, of course is a buffoon and a laughing stock. But there is something frighteningly creepy about him. Tell this to Nesterenko, maybe it will give him an indication of the image I had in mind.

Nesterenko and Shenderovich later went to Kiev to perform a series of concerts. While there, they began to intensively rehearse for the premiere of the Four Verses of Captain Lebyadkin. Although they had frequently performed Shostakovich's Five Romances on Texts from Krokodil Magazine, which Nesterenko premiered, Shenderovich said the new work "required much more technical mastery, a more incisive satire, and much more subtle innuendo" than the earlier work.

== Music ==
The Four Verses of Captain Lebyadkin, Shostakovich's final song cycle, consists of four songs scored for bass and piano:

1. The Love of Captain Lebyadkin
2. The Cockroach
3. The Charity Ball of the Governesses
4. A Pure Soul

Shostakovich presents the selected verses from Demons out of order and also uses prose excerpts as connective material. Lebyadkin's verses parody the writings of Afanasy Fet and Nestor Kukolnik; they also demonstrate his illiteracy.

The first song, "The Love of Captain Lebyadkin", conflates three strophes that are disparately located within the novel. It describes the titular character's unrequited love for Yelizaveta Nikolayevna Tushina. He views her physical qualities, which inspire him to yearn for "marital and legal delights", as his feminine ideal. In the course of the song, he likens his love to the explosion of a cannonball at the siege of Sevastopol where he had lost his arm, but later contradicts himself by saying he has neither ever visited Sevastopol nor is missing an arm. The song includes quotes from the Prelude No. 15 in D♭ major from Shostakovich's 24 Preludes and Fugues and Peter Ilyich Tchaikovsky's The Queen of Spades. It also includes allusions to Giuseppe Verdi's Rigoletto.

"The Cockroach" is a fable in the style of Ivan Krylov, which tells of flies and a cockroach in a glass being discarded into a trash bin by an old servant. The music is based on the folk song "Chizhik-Pyzhik". In the novel it appears as a dialogue between Lebyadkin and Varvara Petrovna Stavrogina, one of the main characters. At the end of the song, Lebyadkin describes the old servant as an "allegory of nature".

Lebyadkin attacks the institution of marriage in the third song, "The Charity Ball of the Governesses". He refers to virtuous young women from the upper classes as "governesses", who despite their surface affectation of chastity conceal the capacity to become a "little George Sand".

"A Pure Soul" is a strophic song that utilizes an anonymous text referred to in Demons, which satirizes the revolutionary-themed poetry of Nikolay Ogarev. The only song in the cycle with a key signature, B major, it retells the life of a man, "not a gentleman by birth", compelled to leave Russia in order to escape Tsarist persecution and declare "fraternity, equality, and liberty". The song concludes with a rebuke of organized religion, marriage, and the nuclear family.

According to Dorothea Redepenning, the work's form suggests that of a "four-movement symphony, but [with] a total renunciation of motivic interrelationship".

A typical performance lasts approximately 10 minutes. The manuscript score is preserved in the Shostakovich family archives.

=== Orchestration ===
After Shostakovich's death, Boris Tishchenko arranged the piano part for chamber orchestra. This was subsequently published as Op. 146a.

== Premieres ==
The Four Verses of Captain Lebyadkin was premiered at the Small Hall of the Moscow Conservatory by Nesterenko and Shenderovich on May 10, 1975. It was the last time Shostakovich attended a premiere of his own music.

The American premiere took place on October 30, 1983, at Boston University Concert Hall; the performers were bass Robert Osborne and pianist Howard Lubin. The performance was part of a festival devoted to Shostakovich's music that was organized with the assistance of Solomon Volkov.

== Reception ==
In a conversation with Glikman after the premiere, Shostakovich said that he had been pleased with Nesterenko, who "sang extremely well". Shenderovich recalled that the performance was a triumph met with ovations and flowers. Alfred Schnittke had a different perception of the same occasion:

I will never forget being at the last concert that [Shostakovich] attended—in the spring of 1975, the premiere of the Four Verses of Captain Lebyadkin. The hall only half filled. Shostakovich, a premiere, and a half-filled Small Hall of the [Moscow] Conservatory! There was a general impression of exhaustion with Shostakovich. He sort of continued to interest us [young composers] in a coldly objective sense. But at the time there was no longer a burning interest. I had the feeling... that the [Four Verses of Captain Lebyadkin] was all exhausted, written by a man completely of the past, completely belonging to another age. And it appeared to me that many others felt the same. Just over half of the Small Hall at the premiere—that is terrible! I remember that after Yevgeny Nesterenko sang, Shostakovich stood up, but did not go up on stage. He bowed to the audience from his seat—and then turned and made his way for the exit. Even though the program had not yet ended, he left. [His wife] followed him, looking around, and smiling sheepishly. It was a pretty weird experience.

The premiere of the Four Verses of Captain Lebyadkin drew little attention from the press. According to Krzysztof Meyer, "it was evident that no great importance was attributed to it". Musicologist Levon Akopyan ranked it with Shostakovich's Satires, noting that its style of subversive humor, which had made a great impression on the public in the 1960s, had become stale by the 1970s. He called it a "fleeting, insignificant work" and of "rather secondary interest".

Meyer defended the work in his overview of Shostakovich's life and music:

[He] used only a very few strokes to convey the cartoonish image of the madman that was Captain Lebyadkin. The simplicity of the work is fused to a skill and expressive power that are truly astonishing. In Shostakovich, the ridiculous becomes sinister.

Malcolm MacDonald said that Lebyadkin was in the lineage of the Fool from King Lear and suggested that Shostakovich may have felt a greater degree of affinity for the character than may be immediately apparent. Bernd Feuchtner, president of the German Shostakovich Society, called the work a "dark counterpart" to the Suite on Verses of Michelangelo Buonarroti.
