= Musica Angelica Baroque Orchestra =

Musica Angelica is an internationally performing Baroque orchestra based in Long Beach, California and led by music director Martin Haselböck, an Austrian organist, professor, and conductor. Currently oboist and guitarist Gonzalo X. Ruiz functions as the associate director of the ensemble and is set to take over in a year. Musica Angelica is dedicated to the historically informed performance of Baroque and early Classical music on period instruments. Its programs include a mixture of known masterworks by composers such as Bach, Handel and Vivaldi, along with rarely heard compositions spanning two centuries by lesser-known composers.

== History and Musicians ==
Musica Angelica was founded in 1992 by lutenist Michael Eagan and gambist Mark Chatfield. Since its inception, Musica Angelica has produced an annual subscription season of orchestral and chamber concerts in venues throughout greater Los Angeles. In addition, the orchestra performs and collaborates with institutions both in The United States and abroad, including the Long Beach Opera, Los Angeles Master Chorale, Pacific Chorale, Los Angeles Opera, Orange County Philharmonic Society, Mark Morris Dance Group, Orchëster Wiener Akademie, Tölzer Boys Choir, the J. Paul Getty Museum and the Norton Simon Museum. Musica Angelica has also collaborated with artists such as Marion Verbruggen, Suzie LeBlanc, Vittorio Ghielmi, Rachel Podger, Elizabeth Wallfisch, Rinaldo Alessandrini, Giovanni Antonini and Harry Bicket.

Musica Angelica's first international tour, which sold-out performances and was the subject of critical-acclaim, took place in March 2007 in a joint venture with Haselböck's Orchester Wiener Akademie. The ensemble presented 13 performances of Bach's St. Matthew Passion in the U.S., Mexico and Europe. In September and October 2010, the orchestra completed a successful four-country tour of South America as well, with performances taking place in concert halls throughout the continent. In May 2011 the orchestra made its Vienna debut of Bach's Brandenburg Concertos. Musica Angelica has also toured three times throughout South America and most recently presented three opera performances at the Palacio Bellas Artes in Mexico City.

Martin Haselböck would often bring new twists to performances by combining traditional Baroque music with avant-garde multimedia. One of his creations, “The Infernal Comedy,” starring John Malkovich, was premiered by Musica Angelica in Santa Monica and enjoyed 50 repeat performances throughout Europe. In fall of 2011, Musica Angelica toured the Americas with The Infernal Comedy, performing 16 concerts in ten cities to sold-out audiences totaling over 23,000.

In 2007, Musica Angelica raised its profile with a contract for four recordings on the Germany-based New Classical Adventure (NCA) label. The first, released in 2007, is Handel's “Acis and Galatea,” the second, released in 2008, includes the concertos of Telemann featuring the principal players of the orchestra as soloists, the third in the series is composed of Bach cantatas, released in 2009, and the fourth CD in 2010 features principal oboist Gonzalo Ruiz in works for oboe, organ and soprano by Telemann and Hertel.

== Repertoire and Performances ==
The orchestra performs both the well-known pieces and lesser known gems of the baroque and classical eras. In addition to established repertory, Musica Angelica has premiered over ten works in the new-music genre.

The group's 2004 premiere of a 1737 oratorio by Nicola Porpora, Il Gedeone, received positive reviews. Most recently, in March 2009, Musica Angelica performed the North American premiere of Antonio Vivaldi's opera, Motezuma.

Notable performances have included a collaboration with actor John Malkovich, in a one man show portraying Austrian serial killer Jack Unterweger.

In 2015 Musica Angelica performed with Mark Morris Dance Group in a dance interpretation of Purcell's "Dido and Aeneas."

== Recordings ==
The group have released several recordings on the German New Classical Adventure label, including works by Telemann, Handel, and Vivaldi.
