= Requiem (comics) =

Requiem, in comics, may refer to:

- Requiem (DC Comics), a comic book series based on the character Artemis of Bana-Mighdall
- Requiem Chevalier Vampire, a French comics series by Pat Mills, translated and republished by Heavy Metal magazine
- "Requiem", a one-shot tie-in to Final Crisis
- Requiem, a Marvel Comics character and member of the Lost Souls, a faction of the Neo
- The Phoenix Requiem, a fantasy graphic novel by Sarah Ellerton
- Silver Surfer: Requiem, a Marvel Knight's limited series by J. Michael Straczynski
- Ultimate Requiem, a number of one-shots and limited series that marked the end of the Ultimate Marvel line of comics

== See also ==
- Requiem (disambiguation)
