= Yevgeny Nesterenko =

Russian opera singer and professor (1938–2021)

- Евгений Нестеренко
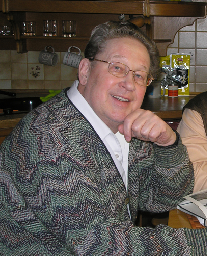
- Nesterenko in 2008
- Born: 8 January 1938; Moscow, Soviet Union
- Died: 20 March 2021 (aged 83); Vienna, Austria
- Education: Saint-Petersburg State University of Architecture and Civil Engineering; Leningrad Conservatory
- Occupations: Operatic bass; Academic teacher
- Organizations: Mariinsky Theatre; Bolshoi Theatre; Moscow Conservatory; Music and Arts University of the City of Vienna

Yevgeny Yevgenievich Nesterenko (Russian: Евгений Евгеньевич Нестеренко; 8 January 1938 – 20 March 2021) was a Soviet and Russian operatic bass. He made an international career, based at the Bolshoi Theatre. He performed a vast repertoire of 50 leading roles, and was known for the title role of Mussorgsky's Boris Godunov. He was active in concert, and composers wrote music for him such as Suite on Verses of Michelangelo by Dmitri Shostakovich. He was a teacher at Moscow Conservatory and the Music and Arts University of the City of Vienna.

== Early life and education ==
Nesterenko was born in Moscow on 8 January 1938 to Yevgeny Nikiforovich Nesterenko (1908–1996), a major general who fought on the Eastern Front during World War II, and Velta Voldemarovna Bauman (1912–1938), who died when Nesterenko was nine months old. Both of his parents had musical talents and passed their love of singing on to their son.

Although Nesterenko participated in his school's choir, he was uncomfortable with his voice, which was already considered low by that age. His father had also played the piano and the guitar, and although Nesterenko attempted to learn the piano, he had quit after a few years, finding the study boring. The family moved to Chelyabinsk in 1949, and an experience with Nikolai Rimsky-Korsakov's The Snow Maiden, held by the Perm Opera and Ballet Theatre, cemented his interest in opera.

Intending to continue in his family's military tradition, Nesterenko moved to Leningrad and enrolled in the Leningrad Civil Engineering Institute (LISI) in 1955, studying under the institute's naval faculty. He continued his interest in singing as a hobby by participating in amateur performances, but eventually enrolled concurrently at the Leningrad Conservatory in 1960 at the suggestion of the LISI choir director.

In 1961, Nesterenko graduated from LISI with a degree in naval civil engineering, and began work as a construction foreman by day while continuing his education at the conservatory by night. He eventually switched to studying full-time at the conservatory, and became the protégé of Vasily Lukanin, graduating in 1965.

== Career ==
While Nesterenko was still studying at the conservatory, he was invited to perform at the Maly Opera Theatre, where he made his debut as Prince Gremin in Pyotr Ilyich Tchaikovsky's Eugene Onegin. (Note: Sources disagree on when Nesterenko made his debut, with values ranging from 1962 to 1965.) After graduation, he continued performing with the troupe while also continuing to study under Lukanin. When Lukanin fell ill in 1967, Nesterenko took over his teaching responsibilities at the conservatory. Nesterenko also joined the Leningrad Opera and Ballet Theatre that year.

In 1970, at the fourth International Tchaikovsky Competition, held in Moscow, Nesterenko tied for first place in the male vocalist category. His victory led to an invitation to the Bolshoi Theatre, which he joined in 1971 and remained in until 2002. His debut at the Bolshoi on 22 June 1972, in Mikhail Glinka's Ruslan and Lyudmila, was what Nesterenko considered his happiest day.

After moving to Moscow, he taught at the Gnessin State Musical College from 1972 to 1974, and then at the Moscow Conservatory from 1975 to 1992, becoming a professor at the latter in 1981. In 1993, Nesterenko began teaching at the Vienna Conservatory, and split his time between Austria and Russia while continuing to work with the Bolshoi Theatre as a vocal consultant.

During his career, Nesterenko performed in over 50 leading bass roles, including almost all of the ones in the Russian operatic repertoire, and performed 21 of them in their original languages. His repertoire included deep bass as well as baritone roles. He has performed on major stages in over a dozen countries, including 56 performances at the Vienna State Opera between 1975 and 1993. He is perhaps best known for his performance as Czar Boris in Modest Mussorgsky's Boris Godunov, for which he won the Golden Viotti medal in 1971. He has also sung in the debut performances of operas by Dmitri Shostakovich, Georgy Sviridov, and Otar Taktakishvili.

Nesterenko has published about 70 recordings, including 20 full operas. He has also published a book, Reflections on the Profession, in 1985, and compiled and edited a book, My Method of Working with Singers, for his mentor Lukanin. He has also published over 200 articles.

=== Select performances ===
He appeared at the Vienna State Opera in roles such as Boris Godunov, Sarastro in Mozart's Die Zauberflöte, Basilio in Rossini's Il barbiere di Siviglia, Méphistophélès in Gounod's Faust, Ramfis in Verdi's Aida, Banquo in Macbeth and Filippo II in Don Carlo, and the Water Goblin in Dvořák's Rusalka.

He premiered both versions of Shostakovich's Suite on Verses of Michelangelo, with the orchestral premiere taking place on 12 October 1975 at the Bolshoi Hall of the Moscow Conservatory, with the All-Union conducted by Maxim Shostakovich. He also premiered his final song cycle, Four Verses of Captain Lebyadkin.1983 television documentary about the singer reflected the friendship of the two men during the composition of the song cycle. In 1985, he was the soloist in Songs and Dances of Death for bass and large orchestra in Moscow, conducted by Gennady Rozhdestvensky.

== Personal life ==
Nestereko was married and had a son. He died on 20 March 2021 in Vienna at the age of 83, after suffering a short but severe case of COVID-19. His family elected to forgo holding a large funeral for him due to the ongoing pandemic, and his ashes were buried in Russia according to his wishes.

== Select awards ==
- Gold medal, International Tchaikovsky Competition, Moscow, 1970
- People's Artist of the USSR, 1976
- Golden Viotti, Italy, 1981
- Lenin Prize, 1982
- Giovanni Zenatello, Italy, 1986
- Hero of Socialist Labour, 1988
- Chaliapin Prize of the Academy of Creativity, Moscow, 1992
- Order of Honour, Russia, 2014
