= Requiem Canticles (disambiguation) =

Requiem Canticles can refer to:

- Requiem Canticles, a composition by Igor Stravinsky, 1966
- Requiem Canticles (Balanchine), a ballet by George Balanchine, 1968
- Requiem Canticles (Robbins), a ballet by Jerome Robbins, 1972

== See also ==
- Requiem (disambiguation)
