= Requiem (Fisher novel) =

1933 novel by A. E. Fisher

- First edition
- Author: A. E. Fisher
- Language: English
- Genre: Novel, Proletarian literature
- Publisher: The John Day Company
- Publication date: 1933
- Publication place: United States
- Media type: Print (hardback)
- Pages: 277
- OCLC: 3721369
- Preceded by: Marriage in Blue
- Followed by: Amazon Key

Requiem is a novel by the American writer A. E. Fisher set during the Great Depression in Pittsburgh, Pennsylvania. It tells the story of a week in the life of a family of six struggling to survive.

Requiem was published in 1933 by The John Day Company. Fisher's last novel, "Marriage in Blue," was a slightly Hemingway tale of American expatriates abroad.
