= Requiem (Tishchenko) =

1966 composition by Boris Tischenko

Requiem is a 1966 composition by Boris Tischenko, to texts from the poetic cycle of the same name by Anna Akhmatova for soprano, tenor and symphony orchestra, Op. 35. The work was kept unperformed and finally premiered 23 years later in June 1989 in the Great Hall of the Leningrad State Philharmonic.
