= Suite on Verses of Michelangelo Buonarroti =

1974 song cycle by Dmitri Shostakovich

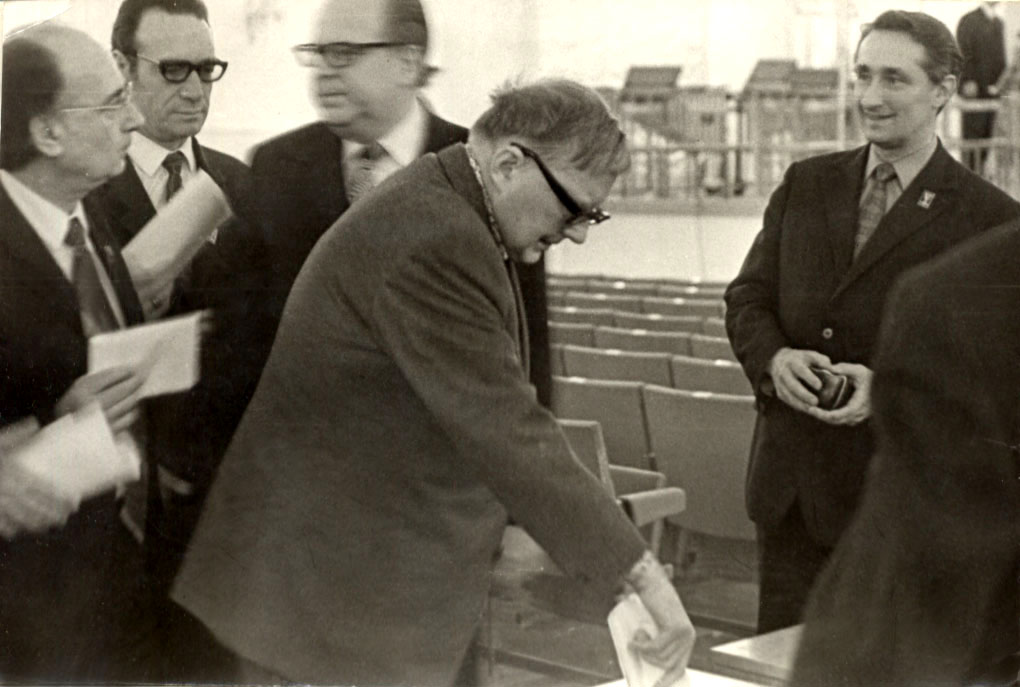
Dmitri Shostakovich in 1974, around the period he composed the Suite on Verses by Michelangelo Buonarotti (photograph by Yuri Shcherbinin)

The Suite on Verses of Michelangelo Buonarroti (Russian: Сюита на слова Микеланджело Буонарроти, Op.145, 1974) is a cycle of song settings by Dmitri Shostakovich of eleven poems by Michelangelo Buonarroti, translated into the Russian language by Avram Efros. The original version (Op.145) is for bass voice and piano; the composer also produced an orchestrated version (145a).

Shostakovich started work on the songs after coming across Efros' recently published volume of the poems. Shostakovich was dissatisfied with Efros' translations and privately asked the poet Andrei Voznesensky to see about making some new translations. Nevertheless it was premiered, using Efros' texts, on 23 December 1974 in Leningrad by the bass Yevgeny Nesterenko and pianist Yevgeny Shenderovich.

During rehearsals for the orchestral version, Opus 145a, in October 1975, Maxim Shostakovich disclosed to Yevgeni Nesterenko that his father considered this composition to take the place of the Sixteenth Symphony in his oeuvre.

== See also ==
- List of compositions by Dmitri Shostakovich#Vocal
