= Orchester Wiener Akademie =

Orchester Wiener Akademie was founded in 1985 by the organist and director Martin Haselböck. This association is internationally known because of its vast repertoire, including pieces from the Baroque until the end of Romanticism.

The orchestra has been recognized because of its work in the exploration of classical and romantic repertoires, as well as techniques and styles of those times. The Wiener Akademie interprets the works of famous composers in their original styles and sounds, using the instruments on which the works were supposed to have been originally played.

== Performances ==
The Orchester Wiener Akademie is presented regularly in Vienna with their annual Musikverein concert series and in some of the most prestigious festivals, such as Frankfurt, Schleswig-Holstein, Internationale Bachakademie Stuttgart, Klangbogen, the Carinthischer Sommer, Cuenca Festival, Handel Festival Halle and the Festival Internacional Cervantino.

The association is the resident-orchestra of the International Festival of Liszt, whose mission is to perform and record the whole repertoire of orchestral music from Franz Liszt. Its first release, The Sound of Weimar, was in January 2011. It included the Dante Symphony and honored the 200th anniversary of Liszt's birth. The Sound of Weimar was awarded the "Grand Prix du Disque Franz Liszt" twice.

For the Orchestra, the opera is an important genre. It has recently interpreted works by Mozart, Schubert and Haydn, such as Symphony No. 40 (Mozart), Symphony No. 5 (Schubert), and Symphony No. 6 (Haydn).

Since 2009, the Orchestra has collaborated with John Malkovich in the plays The Infernal Comedy and The Giacomo Variations.

== Discography ==
The Orchester Wiener Akademie has recorded more than 30 discs, which include a variety of pieces like the Schubert masses, the First Symphony of Bruckner, and the three symphonies Times of the day of Haydn (no. 6, 7, 8). Their productions include:

- The Giacomo Variations (2011)
- The Infernal Comedy (2010)
- Ludwig van Beethoven: Fidelio (2008)
- Johann Strauss: Dance and Dream
- Franz Liszt: The Sound of Weimar (2011-2012)
