= Martin Haselböck =

Austrian musical director

Martin Haselböck (born 23 November 1954, Vienna, Austria) is the Austrian musical director of Musica Angelica in Long Beach, California, United States, and the musical director and founder of the Orchester Wiener Akademie. He is also a professor at the University of Music and Performing Arts Vienna, where he teaches organ.

== Decorations and awards ==
- Austrian Cross of Honour for Science and Art (1997)
- Prague Mozart Prize (1991)
- Hungarian Liszt Prize
- Grand Decoration of Honour for Services to the Republic of Austria (2010)
