= List of compositions by Hans Werner Henze =

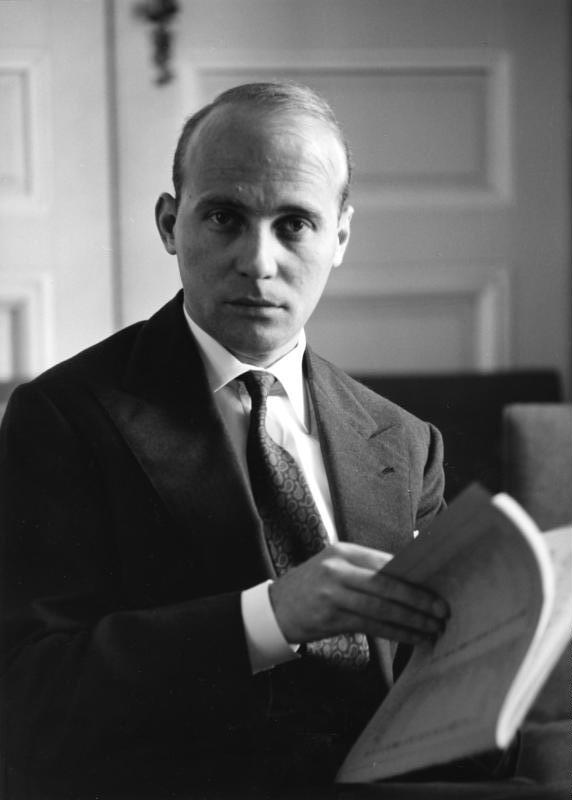
Hans Werner Henze in 1960

This is a list of compositions by Hans Werner Henze (1926–2012). Many of them are published by Schott Music. Source:

== Operas, music-theatre and other dramatic works ==
- Das Wundertheater (1948, première 1949)
- Die Gefangenen (1950)
- Boulevard Solitude (1951, première 1952)
- Ein Landarzt, radio opera (1951; stage version 1964, première 1965; revised 1994)
- Der tolle Tag (1951; withdrawn)
- Sodom und Gomorrha (1952)
- Das Ende einer Welt, radio opera (1953; stage version 1964, première 1965; revised 1993)
- König Hirsch (1952–55, première 1956; revised 1962 as Il re cervo oder Die Irrfahrten der Wahrheit (première 1963)
- Der sechste Gesang (1955)
- Die Zikaden (1955; withdrawn)
- Der Prinz von Homburg (1958, première 1960; new orchestration 1991)
- Elegy for Young Lovers (Elegie für junge Liebende) (1959–61, première 1961; revised 1987)
- Les caprices de Marianne (1962; withdrawn)
- Muriel ou Le temps d'un retour (1963; film score)
- Der Frieden (1964)
- The Bassarids (Die Bassariden) (1964–65, première 1966)
- Der junge Lord (1964, première 1965)
- Der junge Törless (1966; film score)
- Moralities (1967, premiere 1968; revised 1970)
- Das Floß der Medusa (1968, oratorio)
- El Cimarrón (1970–1971, musical work)
- Der langwierige Weg in die Wohnung der Natascha Ungeheuer (1971)
- La Cubana, oder Ein Leben für die Kunst (1973, première 1974; chamber version La piccola Cubana 1990-91)
- We Come to the River (1974–76, première 1976)
- The Lost Honour of Katharina Blum (1975; film score)
- Good-for-Nothing (1978; film score)
- The Woman (1978; withdrawn)
- Orpheus (1978; Viennese version 1986)
- Pollicino (1979–80, première 1980)
- Montezuma (1980; a film score)
- The English Cat (1980–83, première 1983; revised 1990)
- Nach Lissabon (1982)
- Un amour de Swann (1983; film score)
- L'amour à mort (1984)
- Das verratene Meer (1986–89, Deutsche Oper Berlin, 5 May 1990)
- Gogo No Eiko (1990, première of the first version in German, Deutsche Oper Berlin, 2006, première of the second version in Japanese, Salzburger Festspiele)
- Venus und Adonis (1993–95, Bavarian State Opera, Munich, 11 January 1997)
- L'Upupa und der Triumph der Sohnesliebe (2000–03, Salzburg Festival, 12 August 2003)
- Phaedra (Berlin State Opera, 6 September 2007)
- Gisela! oder: die merk- und denkwürdigen Wege des Glücks (Ruhrtriennale, September 2010)

== Ballets ==
- Ballet-Variationen (1949, first staged 1958; revised 1992)
- Jack Pudding (1949, premiere 1950; withdrawn)
- Das Vokaltuch der Kammersängerin Rosa Silber (1950, first staged 1958; revised 1990)
- Le Tombeau d'Orphée (1950, withdrawn)
- Labyrinth (1951, premiere 1952; revised 1996)
- Der Idiot (1952, premiere 1952; revised 1990)
- Pas d’action (1952; withdrawn)
- Maratona (1956, premiere 1957)
- Undine (1956-7, premiere 1958)
- L’usignolo dell’imperatore (1959, premiere 1959)
- Tancredi (1964, premiere 1966)
- Orpheus (1978, premiere 1979)
- Le disperazioni del Signor Pulcinella, libretto by Sergio Sivori, (1992-5, premiere 1997; this ballet is an extended and revised version of Jack Pudding)
- Le fils de l'air (1995-6, premiere 1997)

== Orchestral ==
- Symphonies
  - Symphony no. 1 (1947; revised 1963, 1991, and 2005—the last version renamed Kammerkonzert 05)
  - Symphony no. 2 (1949)
  - Symphony no. 3 (1949–50)
  - Symphony no. 4 (1955)
  - Symphony no. 5 (1962)
  - Symphony no. 6 (1969; revised 1994)
  - Symphony no. 7 (1983–84)
  - Symphony no. 8 (1992–93)
  - Symphony no. 9 (1995–97)
  - Symphony no. 10 (1997–2000)
- Kammerkonzert (1946)
- Suite (1949)
- Sinfonische Variationen (1950; withdrawn)
- Sinfonische Zwischenspiele (1951)
- Tancredi (1952)
- Tanz und Salonmusik (1952; revised 1989)
- Vokalsinfonie (1955; this is taken from König Hirsch)
- Quattro poemi (1955)
- Sinfonische Etüden (1956; revised as Drei sinfonische Etüden in 1964)
- Maratona (1956)
- Jeux des Tritons (1956–57; revised 1967)
- Hochzeitsmusik (1957)
- Sonata per archi (1957–58)
- Drei Dithyramben (1958)
- Trois pas des Triton (1958)
- Undine, Suite no. 1 (1958)
- Undine, Suite no. 2 (1958)
- Antifone (1960)
- Los caprichos (1963)
- Zwischenspiele (1964)
- Mänadentanz (1965)
- In memoriam: die weisse Rose (1965)
- Fantasia for Strings (1966)
- Telemanniana (1967)
- Compases para preguntas ensimismadas (1969–70)
- Heliogabalus imperator, allegoria per musica (1971–72; revised 1986)
- Tristan (1972–3)
- Ragtimes and Habaneras (1975)
- Aria de la folía española (1977)
- Il Vitalino raddoppiato (1977)
- Apollo trionfante (1979)
- Arien des Orpheus (1979)
- Barcarola (1979)
- Dramatische Szenen aus ‘Orpheus’ I (1979)
- Spielmusiken (1979–80)
- Deutschlandsberger Mohrentanz no. 1 (1984)
- Kleine Elegien (1984–85)
- Deutschlandsberger Mohrentanz no. 2 (1985)
- Fandango (1986 with Daniel Barenboim; revised 1992)
- Cinque piccoli concerti e ritornelli (1987)
- La selva incantata, aria and rondo (1991)
- Introduktion, Thema und Variationen (1992)
- Appassionatamente (1993–4)
- Seconda sonata per archi (1995)
- Voie lactée ô soeur lumineuse for chamber orchestra (1996)
- Erlkönig, fantasia (1996)
- Pulcinellas Erzählungen (1996)
- Sieben Boleros (1996)
- Zigeunerweisen und Sarabanden (1996)
- Fraternité, air (1999)
- A Tempest, rounds (2000)
- Scorribanda Sinfonica (2000–01)
- L’heure bleue (2001)
- Sebastian im Traum (2004)
- Fünf Botschaften für die Königin von Saba (2004)

== Concertante ==
- Piano
  - Piano Concertino (1947)
  - Piano Concerto No. 1 (1950)
  - Piano Concerto No. 2 (1967)
- Violin
  - Violin Concerto No. 1 (1947)
  - Violin Concerto No. 2 (1971; revised 1991)
  - Violin Concerto No. 3 Three Portraits from Doktor Faustus (1996)
- Ode an den Westwind for cello and orchestra (1953)
- Double Bass Concerto (1966)
- Double Concerto for oboe, harp and strings (1966)
- Englische Liebeslieder for cello and orchestra (1984–85)
- Requiem: 9 geistliche Konzerte for piano, trumpet and chamber orchestra (1990–93)
- Drei geistliche Konzerte, for trumpet and orchestra (1992)

== Choral ==
- Fünf Madrigäle (1947)
- Chor gefangener Trojer (1948; revised 1964)
- Wiegenlied der Mutter Gottes (1948)
- Jüdische Chronik (1960)
- Novae de infinito laudes (1962)
- Cantata della fiaba estrema (1963)
- Lieder von einer Insel (1964)
- Musen Siziliens (1966)
- Das Floß der Medusa (1968; revised 1990)
- Mad People's Madrigal (1974–6)
- Orpheus Behind the Wire (1981–3)
- Hirtenlieder (1993–5)
- Elogium Musicum (2008, in memory of Henze's partner Fausto Moroni)
- Der Opfergang (2010)
- An den Wind (2011)

== Vocal ==
- Sechs Lieder (1945; withdrawn)
- Whispers from Heavenly Death (1948; revised 1999)
- Der Vorwurf (1948; withdrawn)
- Apollo et Hyazinthus (1948–9)
- Chanson Pflastersteine (1950; withdrawn)
- Fünf neapolitanische Lieder (1956)
- Nachtstücke und Arien (1957)
- Kammermusik 1958 (1958; revised 1963)
- Drei Fragmente nach Hölderlin (1958)
- Three Arias (1960; revised 1993)
- Ariosi (1963)
- Being Beauteous (1963)
- Ein Landarzt (1964)
- Versuch über Schweine (1968)
- El Cimarrón (1969–70)
- Voices (1973)
- Heb doch die Stimme an (1975)
- Kindermund (1975)
- El rey de Harlem (1979)
- Three Auden Songs (1983)
- Drei Lieder über den Schnee (1989)
- An Sascha (1991)
- Zwei Konzertarien (1991)
- Lieder und Tänze (1992–3)
- Heilige Nacht (1993)
- Heimlich zur Nacht (1994)
- Nocturnal Serenade (1996)
- Sechs Gesänge aus dem Arabischen (1997–8)

== Chamber ==
- String Quartets
  - String Quartet No. 1 (1947)
  - String Quartet No. 2 (1952)
  - String Quartet No. 3 (1975–76)
  - String Quartet No. 4 (1976)
  - String Quartet No. 5 (1976)
- Kammersonate, for piano trio (1948; revised 1963)
- Wind Quintet (1952)
- L'usignolo dell'imperatore for 9 players (1959)
- Quattro fantasie for octet (1963)
- Der junge Törless for string sextet (1966)
- Fragmente aus einer Show for brass quintet (1971)
- Carillon, Récitatif, Masque for mandolin, guitar and harp (1974)
- Amicizia!, quintet for clarinet, trombone, cello, percussion and piano (1976)
- L'autunno for wind quintet (1977)
- Trauer-Ode für Margaret Geddes, for six cellos (1977)
- Le miracle de la rose (Imaginäres Theater II), for clarinet and 13 musicians (1981)
- Canzona for oboe, piano, harp, 3 violas and cello (1982)
- Sonata for 8 Brass Instruments, for piccolo trumpet, 2 trumpets, flugelhorn, bass trumpet, 2 trombones, and bass trombone (1983)
- Sonata for flute, clarinet, violin, cello, percussion, and piano [from film score L'amour à mort] (1984)
- Selbst- und Zwiegespräche, trio for viola, guitar and small organ (1984–85)
- Ode an eine Äolsharfe, for guitar and 15 instruments (1985–86)
- Allegra e Boris for violin and viola (1987)
- Paraphrasen über Dostojewsky, for speaker and 11 instruments (1990)
- Piano Quintet (1990–91)
- Adagio, adagio, for piano trio (1993)
- Notturno for ten winds, piano and double bass (1995)
- Leçons de danse for piano, harp (or 2 pianos) and percussion (1996)
- Minotauros Blues, for six percussionists (1996)
- Neue Volkslieder und Hirtengesänge, for bassoon, guitar and string trio (1996)
- Ein kleines Potpourri, for flute, vibraphone, harp, and piano (2000) [from the opera Boulevard Solitude]

== Instrumental ==
- Violin Sonata (1946)
- Flute Sonatina (1947)
- Serenade, for cello (1949)
- Drei Tentos, for guitar (1958; from Kammermusik)
- Memorias de ‘El Cimarrón’, for guitar (1970)
- Prison Song, for percussion and tape (1971)
- Sonatina for Solo Trumpet (1974)
- Royal Winter Music, Sonata No. 1, for guitar (1975–6)
- Capriccio, for cello (1976; revised 1981)
- Sonata, for violin (1976–7; revised 1992)
- S. Biagio 9 agosto ore 12.07, for double bass (1977)
- Five Scenes from the Snow Country, for marimba (1978)
- Viola Sonata (1978–79)
- Violin Sonatina (1979) [from the opera Pollicino]
- Epitaph, for cello (1979)
- Etude philarmonique, for violin (1979)
- Royal Winter Music, Sonata No. 2, for guitar (1979)
- Drei Märchenbilder, for guitar (1980; from Pollicino)
- Serenade, for violin (1986)
- Für Manfred, for violin (1989)
- Fünf Nachtstücke for violin and piano (1990)
- An Brenton, for viola (1993)

== Keyboard ==
- Piano Sonatina (1947)
- Variationen, for piano (1949)
- Piano Sonata (1959)
- Six Absences, for harpsichord (1961)
- Lucy Escott Variations, for harpsichord or piano (1963)
- Divertimenti, for 2 pianos (1964)
- Margareten-Walzer, for piano (1978)
- Toccata senza fuga, for organ (1979; from Orpheus)
- Sechs Stücke für junge Pianisten, for piano (1980; from Orpheus)
- Cherubino, 3 miniatures for piano (1980–81)
- Euridice, for harpsichord (1981; revised 1992; from Pollicino)
- Une petite phrase, for piano (1984; from the film score for Un amour de Swann)
- La mano sinistra, for piano left hand (1988)
- Piece for Peter, for piano (1988)
- Clavierstück, for piano (1989)
- Das Haus Ibach, for piano (1991)
- Pulcinella disperato, fantasia, arrangement for piano (1991–2; from Le disperazioni del Signor Pulcinella))
- Für Reinhold, for piano (1994)
- Toccata mistica, for piano (1994)
- Serenata notturna, for piano (1996; arrangement of Notturno)
- Olly on the Shore, for piano (2001)
- Scorribanda pianistica, for piano (2003)

== Arrangements ==
- Die schlafende Prinzessin (1951; withdrawn)
- Don Chisciotte (1976)
- Jephte (orat, orch of Carissimi) (1976)
- Wesendonck-Lieder (1976)
- Il ritorno d'Ulisse in patria (1981)
- I sentimenti di Carl Philipp Emanuel Bach (1982)
- Der Mann, der vom Tode auferstand (1988)
- Fürwahr ...?! (1988)
- Drei Mozartsche Orgelsonaten (1991)
- Il re Teodoro in Venezia (1991–2)
- Drei Orchesterstücke (1995)
- Richard Wagnersche Klavierlieder (1998–9)
