= Sarah Walker (mezzo-soprano) =

British mezzo-soprano

Sarah Elizabeth Royle Walker CBE (born 11 March 1943) is an English mezzo-soprano.

Walker was born in Cheltenham, Gloucestershire. She studied at the Royal College of Music from 1961 to 1965, initially as a violinist and cellist, and went on to study singing with Vera Rózsa. She has appeared in numerous opera performances and is also known as a concert soloist and recitalist.

== Operatic career ==
Walker's operatic debut was in 1969, as Ottavia in Kent Opera's production of L'incoronazione di Poppea. She has also appeared in Britain with Glyndebourne Festival Opera, The Royal Opera, English National Opera, Scottish Opera, and abroad at The Metropolitan Opera (New York City), Lyric Opera of Chicago, San Francisco Opera, La Monnaie (Brussels) and the Vienna State Opera.

Notable roles have included the title-roles in Gloriana and Maria Stuarda, Dido in Les Troyens and Baba the Turk in The Rake's Progress. She recorded the challenging Voices under the direction of its composer, Hans Werner Henze, in 1978.

In 1989, Walker, along with June Anderson (Coloratura Soprano), Klaus König (tenor), and Jan-Hendrik Rootering (bass-baritone), under the baton of Leonard Bernstein, gave a performance of Beethoven's 9th Symphony. The performance, at Christmas, marked the fall earlier that year of the Berlin Wall. These four soloists were accompanied by a massive choir and orchestra made up of many nationalities: from Germany, the Bavarian Radio Symphony Orchestra and Chorus, the Chorus of the Berlin Radio Symphony Orchestra, and members of the Sächsische Staatskapelle Dresden; from the Soviet Union, members of the Orchestra of the Kirov Theatre, from the United Kingdom, members of the London Symphony Orchestra; from the USA, members of the New York Philharmonic, and from France, members of the Opéra de Paris.

== Rule Britannia 1985 ==
She performed a widely acclaimed rendition of Rule Britannia at The Last Night of the Proms in 1985.

https://www.youtube.com/watch?v=f10I9n-G0Nc

== Other activities ==
Her professional debut in recital was reportedly at the Wigmore Hall, and she has since toured Europe, the Americas, Australia and elsewhere. Walker is Prince Consort Professor of Singing at the Royal College of Music and runs the "Creative Voices" course at the Guildhall School of Music & Drama. She is a Fellow of both colleges. She also is on the Vocal Faculty at the Royal Academy of Music. Walker is an advocate of lieder singing and the song repertoire, and is a patron of the London Song Festival, founded in 2007 to promote the song repertoire. In the late 1980s, she collaborated with French & Saunders for their opera diva sketch singing their version of "I Should Be So Lucky" (original by Kylie Minogue) with Sarah as lead.

== Recordings ==
Her recordings include song recitals of works by Fauré with the Nash Ensemble, Schubert, Schumann, Brahms and Dvořák songs, and French songs by Duparc, Enesco, Roussel and Debussy with Roger Vignoles; The Rake's Progress conducted by Riccardo Chailly, the Mozart Requiem conducted by George Guest, Tippett's The Mask of Time conducted by Andrew Davis, Vaughan Williams's Hugh the Drover conducted by Matthew Best and a CD of comic songs ranging from Gershwin to Schoenberg, recorded at the Wigmore Hall in 1988, entitled 'Blah Blah Blah and other trifles'. She appears as Cornelia in the ENO production of Handel's Julius Caesar conducted by Charles Mackerras and directed by John Copley.

== Sources ==
- Who's Who in British Opera ed. Nicky Adam (Scolar Press, 1993) ISBN 0-85967-894-6
