= Ernst Schnabel =

German writer

Ernst Schnabel (26 September 1913 – 25 January 1986) was a German writer and pioneer of the radio documentary (feature). From 1951 to 1955 he was director of the Nordwestdeutscher Rundfunk (NWDR), German public broadcasting organization.

In 1947 and 1950 Schnabel "called on listeners to the North-West German radio station (NWDR) to cooperate in his features. His success points to a potential for further work in this sphere that has scarcely been tapped since then: 35,000 and 80,000 listeners respectively took part, with experiences, notes and references, in Schnabel's broadcasts, which in this way became their own."

His first feature was Der 29. Januar 1947 (1947), issued as audiobook in 1988. The oratorio Das Floß der Medusa (The Raft of the Medusa) by the German composer Hans Werner Henze is based on Schnabel's libretto.

== Works ==
- Anne Frank: A Portrait in Courage. New York 1958.
- Story for Icarus. Projects, incidents, and conclusions from the life of D., engineer. New York 1961.

== Selected filmography ==
Screenwriter

- In Those Days (1947)
