= Vokalsinfonie =

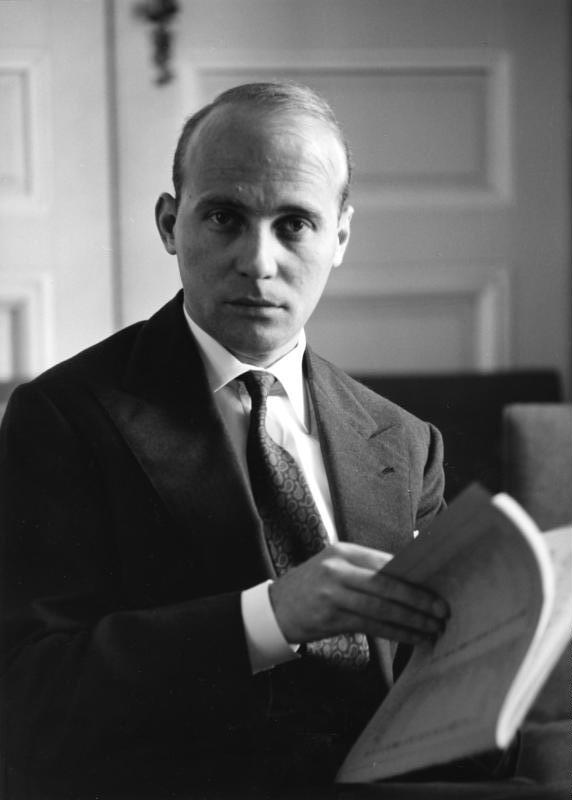
Hans Werner Henze in 1960

The Vokalsinfonie by Hans Werner Henze was written in 1955. The sung text is by German writer Heinz von Cramer. Like his fourth symphony, the Vokalsinfonie is derived from Henze's opera König Hirsch (King Stag). It is composed for ten solo singers who perform roles from the opera:

- Scollatella I–IV – Sopranos
- König (King) – Tenor
- Stimmen des Waldes (Voices of the Woods) – soprano, mezzo-soprano, alto, tenor and bass

The orchestra consists of 3 flutes (no. 3 doubling piccolo), 2 oboes, cor anglais, 2 clarinets, bass clarinet, 2 bassoons, contrabassoon, 4 horns, 3 trumpets, 2 trombones, tuba, glockenspiel, vibraphone, triangle, mandolin, harp, celesta, piano and strings.

It is in five movements:

1. Genesi (Genesis)
2. Introduzione e Sonata (Introduction and Sonata)
3. Variazioni (Variations)
4. Capriccio
5. Ricercar

A typical performance lasts approximately 20 minutes.
