= Ingo Metzmacher =

German conductor

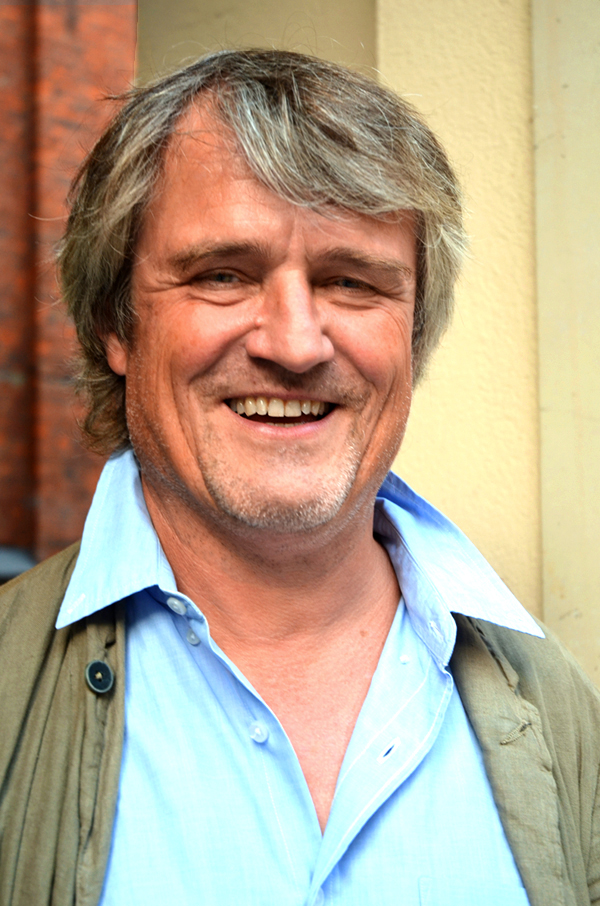
- Metzmacher, 2018
- Born: 10 November 1957; Hanover, Lower Saxony, Germany
- Occupation: Conductor
- Organizations: Bamberg Symphony; Hamburg State Opera; Deutsches Symphonie-Orchester Berlin

Ingo Metzmacher (born 10 November 1957) is a German conductor and artistic director of the festival KunstFestSpiele Herrenhausen in Hanover.

== Life ==
Metzmacher was born in Hanover, the son of the cellist Rudolf Metzmacher and the research biologist Lore Schoen. His musical education in piano, music theory and conducting was in Hanover, Salzburg and Cologne. He later joined the Ensemble Modern in 1980 as its pianist and became the orchestra's conductor in 1985. In 1987 he gave his opera debut at the Oper Frankfurt.

In 1994 Metzmacher conducted the premiere of the revised version of Henze's Symphony No. 6. In 1997 he conducted the world premiere of Henze's Symphony No. 9 at the composer's request.

Between 1995 and 1999 he was principal guest conductor of the Bamberg Symphony and from 1997 to 2005 he served as general music director of the City of Hamburg, which covered the Hamburg State Opera and its Philharmonic Orchestra. In 2005 the Hamburg State Opera was voted Opera House of the Year by the leading German opera magazine, Opernwelt. Metzmacher left his post in Hamburg after disputes with the city over funding.

In 2005 he became chief conductor of De Nederlandse Opera (DNO) in Amsterdam. In February 2007 the opera announced that Metzmacher would step down from his post as DNO's chief conductor in 2008. From 2007 to 2010 he was the chief conductor and artistic director of the Deutsches Symphonie-Orchester Berlin (DSO-Berlin). His original contract with the DSO-Berlin was through 2011. However, after reports of disputes over financing and a threatened reduction in the size of the orchestra, in March 2009 Metzmacher announced his early resignation from the DSO-Berlin principal conductorship as of the summer of 2010. His final concerts as the orchestra's principal conductor were in June 2010 in Berlin and in August 2010 at the BBC Proms at the Royal Albert Hall.

Ingo Metzmacher is regularly conducting at leading opera houses, including the Royal Opera House Covent Garden, Zurich Opera House, La Scala, Teatro Real, Vienna State Opera, Berlin State Opera, Paris Opera and Geneva Opera.

He has led orchestras such as the Berlin Philharmonic, Vienna Philharmonic, Royal Concertgebouw Orchestra, Chicago Symphony Orchestra, Czech Philharmonic, Russian National Orchestra, St. Petersburg Philharmonic, London Philharmonic Orchestra, BBC Symphony Orchestra, Orchestre de Paris, Vienna Symphony Orchestra, and New Japan Philharmonic.

== Recordings ==
- Shostakovich: Lady Macbeth of Mtsensk (with Angela Denoke, Misha Didyk, Kurt Rydl, Marian Talaba, Nadia Krasteva, Chorus and Orchestra of the Vienna State Opera; Orfeo, 2011)
- Franz Schubert: Heliopolis (Matthias Goerne, baritone; Ingo Metzmacher, piano; harmonia mundi, 2009)
- Messiaen: Éclairs Sur L'Au-Delà... (with Vienna Philharmonic; Kairos, 2008)
- Alban Berg: Wozzeck (with Bo Skovhus, Angela Denoke, Frode Olsen, Chris Merritt, Jan Blinkhof, Jürgen Sacher, Choir of the Hamburg State Opera, Philharmonic State Orchestra Hamburg; EMI Classics, 1999)
- Henze: Symphony No. 9 (with Berlin Philharmonic; EMI Classics, 1998)
- Luigi Nono: Prometeo. Tragedia Dell'Ascolto (with Ingrid Ade-Jesemann, Monika Bair-Ivenz, Peter Hall, Solistenchor Freiburg, Ensemble Modern; Ricordi/EMI Classics, 1995)
- Henze: Requiem (with Ueli Wiget, Håkan Hardenberger, Ensemble Modern; Sony Classical, 1994)
- Conlon Nancarrow: Studies (with Ensemble Modern; BMG, 1993)
- Charles Ives: A Portrait (with Ensemble Modern; EMI, 1992)
- Complete symphonies of Karl Amadeus Hartmann, recorded with the Bamberg Symphony between 1993 and 1997.

== Books ==
- Metzmacher, Ingo (2005). Keine Angst vor neuen Tönen (in German). Berlin: Rowohlt. ISBN 978-3-87134-478-7.
- Metzmacher, Ingo (2009). Vorhang auf! (in German). Berlin: Rowohlt Berlin. ISBN 978-3-87134-576-0.

== Awards and honors ==
- 1996: Preis der Deutschen Schallplattenkritik for Luigi Nono's Prometeo (with Ingrid Ade-Jesemann, Monika Bair-Ivenz, Peter Hall, Solistenchor Freiburg and Ensemble Modern)
- 1998: Preis der Deutschen Schallplattenkritik for the complete recording of Karl Amadeus Hartmann's symphonies (with the Bamberg Symphony)
- 1998: ECHO Klassik, Conductor of the Year
- 1998: Opernwelt, Conductor of the Year
- 1999: Niedersachsenpreis for Culture
- 2000: ECHO Klassik, Symphonic Recording (with Philharmonic State Orchestra Hamburg)
- 2009: Praetorius Music Prize awarded by the Ministry of Culture and Science of Lower Saxony
- 2010: Opernwelt, Conductor of the Year

Cultural offices
Preceded by Gerd Albrecht	Music Director, Hamburg State Opera; 1997–2005	Succeeded by Simone Young
Preceded by Edo de Waart	Chief Conductor, De Nederlandse Opera; 2005–2008	Succeeded by Marc Albrecht
Preceded by Kent Nagano	Principal Conductor, Deutsches Symphonie-Orchester Berlin; 2007–2010	Succeeded by Tugan Sokhiev
