= Gaston Salvatore =

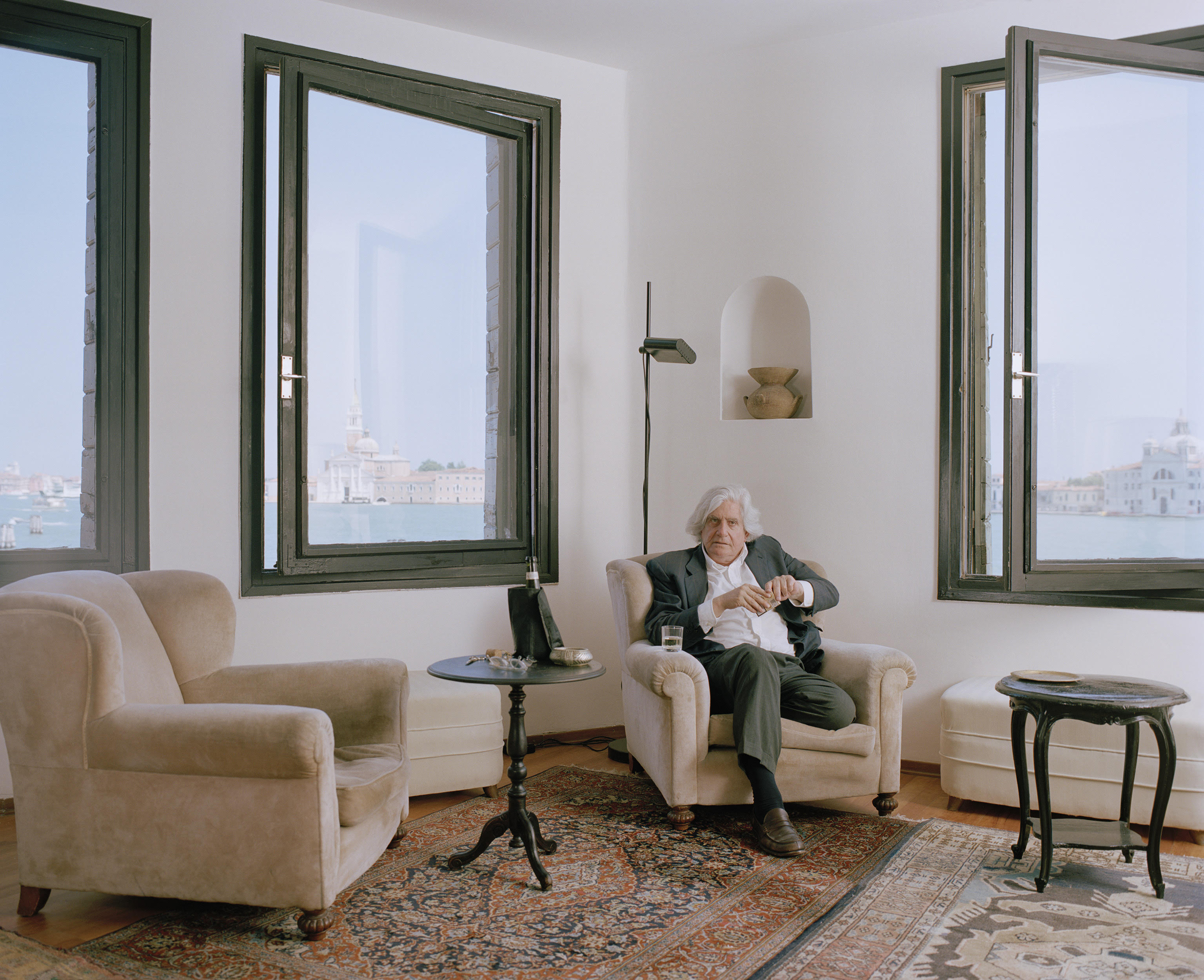
Gaston Salvatore, Venice 2010, photo by Oliver Mark

Gaston Salvatore (29 September 1941 – 11 December 2015) was a Chilean writer living in Germany and writing in the German language.

Salvatore was born in Valparaíso. Among other things, he is known for his collaborations with Hans Werner Henze, including Compases para preguntas ensimismadas and Der langwierige Weg in die Wohnung der Natascha Ungeheuer.

In 1967, he and Rudi Dutschke translated Che Guevara's "Message to the Tricontinental" into German, for which they wrote an introduction.

He and Hans Magnus Enzensberger jointly founded the journal TransAtlantik in 1980.

In 1991 he won the Kleist Prize.
