= Michalis Katsaros =

Greek poet

Michalis Katsaros (Greek: Μιχάλης Κατσαρός; 1919–1998) was a Greek poet.

== The War ==
During The occupation of Greece 1941-1944 (Greek: Η Κατοχή, I Katochi, meaning "The Occupation") he joined the EAM and Communist Party of Greece. Michalis Katsaros after the war passed through a painful silence, as all the poetries in his generation, in the way he spent himself in successive collections.

== Post-War life ==
He was married with the painter Koula Maragopoulou. In 1945 he moved to Athens and lived for many years in difficult conditions, exerting various livelihood occupations like cashier at a merchant, journalist illegal press and the radio officer. He collaborated with the magazines "Foundation" (1947), "Poetic Art", "The New Greek", "Athenian Letters" and "Target" (1950) and in 1975 published the magazine "System", where he published mainly own work.

== Works ==
=== Poetry ===
- My shape ("Τὸ σχῆμα μου")
- My covenant ("Ἡ διαθήκη μου")
- Resist ("Ἀντισταθεῖτε")
- What you see ("Αὐτοὺς ποὺ βλέπεις")
- The sea ("Ἡ Θαλασσινή")
- We will wait ("Θὰ σᾶς περιμένω")
- Against Sadducees ("Κατὰ Σαδδουκαίων" 1953 )
- Less eggs ("Μεῖον ὠά")
- Do not leave ("Μὴ φύγεις")
- Servant ("Ὁ Δοῦλος")
- Lakis ("Ὁ Λάκης")
- Father with harmonica ("Ὁ πατέρας μὲ τὴ φυσαρμόνικα")
- Home ("Σπίτι")
- In stones ("Στὰ λιθάρια")
- On your Earth ("Στὴ γῆ σου")
- Your image ("Τὴν εἰκόνα σου")
- The lamb ("Τὸ ἀρνί")
- Plateau ("Οροπέδιο" 1956)
- Mesologgi ("Μεσολογγι" 1949)
- Writing ("Σύγγραμμα" 1975)
- Modern brochure ("Σύγχρονες Μπροσούρες" 1977)
- Garments ("Εδύματα" 1977)

=== Music ===
His work was turned into music by the famous Greek composer Mikis Theodorakis, A.Kounadis and G. Markopoulos ISBN 978-960-06-2317-8 3rd edition ISBN 978-960-06-2356-7

The composer Hans Werner Henze set two of Katsaros' poems for his song-cycle Voices (1973).

=== Books ===
Michalis Katsaros was the inspiration for one of her nephew imaginary character on her book "A Letter From Greece".
