= Jan Willem Loot =

Dutch lawyer and cellist (1943–2021)

- Born: 15 December 1943; Breda
- Died: 6 February 2021 (aged 77); Amsterdam
- Occupation: Orchestra administrator

Jan Willem Loot (15 December 1943 – 6 February 2021) was a Dutch orchestra administrator.

== Biography ==
Loot was born in Breda and grew up in Arnhem. He was one of four children in his family, with music as a standard part of his upbringing. As a youth, he learned the cello, and also the piano. He read law at the University of Groningen. During his studies in Groningen, he was a member of the Groningen-based student orchestra Bragi.

Loot's first post with an orchestra was as deputy director of the Overijssels Philharmonsch Orkest. He became general director of the orchestra at age 28, within a year of his initial hire. During this tenure, he altered the earlier policy of a lifetime appointment for the orchestra's chief conductor, and prevented a merger of this ensemble with Het Gelders Orkest.

In 1979, Loot became general director of the Amsterdam Philharmonic Orchestra (Amsterdams Philharmonisch Orkest). During his tenure, government decisions led to the merger of the Amsterdam Philharmonic Orchestra with the Utrechts Symfonieorkest (Utrecht Symphony Orchestra) and the Netherlands Chamber Orchestra (Nederlands Kamerorkest), with consequent musician redundancies. Loot oversaw the process, begun in 1985, and the resulting formation of the final organisation, the Netherlands Philharmonic Orchestra (NedPhO) / Netherlands Chamber Orchestra (NKO), along with the intended process of establishing the Netherlands Philharmonic Orchestra as the permanent orchestra for Dutch National Opera. He served as director of the foundation that oversaw the NedPhO / NKO, and secured the Beurs van Berlage as a rehearsal and performance venue for the musicians.

Loot became managing director of the Royal Concertgebouw Orchestra in 1998. His tenure encompassed the granting of the title Eredirigent (honorary conductor) to Bernard Haitink, as a partial restoration of past ruptured relations between the orchestra and Haitink, the appointment of Mariss Jansons as chief conductor, and establishment of the orchestra's own label 'RCO Live'. He also oversaw a restructuring of the management model of the orchestra. He retired from the Royal Concertgebouw Orchestra in 2008, at age 65.

In 2009, Fritz Straatman published a book about Loot's career, De witte kuif op het frontbalkon (Jan Willem Loot: muziek en management) ['The white crest in the front balcony (Jan Willem Loot: music and management')]. From 2009 to 2012, Loot was artistic director of the Orchestre National de France.

Loot was married to the Dutch politician Winnie Sorgdrager. Their marriage produced two sons, Ernest and Daniel. Their marriage ended in divorce in 1977. Loot's ex-wife and his sons survive him.
