= Compases para preguntas ensimismadas =

Musical composition by Hans Werner Henze

Compases para preguntas ensimismadas is a musical composition for viola, strings, wind sextet and percussion by the German composer Hans Werner Henze.

It was written during 1969–70. The title is taken from lines in Spanish by the Chilean poet Gaston Salvatore, means literally metres for questions absorbed in self-contemplation. The viola part is the monologue-like centre of the work, in a way parallel to Alban Berg's Violin Concerto, which according to some reviewers it appears to directly reference.

It was commissioned by Paul Sacher for the Japanese viola player Hirofumi Fukai, who gave the premiere in Basel on 11 February 1971, and subsequently recorded it under the composer's direction.
