= Five Scenes from the Snow Country =

Five Scenes from the Snow Country is a composition by Hans Werner Henze for marimba solo. The work was written in 1978 for Japanese percussionist Michiko Takahashi. An ordinary performance of the piece lasts about 15 minutes.

Henze has said that continuous snowfall inspired the composition, adding "Twice during short pauses in the storm I went into the woods and noticed the effect of drifts and the collection of snow crystals that sparkled in the sun." In terms of dynamics, the piece is mostly very quiet, especially in the third scene, which shifts between pppp and pp.

== Structure ==
As indicated by its title, the composition has five movements:

First scene: Mysteriously, tempo of a funeral march

Second scene: Very fast

Third scene: Very slowly, extremely quiet, whispering

Fourth scene: Allegretto (with grace, no rush)

Fifth scene: Andante cantabile
