= Royal Winter Music =

Classical guitar music

Royal Winter Music is the name given to two solo works for classical guitar by the German composer Hans Werner Henze. Both works are inspired by characters from Shakespeare.

The first work (described as a sonata) was completed in 1976, and is in six movements. The first part, Richard of Gloucester gives the overall work its name (from Richard's opening monologue Now is the winter of our discontent). It was premiered by Julian Bream (at whose request Henze had written it) in Berlin on 20 September 1976.

The second sonata, written in 1979, continues the Shakespearean theme in three parts. It was premiered by Reinbert Evers in the Goethe-Institut, Brussels on 25 November 1980.

Both works are dedicated to Julian Bream. Henze has stated that Royal Winter Music as whole is complete with two sonatas.

== First Sonata on Shakespearean Characters ==
1. Gloucester
2. Romeo and Juliet
3. Ariel
4. Ophelia
5. Touchstone, Audrey and William
6. Oberon

== Second Sonata on Shakespearean Characters ==
1. Sir Andrew Aguecheek (Junker Bleichenwang)
2. Bottom's Dream
3. Mad Lady Macbeth

== Henze's descriptions of the first sonata ==
My idea of developing music from Richard of Gloucester's monologue 'Now is the winter of our discontent', and of generating more music from that material, was conceived during the 1960s. Ten years later it took a more concrete form, when Julian Bream suggested to me that I should write a substantial new guitar work for him. More time went by, and only having finished 'We Come to the River' could I begin to realise our plan. Then began a collaboration with the instrumentalist that went through various phases, from which I gained a more profound knowledge of the technicalities and of the sound-world of the guitar. I would even go so far as to say that this collaboration gave me a new concept of how to write for an instrument with a rich tradition. The guitar is a 'knowing' or 'knowledgeable' instrument, with many limitations but also many unexplored spaces and depths within these limits. It possesses a richness of sound capable of embracing everything one might find in a gigantic contemporary orchestra; but one has to start from silence in order to notice this: one has to pause, and completely exclude noise.

The dramatis personae of this piece enter through the sound of the guitar as if it were curtain. Through masks, voices and gestures, they speak to us of great passion, of tenderness, sadness and comedy: strange events in people's lives. Into this, the whispering voices of spirits are mingled. The epilogue is spoken by Oberon, pacified and reconciled, as though Nature had been subjected to Man.

== Henze's description of the second sonata ==
Five years after the first, I started writing a second sonata for the guitar I love. And not only in order to be able to keep the overall title of the cycle (which is hereby closed) with its clear connection to Richard III, but also because of my attachment to Shakespeare's characters, or at least some of them, whose musical portrait I also want to make the second, completely different sonata, I felt compelled to do. Aguecheek (Bleichenwang) is one of the favorite characters of my time as a student in Braunschweig. Maybe it wasn't just Shakespeare, but also the director and Aguecheek of a production in the local theater around 1943 that made me not miss a performance.

== Recordings ==
- Henze - Dowland – Spirit Of Shakespeare, performed by Stephan Stiens, col legno – WWE 2CD 20104, released 2000.
- Hans Werner Henze: Royal Winter Music II. Carillon, Récitatif, Masque. An Eine Äolsharfe - Sabine Oehring, Gitarre - boris blacher ensemble - Leitung: Friedrich Goldmann, NCA CD.
- Otto Tolonen: Royal Winter Music (Alba Records, 2015).
