= Miguel Ángel Barnet Lanza =

Cuban writer and ethnographer (born 1940)

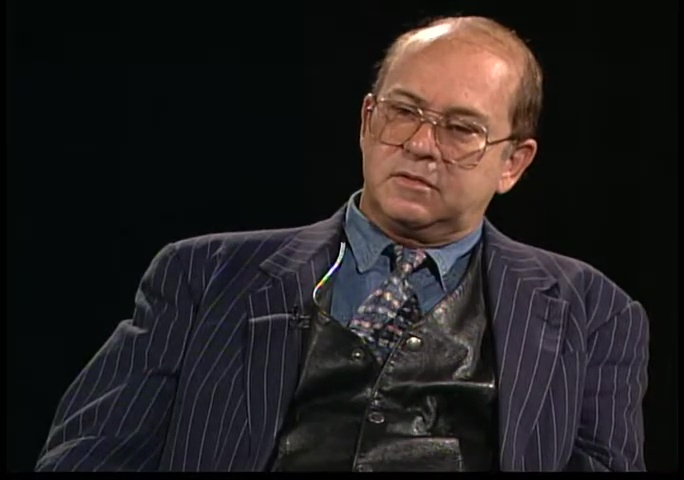
Barnet on CUNY TV's Charlando con Cervantes, 1995.

Miguel Ángel Barnet Lanza (born January 28, 1940) is a Cuban writer, novelist and ethnographer. Known as an expert on Afro-Cuban culture, he studied sociology at the University of Havana, under Fernando Ortiz, the pioneer of Cuban anthropology. Barnet is best known for his Biografia de un cimarrón (1966), the life of Esteban Montejo, a former slave who was 103 when they met. He had escaped and lived as a marron before slavery was abolished in Cuba.

Barnet's style of testimonial in this work became a standard for ethnography in Latin America. One of his later testimonial books, Gallego, was adapted as a 1988 film by the same name.

== Early life ==
Miguel Angel Barnet Lanza was born on January 28, 1940, in Havana, Cuba, to a prominent Cuban family of Catalan descent. Though he had his early education in the United States, when his family lived in Atlanta, Georgia, for a time, Barnet maintained a high degree of interest in and awareness of Cuban culture. In his early years he was a regular contributor of poetry and other writings to such Cuban publications as Lunes de Revolución and Hoy.

This literary background has informed Barnet's approach and works of anthropological writing.

In college, Barnet studied anthropology and sociology at the University of Havana. Against the backdrop of the Cuban Revolution, he developed a strong relationship with Cuban anthropologist Fernando Ortíz. The professor introduced Barnet to an ethnographic model centered on indigenous religion, creole language, and the oral tradition. In rural areas of the island, religious practices influenced by African and Taino traditions, such as santería, were practiced within the syncretic framework of Catholicism. Ortiz’s view of ethnographic research focusing primarily on indigenous culture was influenced by the Cuban communist political ideology of the time, rejecting European modes of learning. It emphasized study of the socially and economically marginalized class.

== Later career ==
Since 1995 Barnet has led the Fernando Ortiz Foundation in Havana, dedicated to the work of his professor and mentor. In 2009 Barnet was re-elected to a UNESCO committee on the study of Afro-Cuban culture. He had been a member of the executive committee of UNESCO for nine years.

== Biografía de un cimarrón ==
In 1963, Barnet was intrigued by two newspaper articles reporting on Cubans who were more than a century old. One article described an ex-slave who was a santeria. The other reported on Esteban Montejo, also a former slave, who was 103 years old. As a young man he had escaped from slavery to live as a maroon in the Las Villas wilderness (el monte). He later served as a soldier in the Cuban War for Independence in 1898.

When Barnet met him, Montejo was living at the Veterans’ Home. Barnet conducted numerous interviews with him, following anthropological methods of inquiry and analysis. For example, he used an electronic voice recorder to capture the nuances and tones of Montejo’s talks, so that he could more accurately convey it in writing. In 1966, Barnet published Montejo’s story as Biografía de un cimarrón (Biography of a Maroon). It was also translated into English and published that year in the United Kingdom and Australia as Autobiography of a Runaway Slave. It was later translated and published in the United States in English in 1994 as Biography of a Runaway Slave.

Barnet initiated what is now known as a testimonial narrative tradition with his Biografía de un cimarrón. Both as anthropological study or literature, it draws its authority from the perceived authenticity of the eyewitness account. The protagonist of Barnet’s work, Esteban Montejo, comes to represent not only the collective psychology of Cuba’s former slave class, but also the collective historical conscious of the entire Cuban population. Such authenticity is complicated by the translator's own inherent bias and motives—in this case Barnet—who is from another ethnicity and class. But Barnet was a staunch supporter of the Revolution, and his work satisfies political emphases in its focus on and recognition of the former slave class of Afro-Cubans.

In the prologue to the work, Barnet says that "nuestro trabajo no es histórico. La historia aparece porque es la vida de un hombre que pasa por ella" (our work here is not history. History appears in it because it is the life of a man who passes through history). Also, “sabemos que poner a hablar a un informante es, en cierta medida, hacer literatura. Pero no intentamos creer un documento literario” (we know that referring to testimonial is, to a certain degree, creating literature. But our intentions are not to create a literary account). Barnet’s work is widely considered a synthesis of history and literature, as it is informed by the imaginative approach he demonstrates in his poetry. Some commentators classify his books as novels. He has created a unique representation of Cuban history and culture.

== Representation in other media ==
The composer Hans Werner Henze wrote a piece, El Cimarrón, based on Barnet's book. Henze also set a poem by Barnet, "Patria," for his 1973 song-cycle Voices.

- Gallego was adapted as a 1988 Cuban-Spanish film of the same name, with a screenplay by Mario Camus and directed by Manuel Octavio Gómez.

== Books ==
- 1963, La piedra fina y el pavorreal (“The Gem and the Peacock”)- poetry collection
- 1964, Isla de güijes (“Island of Sprites”) - poetry collection
- 1966, Biografia de un cimarrón
- 1969 Canción de Rachel (Rachel’s Song), also a kind of testimonial, is based on printed sources rather than direct interviews. He created this account as a composite of individuals whom he researched. The subject is an elderly diva from a Havana burlesque show.
- 1981 Gallego (“Galician”). Barnet again combined elements of the lives of several people to create a first-person portrait of a young male Spanish immigrant from Galicia to Cuba in 1916.
- 1986, La vida real (“Real Life”). He used this technique again to re-create the lives of Cubans who immigrated to the United States as workers before the 1959 revolution.
- 1989, Oficio de Angel (“Angel’s Trade”), is an autobiographical novel.

Barnet also has continued to write poetry. In 1993 he published a collection as Con pies de gato ("With Cat’s Feet").

== Honors and awards ==
- In 1994, Barnet was awarded Cuba's Premio Nacional de Literatura (National Prize for Literature), the most important award of its type in Cuba.
- In 2006, he received the Premio Internacional de Cuento Juan Rulfo (Juan Rulfo International Short Story Prize) for his short story "Fátima o el Parque de la Fraternidad."
- In 2012, World Literature Today published the English translation of his short story, titled "Fátima, Queen of the Night," and subsequently nominated it for the Pushcart Prize.

== Works ==
=== Novels ===
- Canción de Rachel (1969)
- Gallego (1983)
- La vida real (1986)
- Oficio de ángel (1989)

=== Poetry ===
- La piedrafina y el pavorreal (1963)
- Isla de güijes (1964)
- La sagrada familia (1967)
- Orikis y otros poemas (1980)
- Carta de noche (1982)
- Viendo mi vida pasar (anthology, 1987)
- Mapa del tiempo (1989)
- Poemas chinos (1993)
- Con pies de gato (anthology, 1993)
- Actas del final (2000)
- Gioco Comune, Trieste, FrancoPuzzoEditore, Premio Internazionale Trieste Poesia, 2005

=== Essays and ethnographies ===
- Biografía de un cimarrón (1966)
- Akeké y la Jutía. Fábulas cubanas
- Cultos Afrocubanos. La Regla de Ocha. La Regla de Palo Monte (1995)
- La fuente viva (1998)
