= Der langwierige Weg in die Wohnung der Natascha Ungeheuer =

Opera by Hans Werner Henze

- Opera by Hans Werner Henze
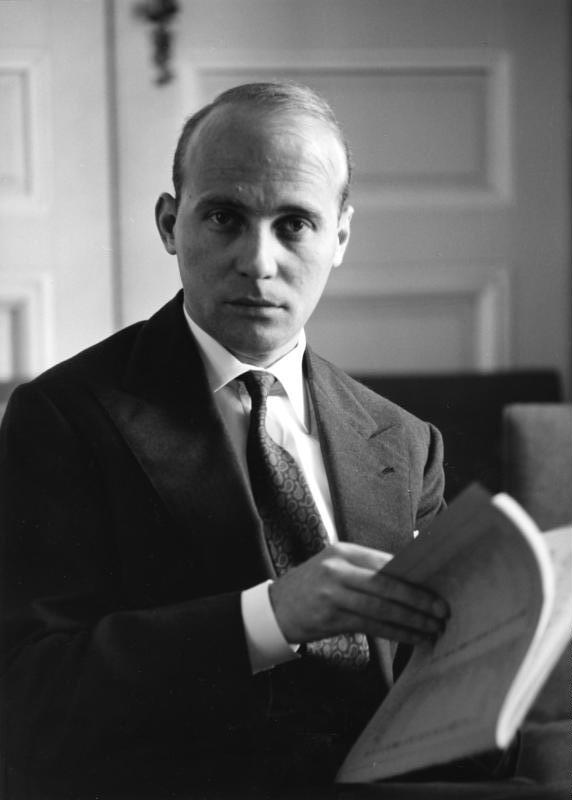
- The composer in 1960
- Librettist: Gaston Salvatore
- Language: German
- Premiere: May 17, 1971; Teatro Olimpico, Rome, and RAI radio broadcast

Der langwierige Weg in die Wohnung der Natascha Ungeheuer (The Tedious Way to the Place of Natascha Ungeheuer) is a composition by the German composer Hans Werner Henze. It represents one of the most outré examples of his early socialism-inspired works.

== Overview ==
Described as a "show for 17", it is a setting of a libretto based on the poetry collection by the Chilean poet Gaston Salvatore, who had been prominent in the West German student movement of 1968 in Berlin. It features a baritone soloist, whose demanding role includes sprechstimme, screeches and spoken passages. He is accompanied by an organist, jazz band and a chamber ensemble akin to that used in Schoenberg's Pierrot lunaire. Additionally, a large battery of percussion is used as well as voices and music on tape, representing street noises of Berlin, and brief extracts from Verdi's Aida and Mahler's Fifth Symphony.

The work is an allegory: Natascha Ungeheuer (in English 'monster', 'ogre', but also a reference to the German painter Natascha Ungeheuer) is the "siren of a false Utopia" according to Salvatore. She lures the leftist intellectual into the cosy situation whereby they preach socialist values whilst essentially living the same bourgeois middle class lifestyle, identifying with the proletariat in words only. In a broadly analogous way to the temptation of Christ, Salvatore's hero resists the temptation to go all the way to Natascha's apartment, yet "has not yet discovered his way to the revolution".

The work was premièred and broadcast by RAI Radio at the Teatro Olimpico, Rome, on 17 May September 1971 with William Pearson as the soloist and the Gunter Hampel Free Jazz Ensemble, the Philip Jones Brass Ensemble and the Fires of London along with the percussionist Stomu Yamash'ta under Henze's direction. Recorded voices on tape were those of Dieter Schidor, Elfriede Irral, Gaston Salvatore and Henze. The first performance in Germany was at the Deutsche Oper Berlin later that year.

It was met with boos from the audience, which, Henze reflected, "was understandable [in] that our portrait of Berlin caused displeasure" amongst the very intellectuals it savaged.

The work was recorded soon after for Deutsche Grammophon with the same forces.

== Instrumentation ==
1 Flute (doubling on Piccolo)

1 Clarinet (doubling on E-Flat and 2nd Bass Clarinet)

1 Bass Clarinet (doubling on flute and ocarina (amplification needed for Ocarina), Vibraphone, and other percussion (jazz ensemble))

1 Saxophone

1 French Horn

2 Trumpets

2 Trombones (jazz ensemble)

Timpani (jazz ensemble)

Flexiphone (jazz ensemble)

Piano

Organ (jazz ensemble)

Violin (sometimes with microphone for amplification, doubling on Viola)

Cello (sometimes with microphone for amplification)

Double Bass (jazz ensemble)

Baritone soloist

== Structure ==
The work consists of the following segments and lasts about one hour:

1. Planimetrie (Planimetry)
2. Belästigungsversuche (Attempts at Molestation)
3. Die verschleierten Boten (The Veiled Messengers)
4. Der lustlose Aufpasser (The Listless Spy)
5. Einleitung zu Die schwierige Bourgeoisie (Introduction to The Difficult Bourgeoisie)
6. Die schwierige Bourgeoisie: Erster Rückkehrversuch (The Difficult Bourgeoisie: First Attempted Return)
7. Zweiter Rückkehrversuch (Second Attempted Return)
8. Dritter Rückkehrversuch – Deutsches Lied (Third Attempted Return – German Song)
9. Vermessungskunde (Geodesy)
10. Sprachübung (Galgenlied) (Speech Practice – Gallows' Song)
11. Metapenthes [transcending grief]
