= El Cimarrón (Henze) =

- "recital" by Hans Werner Henze
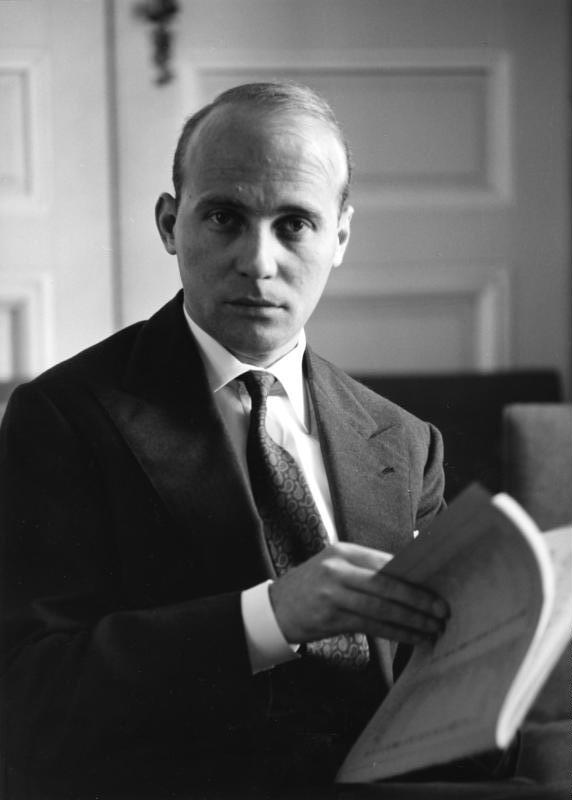
- The composer in 1960
- Text: by Hans Magnus Enzensberger
- Language: German
- Based on: oral autobiography of Esteban Montejo to Miguel Barnet
- Performed: 1970: Berlin
- Scoring: baritone; guitar; flute; percussion

El cimarrón (The Runaway Slave) is a 75-minute "recital" for baritone, flute, guitar and percussion by the German composer Hans Werner Henze, written when he lived in Cuba in 1969–1970. The descriptive term in quotation marks is the composer's own. The baritone narrates, taking the listener through fifteen brief scenes delivered mostly half-sung. Subtitled Biographie des geflohenen Sklaven Esteban Montejo, or Biography of the Runaway Slave Esteban Montejo, and with a libretto by Hans Magnus Enzensberger, El cimarrón is based on an oral auto-biography given in 1963 to Miguel Barnet. Besides having endured slavery, Montejo also fought in the Cuban War of Independence (1895–98).

== History ==
In Cuba in the 19th century, Cimarrón was a term for a runaway slave. The former slave on which Henze's El Cimarrón is based was Esteban Montejo, born in 1860; he told his story in an interview, at age 104, with the Cuban ethnologist Miguel Barnet, who made it a documentary El Cimarrón for ethnographic, social and psychological studies.

Hans Magnus Enzensberger, who at the time lived in Cuba, took care of inviting Henze to Cuba; the first visit was from 21 March 1969 to 16 April. Henze met Barnet, who arranged meetings with Cuban artists and introduced him to the Yoruba religion. Henze also met Montejo, and noted afterwards: "I had never seen a man that old. He was as tall as a tree, walked slowly and very erect; his eyes were alive; he radiated dignity; he seemed to be sure he was a historical personality." On his second visit, Barnet gave him the German edition of his documentary . Enzensberger prepared a libretto for Henze, based on the documentary. Henze sketched its first movement on 18 December that year. He completed the work in February 1970 at his home in Marino, Italy. He began rehearsing with Leo Brouwer, a Cuban guitarist, flutist Karlheinz Zöller, Japanese percussionist Stomu Yamashta and American singer William Pearson.

The work received its premiere at the 1970 Berlin Festival, with the composer conducting. The UK premiere was in June 1970 at the Aldeburgh Festival with the same forces, followed by a tour to festivals in Spoleto, Munich, Edinburgh, Berlin and Avignon. The Australian premiere was performed at the Adelaide Festival on 14 March 1976, conducted by the composer, with Lyndon Terracini as El Cimarrón, Geoffrey Collins (flute), Roger Glanville-Hicks (guitar), and Colin Piper (percussion).

== Tableaux ==
The work is divided into fifteen tableaux which are essentially songs. Some scenes reflect on historical events, others on personal views of the former slave:

1. Die Welt (The World)
2. Der Cimarrón
3. Die Sklaverei (Slavery)
4. Die Flucht (Flight)
5. Der Wald (Forest)
6. Die Geister (Spirits)
7. Die falsche Freiheit (False Freedom)
8. Die Frauen (Women)
9. Die Maschinen (Machines)
10. Die Pfarrer (Clergy)
11. Der Aufstand (Uprising)
12. Die Schlacht von Mal Tiempo (Battle of Mal Tiempo)
13. Der schlechte Sieg (Evil Victory)
14. Die Freundlichkeit (Friendliness)
15. Das Messer (Knife)

Henze described the score as a "recital for four musicians". They consist of a baritone who portrays El Cimarrón, a guitarist, a flautist and a percussionist, although all four musicians play percussion instruments during the work. The flautist also plays the Japanese ryūteki and the Italian scacciapensieri (Jew's harp), as well as the four conventional orchestral flutes. He made extensive vocal demands on the singer, including laughter, whistling, shouting, screaming and falsetto.

Henze's score features aleatoric elements, "fields" in which pitches and sounds are specified, but leaving tempo and dynamics to be determined by the performers, passages for improvisation, as well as sections in the classical manner. The traditional instruments are supplemented by Caribbean and African instruments, such as Trinidad steel drum, marimbula, log drums, octobans, temple bells, congas and bongos. Some instruments highlight the drama, such as an iron chain in No. 3.
