= Royal Concertgebouw Orchestra =

Symphony orchestra of Amsterdam, the Netherlands

- Orchestra
- Founded: 1888
- Location: Amsterdam, Netherlands
- Concert hall: Royal Concertgebouw
- Principal conductor: Klaus Mäkelä (designate, effective 2027)
- Website: Official website

The Royal Concertgebouw Orchestra (Dutch: Koninklĳk Concertgebouworkest, pronounced [ˌkoːnɪŋklə kɔnˈsɛrtxəbʌu.ɔrˌkɛst]) is a Dutch symphony orchestra, established in 1888 at the Amsterdam Royal Concertgebouw (concert hall). It is considered one of the world's leading orchestras. It was known as the Concertgebouw Orchestra until Queen Beatrix conferred the "Royal" prefix upon it in celebration of its centenary in 1988; the prefix was also granted to the concert hall in 2013.

== History ==
The Concertgebouw opened on 11 April 1888. The Concertgebouw Orchestra was established several months later and gave its first concert in the Concertgebouw on 3 November 1888. This performance was conducted by the orchestra's first chief conductor, Willem Kes.

=== 1888–1945: Kes and Mengelberg ===
Willem Kes served as the orchestra's chief conductor from its 1888 founding to 1895. In 1895, Willem Mengelberg became chief conductor and remained in this position for fifty years, an unusually long tenure for a music director. He is generally regarded as having brought the orchestra to a level of major international significance, with a particular championing of such then-contemporary composers as Gustav Mahler and Richard Strauss.

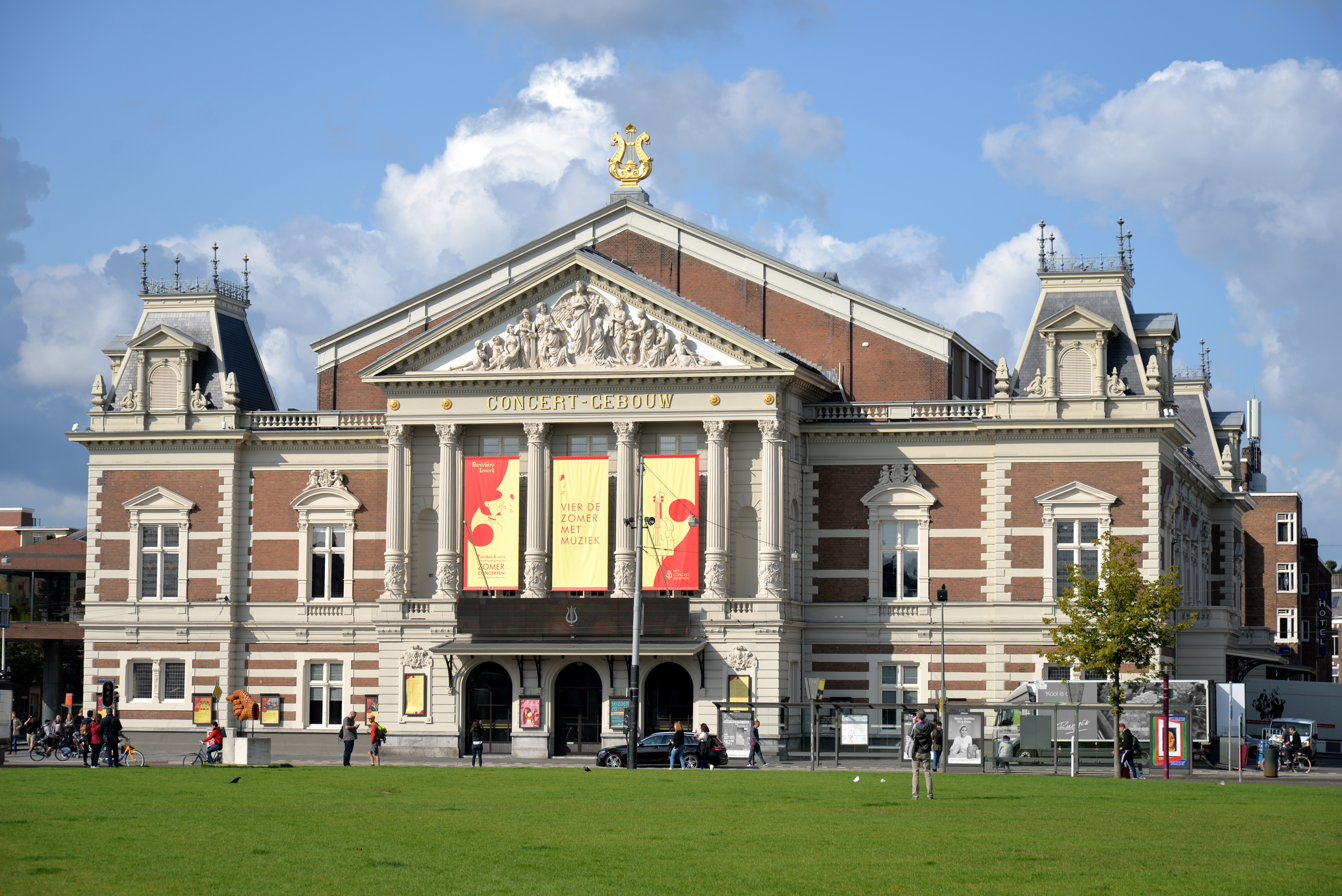
The Concertgebouw

For approximately its first 75 years, the Concertgebouw Orchestra had a complex roster of conductors. In addition to the chief conductor, the orchestra had conductor positions titled "eerste dirigent" ("first conductor"), who assisted the chief conductor with programming, and "tweede dirigent" ("second conductor"), who did "what he was told." During Mengelberg's time as chief conductor, several of these first conductors included Karl Muck (1921–1925), Pierre Monteux (1924–1934), Bruno Walter (1934–1939), and Eugen Jochum (1941–1943), each of them internationally respected and holding positions at other orchestras as well. Musicians who served as "second conductor" were all Dutch and included the composer Cornelis Dopper, Evert Cornelis and Eduard van Beinum.

In 1945, because of the controversy over his relationship with the Nazi occupying forces during the German occupation of the Netherlands during World War II, Mengelberg was removed as chief conductor and subsequently banned from conducting in The Netherlands. The ban was initially imposed for the remainder of his life, but after an appeal, reduced to six years, applied retroactively from 1945. Mengelberg died in 1951 just before the end of his sentence, and thus never conducted the orchestra again after 1945.

=== 1945–1988: Van Beinum and Haitink ===
From 1945 to 1959, the orchestra's principal conductor was Eduard van Beinum, who had debuted with the orchestra in 1929. He had become the second conductor of the orchestra in 1931, and co-principal conductor in 1938. One of his specialties was the symphonies of Anton Bruckner, and Van Beinum made commercial recordings with the orchestra of Bruckner's Eighth and Ninth Symphonies for the Philips Records label. Van Beinum served as sole chief conductor of the orchestra after World War II until his sudden death on the Concertgebouw podium from a heart attack in April 1959.

Bernard Haitink made his debut with the Concertgebouw Orchestra on 7 November 1956. After Van Beinum's death, from 1961 to 1963, Haitink and Eugen Jochum shared the post of chief conductor of the orchestra. Haitink became sole chief conductor in 1963, and served in this post until 1988. During Haitink's tenure, the conductor roster system was simplified to have an assistant conductor instead of first and second conductors. Conductors who served in this capacity included Edo de Waart and Hans Vonk. The recording profile of the orchestra increased most dramatically under Haitink, with many recordings for Philips Records, as well as EMI and Columbia Records.

In the early 1980s, the Dutch government threatened the orchestra with reductions in its government subsidy that could potentially have led to the dismissal of 23 musicians from the orchestra. Haitink threatened to resign in protest, and the financial situation was eventually settled. In addition, tensions had developed in the later years of Haitink's tenure between the orchestra management and Haitink, in particular between Haitink and then-artistic director Hein van Royen. In 1999, Haitink was named the orchestra's conductor laureate (eredirigent), following a rapprochement negotiated by the then-new managing director of the orchestra, Jan Willem Loot. In March 2014, Haitink suggested to the Dutch newspaper Het Parool that he wished to renounce the title of RCO conductor laureate and no longer to guest-conduct the orchestra, in protest at the orchestra's current administrative management. In September 2015, the orchestra announced a rapprochement with Haitink, with a scheduled guest-conducting engagement with the KCO (Koninklijk Concertgebouworkest) in the 2016–2017 season. Haitink retained the title of eredirigent with the orchestra through his 2019 retirement and until his death in October 2021.

=== 1988–2018: Chailly, Jansons and Gatti ===
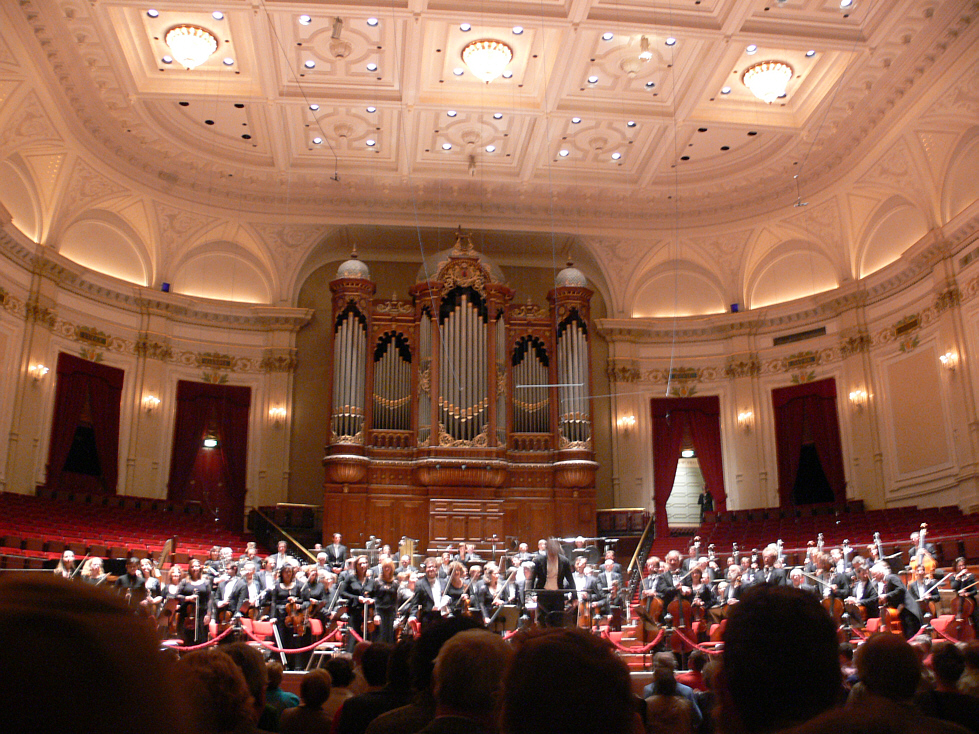
The orchestra performing in the Grote Zaal (Great Hall)

Riccardo Chailly made his debut with the Concertgebouw Orchestra in 1985, and was elected that year as their next chief conductor to succeed Haitink. As the first non-Dutchman to hold the post, Chailly served as chief conductor from 1988 to 2004. His recordings with the orchestra include complete Mahler and Brahms symphony cycles and several Bruckner symphonies. With a conducting style described, in contrast to Haitink, as that of "a control freak and precision fanatic", Chailly was a strong advocate of modern music and recorded shorter works of Shostakovich, the complete Kammermusiken of Paul Hindemith, and the orchestral works of Igor Stravinsky, Olivier Messiaen and Edgard Varese. After his departure in 2004, Chailly was named Conductor Emeritus of the KCO.

Mariss Jansons made his KCO debut in 1988. On 22 October 2002, the KCO elected Jansons as its next chief conductor. His tenure officially began on 1 September 2004, with an initial contract of three years. Premières during Janson's tenure have included Hans Werner Henze's Sebastian im Traum, a RCO co-commission. In April 2014, the orchestra announced the scheduled conclusion of Jansons' tenure as chief conductor after the 2014–15 season. Jansons subsequently held the title of conductor emeritus of the RCO until his death in 2019.

Daniele Gatti first guest-conducted the KCO in 2004. In October 2014, the KCO announced the appointment of Gatti as its seventh chief conductor, effective in 2016. On 2 August 2018, the orchestra dismissed Gatti as chief conductor with immediate effect, following complaints of "inappropriate" behaviour with female musicians.

=== 2020–present ===
In October 2020, the KCO announced the appointment of Iván Fischer as its honorary guest conductor (honorair gastdirigent), effective with the 2021–2022 season.

In September 2020, Klaus Mäkelä first guest-conducted the KCO. The KCO re-engaged Mäkelä twice in the 2020–2021 season, and subsequently in the 2021–2022 season for further guest-conducting appearances, including tours to Hamburg and Reykjavík. In June 2022, the RCO announced the appointment of Mäkelä as an artistic partner for the period of 2022–2027, and subsequently as its next chief conductor, effective with the 2027–2028 season, with an initial contract of 5 years.

In March 2024, the KCO announced the establishment of the Bernard Haitink Associate Conductorship, through a donation from Patricia Haitink and the Haitink family, and the appointment of Aurel Dawidiuk as the orchestra's inaugural associate conductor under this programme.

== Character ==
The orchestra enjoyed a close relationship with Gustav Mahler and championed many of his symphonies, with an especially worthy festival of his music being the 1920 Mahler Festival. Other conductors who worked closely with the Concertgebouw Orchestra included Pierre Monteux, Eugen Jochum, George Szell and Kirill Kondrashin, who was principal guest conductor from 1978, following his defection from the USSR, until his death in 1981. More recently, Nikolaus Harnoncourt served as Honorary Guest Conductor of the RCO, beginning in 2000, and leading his final performance with the RCO in October 2013.

Another factor in creating the orchestra's distinct character is that the Concertgebouw Orchestra has had only seven chief conductors, setting it apart from orchestras of similar age and caliber. The nearly one thousand recordings that the orchestra has to its credit have also contributed to this reputation. The orchestra also serves as one of the opera orchestras for productions of the Dutch National Opera.

Jan Raes served as executive director of the orchestra from December 2008 to December 2019. Prior executive directors included Jan Willem Loot. In January 2020, the orchestra announced David Bazen as its interim managing director, with immediate effect. In August 2020, the orchestra announced the appointment of a new three-person managing board, naming Dominik Winterling as Chairman.

Past artistic directors of the Concertgebouw Orchestra have included Rudolf Mengelberg (1925–1955), Marius Flothuis (1955–1974), Hein van Royen (1974–1991) and Peter Ruzicka, and more recently as head of artistic administration, Joel Ethan Fried. In August 2020, the orchestra announced the appointment of Ulrike Niehoff as its artistic director, effective 1 January 2021. Niehoff stood down from the post at the close of the 2022–2023 season. In November 2024, the KCO announced the appointment of Elena Dubinets as its next artistic director, effective 1 May 2025.

The KCO has issued CDs on its own label, RCO Live, as conducted by Jansons and Haitink among others.

== Chief conductors ==
- Willem Kes (1888–1895)
- Willem Mengelberg (1895–1945)
- Eduard van Beinum (1945–1959)
- Eugen Jochum (1961–1963; co-chief conductor with Bernard Haitink)
- Bernard Haitink (1961–1988)
- Riccardo Chailly (1988–2004)
- Mariss Jansons (2004–2015)
- Daniele Gatti (2016–2018)
- Klaus Mäkelä (designate, effective 2027)

== Notes ==
Klaus Mäkelä, though not officially starting until 2027, gave highly praised performances at the Royal Concertgebouw which led to his appointment as chief conductor in 2022, as reported by the Financial Times reviewing his leadership at the BBC Proms.Financial Times (25 August 2025). "Klaus Mäkelä leads Royal Concertgebouw in best orchestral playing of the BBC Proms so far".
