= Sebastian im Traum =

Sebastian im Traum (The Dream of Sebastian) is an orchestral composition by the German composer Hans Werner Henze.

Based on the poem of the same name by Georg Trakl, it is a fifteen-minute composition for large orchestra. Composed in 2004, it was a joint commission by the Eduard van Beinum Foundation, the New York Philharmonic, the Zurich Tonhalle and the Royal Concertgebouw Orchestra.

According to Henze:

The music tried to follow the traces of the poet's words (as someone with a movie camera tries to capture the course of events or as another perhaps takes down the communication of subject matter in shorthand) and it has a deep relationship to Salzburg - to the ... temperatures and perfumes, to the rustic Baroque, to the biblical, to the wooden crucifix, to the nearness of death, to the moonlight, to Traklish evening sonatas... we continually hear different characters, new ones always come and go, appear, shine, and disappear.

It was premiered on 22 December 2005 at the Concertgebouw, with Mariss Jansons conducting. The same forces later recorded it as part of a two-disc set featuring Mahler's Sixth Symphony on the orchestra's own label.
