= Symphony No. 1 (Henze) =

1947 symphony by Hans Werner Henze

Hans Werner Henze's Symphony No. 1 was premiered in Darmstadt in 1947. The premiere was hit by Henze's accustomed bad luck. The orchestral parts, handwritten by the composer himself, had become illegible during photocopying in Schott’s offices and despite the young composer’s best efforts to ink in the parts throughout the night, only the slow movement was performed. The whole symphony was eventually premiered a year later, although Henze himself conducted the work only after comprehensive revision.

The revision of the First Symphony was part of Henze’s first great purge on his early work during 1963. The revised sheet music contains a number of rhythmic, harmonic and melodic cells from the original version, and the slow movement is largely unaltered. Otherwise everything is, in the composer’s own words, ‘different and better.’ A fourth, theme and variation movement has completely disappeared, and the work was re-scored for chamber orchestra. Further revision followed in 1991.

The first movement is in a contorted sonata form, in which the few melodic and rhythmic cells upon which the work is built gradually swell up to an unnerving climax high in the orchestra’s range, followed by a brief recapitulation. The only music to survive Henze's revision, the second movement reveals the heavy influence of Hindemith on the composer, especially given the lyrical viola solo. The final movement develops the same material, now with an aggressive rhythm, the texture building to a true climax before fading around eerily repeating harp harmonics.

In 2005, a fourth version of the work was prepared, for fifteen players, as Kammerkonzert 05, an eightieth-birthday commission from the Bavarian State Opera. This version had its world premiere at Munich on July 6, 2006, and now has titles for the three movements:

1. Allegretto con grazia
2. Notturno
3. Allegro con moto

Henze himself recorded the work (in the 1963 revision) for Deutsche Grammophon as part of a survey of his five early symphonies. These were subsequently released on CD along with a later recording of his Sixth Symphony. The revised 1991 version has been recorded by the Berlin Radio Symphony Orchestra under Marek Janowski.
