= Esteban Montejo =

Afro-Cuban former slave and resistance fighter (1868-1973)

- Born: c. 1868; Las Villas, Captaincy General of Cuba, Spanish Empire
- Died: February 10, 1973 (aged 104)
- Occupations: Slave; sugar plantation worker; rebel soldier
- Parent(s): Emilia Montejo and Nazario

Esteban Mesa Montejo (c. 1868 – February 10, 1973) was a Cuban enslaved person who escaped to freedom before slavery was abolished on the island in 1886. He lived as a maroon (runaway slaved) in the mountains until that time. He also served in the war of independence in Cuba. He is known for having his biography published in 1966, in both Spanish and English, several years before his death and when he was already at least in his 90s. He seems to have lived to be about 104. In 1997 Michael Zeuske, a German historian and field researcher of Cuban slavery and life histories, found evidence of Esteban Montejo's real date of birth in the baptismal registers (in Sagua la Grande) - not 1860, but 1868 (December 26)

After being featured in a newspaper article, Montejo had been contacted in 1963 by Cuban ethnologist Miguel Barnet, who conducted a series of taped interviews with him. From these, he published a book about Montejo's life. The book in Spanish was published as a biography of Montejo by Barnet, and in English as an autobiography by Montejo.

== Biography ==
Around 1868, Esteban Mesa Montejo was born into slavery on a sugar-cane plantation in Cuba. He grew up with the Afro-Cuban religion Santería, which combined Roman Catholicism and elements of Yoruba religion.

As a young man he was determined to be free and escaped from the plantation. He fled to the mountains, where there were communities of other maroons, refugees who lived beyond the reach of planters. Cuba did not abolish slavery until 1886, when Montejo was either around 18 or 26 years old.

After that, he worked mostly on farms and plantations, which made up most of the Cuban economy. During the war of independence in 1898, he fought for an independent Cuba. In his last years, he lived in a veterans' home.

== 1962–1963 to 1970 ==
In 1962 Montejo was one of two people featured in a newspaper article about Cubans who were more than a century old. Both were former enslaved people. He was contacted by ethnologist Miguel Barnet, who wanted to interview him about his life.

Barnet edited the transcripts and published an account of Montejo's life in 1966, as Biografía de un cimarrón. Montejo and Barnet's book includes descriptions of Afro-Cuban religious expression and of Montejo's life as a fugitive slave. He also recounted his memories of the Cuban war for independence from Spain in 1898, which he fought in. The United States intervened and its military forces occupied Cuba for several years. Barnet ends the book in 1905, following the US occupation of Cuba from 1898 to 1902.

An English translation was published in 1966 in the United Kingdom and Australia as The Autobiography of a Runaway Slave. Years later, it was published in English in the United States, as Biography of a Runaway Slave.

== See also ==
- Miguel Barnet

== External links (Montejo's book) ==
- Montejo, Esteban; Barnet, Miguel (1993). The autobiography of a runaway slave. Introduction by Miguel Barnet; introduction and bibliographical essay by Alistair Hennessy. London: Macmillan Caribbean. ISBN 0333535073.
- Barnet, Miguel (1984). Biografía de un cimarrón. Madrid: Alfaguara. ISBN 842042143X.
