= Eduard van Beinum =

Dutch conductor (1900–1959)

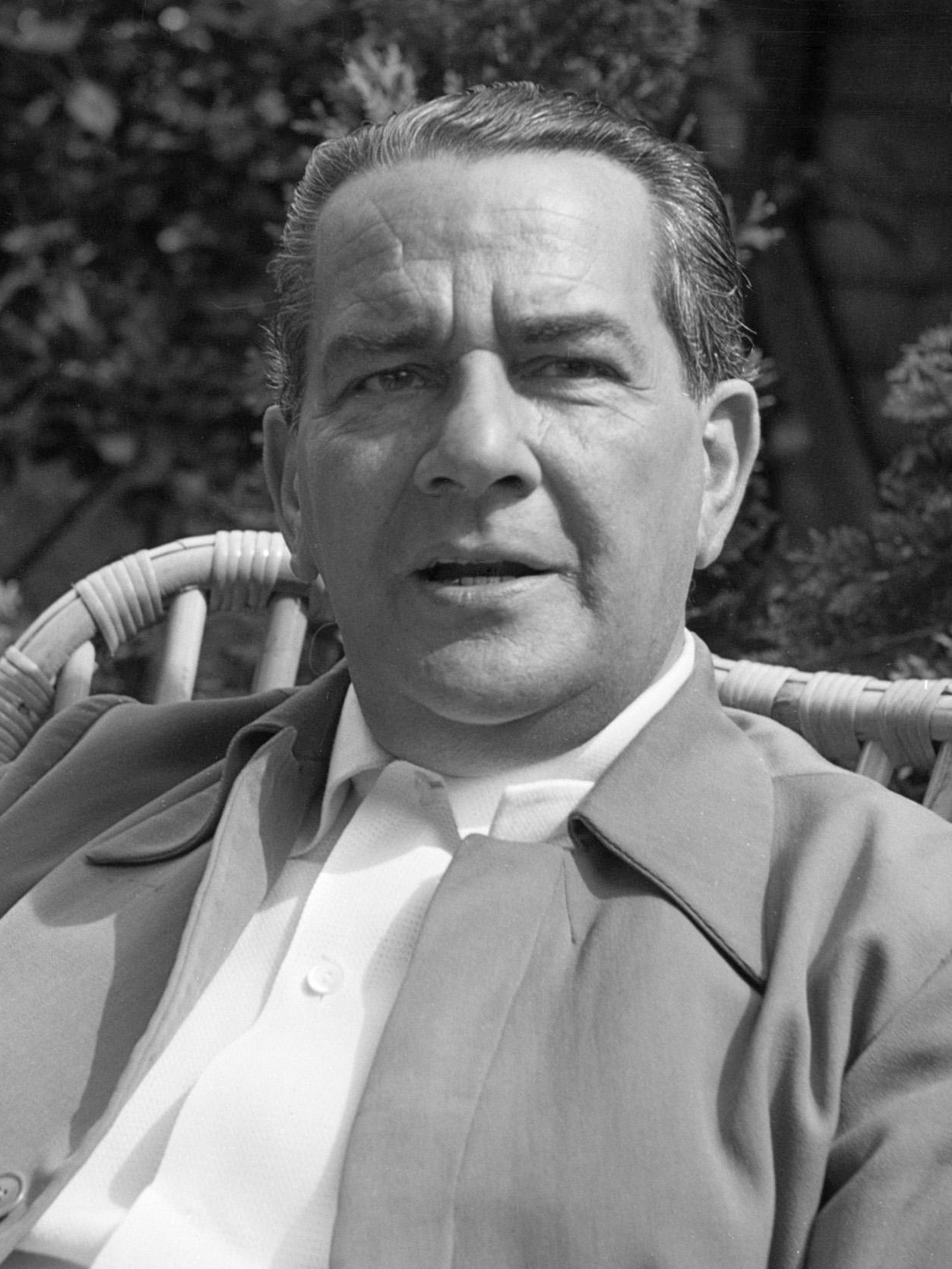

Background information
- Born: 3 September 1900; Arnhem, Netherlands
- Died: 13 April 1959 (aged 58) Amsterdam, Netherlands
- Genres: Classical
- Occupations: Conductor, pedagogue
- Instruments: Piano, violin
- Years active: 1918–1959
- Formerly of: Concertgebouw Orchestra; London Philharmonic; Los Angeles Philharmonic

Eduard Alexander van Beinum (Dutch pronunciation: [ˈeːdyʋɑrt fɑm ˈbɛinəm]; 3 September 1900 – 13 April 1959) was a Dutch conductor.

== Biography ==
Van Beinum was born in Arnhem, Netherlands, where he received his first violin and piano lessons at an early age. He joined the Arnhem Orchestra as a violinist in 1918. His grandfather was conductor of a military band. His father played the double bass in the local symphony orchestra, the Arnhemse Orkest (later Het Gelders Orkest). His brother Co van Beinum was a violinist, and the two brothers performed as a violin-piano duo in concerts.

As a student at the Amsterdam Conservatoire, van Beinum gained conducting experience with several concerts by amateur ensembles in Schiedam and Zutphen. He also conducted concerts by the choir of the church of St. Nicholas in Amsterdam. He took his first conducting post with the Zutphensche Orkest Vereeniging and Toonkunstkoor in Zutphen in 1925. From 1927 to 1931, van Beinum was the conductor of the Haarlem Orchestral Society.

=== Professional career ===
In 1929, van Beinum first guest-conducted the Concertgebouw Orchestra. He became second conductor of the orchestra in 1931, under the supervision of Willem Mengelberg. In 1938, the orchestra named him co-principal conductor, alongside Mengelberg.

During World War II, according to Kees Wisse, van Beinum "detested the Nazis and kept himself as aloof as he could." Van Beinum refused to conduct a 1943 benefit concert for the Nazis, and threatened to resign as co-principal conductor if forced to conduct that event. After World War II, Mengelberg was dismissed as principal conductor because of controversy over his (still-disputed) behavior and attitude towards the Nazi occupiers in the Netherlands. Van Beinum did receive a reprimand after the post-war de-Nazification activities, but this was not so severe as to keep him from his post with the Concertgebouw. Van Beinum remained as sole principal conductor of the Concertgebouw Orchestra after the war. His recordings with the Concertgebouw Orchestra remain available on the Philips and Decca labels.

In 1947, van Beinum became principal conductor of the London Philharmonic Orchestra (LPO), but left after two successful seasons. According to Michael Kennedy in his biography of Sir Adrian Boult, van Beinum "was not well", which led the LPO to seek Boult as a successor to him. In general, van Beinum suffered from health problems, including a heart condition, which left him unable to conduct for much of the 1950–1951 season of the Concertgebouw Orchestra.

In 1954, van Beinum made his US guest-conducting debut with the Philadelphia Orchestra. He took the Concertgebouw Orchestra on its first U.S. tour later in 1954. In 1956, the year of van Beinum's 25th anniversary with the Concertgebouw Orchestra, he was invested as a Grand Officer of the Order of Orange Nassau, and also received an honorary doctorate from the University of Amsterdam. Outside of the Netherlands, he also served as music director of the Los Angeles Philharmonic from 1956 to 1959.

On 13 April 1959, van Beinum suffered a fatal heart attack on the Concertgebouw podium while rehearsing the orchestra for a performance of Johannes Brahms' Symphony No. 1. He was buried in Garderen, in the Veluwe region, where he maintained a residence. After his death, the Eduard van Beinum Foundation was established in 1960. The Openbare Basisschool Eduard Van Beinum in Rotterdam is named in his honour.

Van Beinum was married to Sepha Jansen, a violinist with the Concertgebouw Orchestra. The couple had two sons, Eduard and Bartholemeus ('Bart'), both of them musicians. In 2000, Bart van Beinum published a book about his father, Eduard van Beinum, over zijn leven en werk. In 2004, Truus de Leur published her biography of van Beinum, Eduard van Beinum, 1900-1959 – Musicus tussen musici ('Eduard van Beinum, 1900-1959 – Musician among musicians'). In the course of her research, de Leur commented on her research to look for negative as well as positive aspects about van Beinum's personality:

"Ik heb echt gezocht, ook al omdat mijn redacteuren mij waarschuwden dat het geen hagiografie mocht worden. Maar ik heb niets kunnen vinden. Over van Beinum kom je alleen maar positieve dingen tegen."
("I really searched, also because my editors warned me that it should not be a hagiography. But I couldn't find anything. You only come across positive things about van Beinum.")
