= Symphony No. 4 (Henze) =

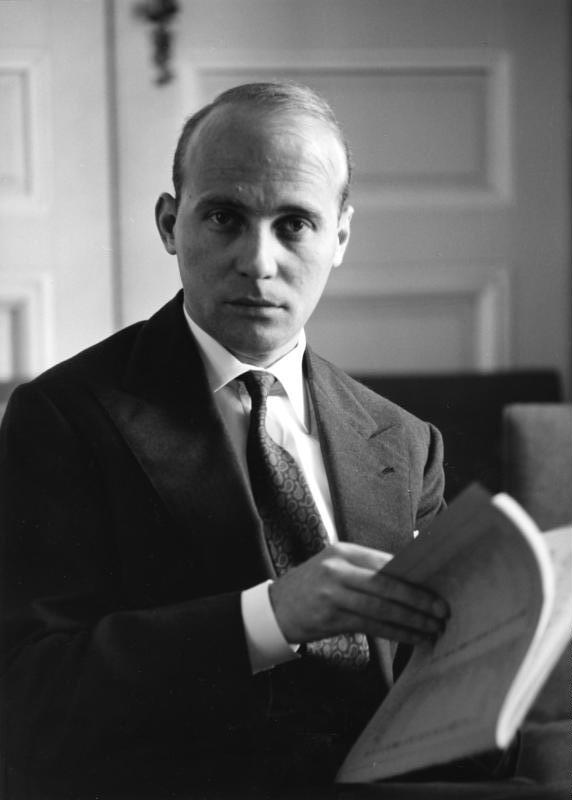
Hans Werner Henze in 1960

Hans Werner Henze's Symphony No. 4 was written in 1955. It was premiered at the Hochschule für Musik, Berlin on 9 October 1963 by the Berlin Philharmonic Orchestra conducted by the composer.

== Background ==
The fourth symphony was originally the finale to act two of Henze's opera König Hirsch (King Stag).

The opera was due to be given its first performance on 23 September 1956 in Berlin. Rehearsals went badly. The conductor Hermann Scherchen insisted on substantial cuts to the score and, as a result, only half of the music was heard at the first performance. Henze rescued one of the cuts - the music from the finale to the second act - and derived his fourth symphony from it. In its original operatic context the music was to accompany a scene in which the king, magically transformed into a white stag, has fled into the forest and spends a year there contemplating his future before realising that he must return to the human world.

Henze wrote the symphony whilst he was teaching at the Darmstadt Summer School for New Music. Some of his composer colleagues reacted badly to the harmoniousness of Henze's composition.

== Structure and style ==
The symphony is scored for piccolo, 2 flutes, 2 oboes, cor anglais, 2 clarinets, bass clarinet, 2 bassoons, contrabassoon, 4 horns, 3 trumpets, 2 trombones, tuba, percussion (3 players), harp, celesta, piano and strings.

It is in a single movement, lasting some 20 minutes.

The one movement contains all of the normal elements of the usual symphonic form. It commences with a short, slow introduction followed by a sonata form section, an adagio, a scherzo and a rondo-like finale.

== Recordings ==
- Deutsche Grammophon/Brilliant Classics - Berlin Philharmonic conducted by the composer
- Wergo - Berlin Radio Symphony Orchestra conducted by Marek Janowski
