= Symphony No. 9 (Henze) =

Choral symphony by Hans Werner Herze

The Ninth Symphony of the German composer Hans Werner Henze was written in 1997.

It is a choral symphony, subtitled Den Helden und Märtyrern des deutschen Antifaschismus gewidmet (Dedicated to the heroes and martyrs of German anti-fascism). The text, written by the poet Hans-Ulrich Treichel, is based on the 1942 novel Das siebte Kreuz (The Seventh Cross) by Anna Seghers, in which seven prisoners attempt to escape the Westhofen concentration camp, only one of them surviving. According to the composer, the symphony deals with themes that have preoccupied him since he was conscripted to the German Army as a young man during World War II. His earlier Requiem is in many ways a precursor to this work.

Across its seven movements, and in parallel with the novel, it recounts the story of a fugitive from the Nazis, with depictions of the callousness of small-town torture and 'official' police reporting and the felling of plane trees to make crosses with which to crucify recaptured fugitives (movements two and three). The sixth movement is a delirious episode in a cathedral where the fugitive's faithless encounter with Christian imagery is contrasted with the death of an escapee in the previous movement, and the arrival of attack dogs at the end. The final movement depicts the fugitive's eventual escape in a ship (sailing down the Rhine in the novel). However, the ending, like much else in the work, is ambiguous, contrasting the individual's successful escape with the fact that the general threat remains at large.

== Movements ==
There are seven movements:

1. Die Flucht (Escape)
2. Bei den Toten (Among the Dead)
3. Bericht der Verfolger (The Persecutors' Report)
4. Der Platane spricht (The Plane Tree Speaks)
5. Der Sturz (The Fall)
6. Nachts in Dom (Night in the Cathedral)
7. Die Rettung (The Rescue)

== Premiere ==
It was premiered on 11 September 1997 at the Philharmonie, Berlin with the Berlin Radio Choir and the Berliner Philharmoniker conducted by Ingo Metzmacher. The performance was also recorded by EMI.
