= Das Floß der Medusa =

1967 oratorio by Hans Werner Henze

- Oratorio by Hans Werner Henze
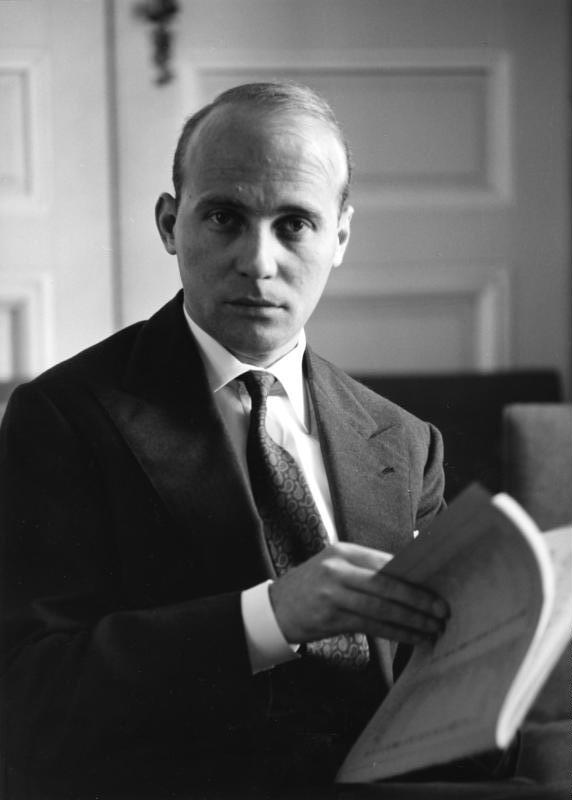
- The composer in 1960
- English: The Raft of the Medusa
- Text: by Ernst Schnabel, including passages from Dante's Divina Comedia
- Language: German; Italian
- Based on: Events on the French frigate Méduse in 1816
- Dedication: Requiem for Che Guevara
- Performed: 29 January 1971: Musikverein, Vienna
- Scoring: soprano; baritone; choirs; large orchestra

Das Floß der Medusa (The Raft of the Medusa) is a 1967 secular oratorio by the German composer Hans Werner Henze. It is regarded as a seminal work in the composer's alignment with left-wing politics.

== Background ==
Henze wrote it in 1967 to a text by Ernst Schnabel as a Requiem for Che Guevara. It tells the story of the French frigate Méduse which ran aground off the west coast of Africa in 1816, an ignominious episode in French political and maritime history, immortalised by the 1818-19 painting of the same name by Théodore Géricault. The oratorio employs a large orchestra, a speaker, a soprano, a baritone, and choruses. In the course of a performance, the chorus members move from left side of the stage, "the Side of the Living", to the right side, "the Side of the Dead". The text is principally in German, with the addition of passages in Italian drawn from Dante's Divina Comedia sung by some of the dead. Aside from the dedication, and one possible musical reference to a popular left-wing slogan chant of the 1960s, "there's very little else in the text or music to arouse political emotions", wrote one critic. He thought the work "expertly put together, scintillating in its scoring and at [its] best moments ... a superheated, expressionist narrative."

== Performance history ==
The first performance was scheduled for 9 December 1968 at the Planten un Blomen Hall in Hamburg. Just before it was due to begin, a student hung a large poster of Che Guevara on the rostrum rail, which was torn down by an official from NDR radio. Some students then hoisted the Red Flag and another Che portrait; some anarchists raised the Black Flag. At this point, although Henze and soloists had arrived onstage, the RIAS choir started chanting "Under the Red Flag we sing not" and left the stage. After some scuffles, the police arrived and began removing the students, taking Schnabel with them. Henze reappeared, stating that the police intervention had made a performance impossible, and led part of the audience in a chant of "Ho, Ho, Ho Chi Minh!" before they dispersed, the premiere cancelled.

However, prior to the aborted performance a recording of the dress rehearsal was made, with soloists Edda Moser, Dietrich Fischer-Dieskau, Charles Régnier, several choirs and the Sinfonieorchester des Norddeutschen Rundfunks, conducted by the composer.

It was finally premiered at a concert performance at the Musikverein in Vienna on 29 January 1971, and its first stage production was given at the Staatstheater Nürnberg on 15 April 1972. Henze revised the work in 1990, and it has been performed on several occasions since, notably in 2006 by the Berlin Philharmonic conducted by Sir Simon Rattle at the Berliner Philharmonie concert hall.

== Roles ==
- La Mort (soprano)
- Jean Charles (baritone)
- Charon (narrator)
- Chorus of the Living
- Chorus of the Dead (mixed choir)
- Children's choir

== Structure ==
=== Part 1 ===
Die Einschiffung zum Untergang [embarkation for disaster]

1. Prolog des Charon
2. Motto "Vom Hafen aus..."
3. Ordre und Musterrolle [Order of the Day and Roll-call] "Vive le roi!"
4. Journal der Überfahrt [journal of the passage] "Die See war still..."
5. Eine Antwort [an answer] "Den Bänken von Arguin..."
6. Versuch zur Rettung [rescue attempt] "Drei Tage Kampf um das Schiff..."
7. Die Ausschiffung [disambarkation] "Wir standen an der Reling..."
8. Ballade vom Verrat [ballad of betrayal] "Wir schauten auf..."
9. Gesang mit neuen Stimmen [hymn for new voices] "Per correr migliori acque..."
10. Anweisungen für den zweiten Tag [instructions for the second day] "Es kam der zweite Tag..."

=== Part 2 ===
Die neunte Nacht und der Morgen [ninth night and the morning]

11. Feststellung der Lage [situation report] "Ein Ende vor Augen..."
12. Motto "Wieviele Königreiche..."
13. Appell unter dem Monde [roll-call under the moon] "La luna, quasi a mezza notte tarda..."
14. Die Rechnung zum Tode [reckoning to death] "Mitternacht"
15. Die Ballade vom Mann auf dem Floß [the ballad of the man on the raft] "Da ging ein Mann über das Floß..."
16. Fuge der Überlebenden und Ankündigung der Rettung [fugue of the survivors and prospect of rescue] "Wir haben kein Gesetz..."
17. Finale "Schau auf!"
