= Voices (Henze) =

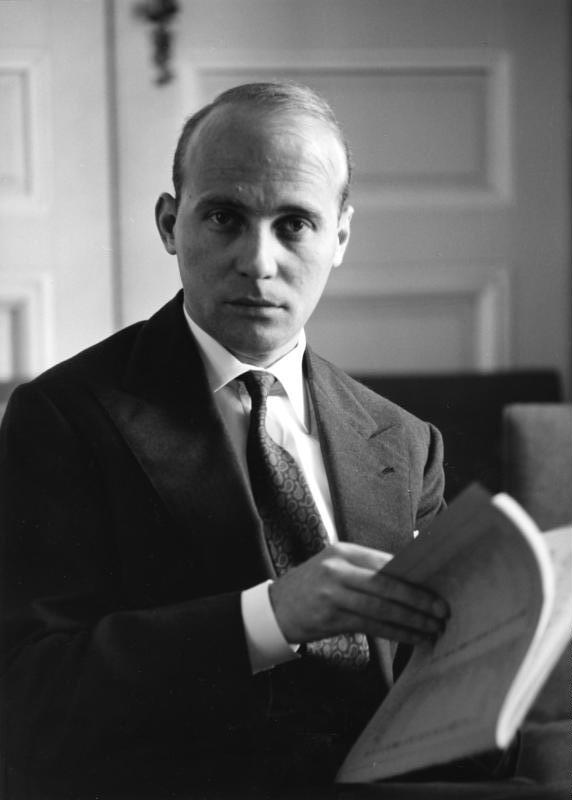
Hans Werner Henze in 1960

Voices is a musical composition by the German composer Hans Werner Henze.

Written between January and June 1973, it is a collection of 22 independent songs which may be performed individually, with alterations to the instrumentation. In its full version, it is written for mezzo-soprano, tenor, electronics and fifteen instrumentalists who are required to play about 70 different instruments from all over the world. The piece consists of two parts (11 + 11 songs) and lasts 90 minutes. The polystylistic conception of "Voices" results from the different origin and message of the poems.

The songs set a diverse range of words, almost all of which are from the twentieth century, the linking theme being alienation and oppression. Henze has said:

The voices of the title are those of young and old artists whose work is politically committed. These people are concerned with their fellow human beings, with the contemporary human condition within the world around them and with all the problems of race and class in which they themselves often seem fated to be embroiled.

: „'Stimmen' für Hans Werner Henze. Die 22 Lieder aus 'Voices'“. Editor Peter Petersen, Hanns-Werner Heister and Hartmut Lück, Mainz, Schott 1996.

It was premiered on 4 January 1974 at the Queen Elizabeth Hall, London with soloists Paul Sperry and Rose Taylor, and the London Sinfonietta conducted by Henze. In 1978 it was recorded the same forces, except Sarah Walker who took the mezzo role.

== Songs ==
1. 'Los poetas cubanos ya no sueñan' ('Cuban Poets Do Not Sleep Anymore') (Heberto Padilla)
2. 'Prison Song' (Ho Chi Minh)
3. 'Keiner oder alle' ('All or None') (Bertolt Brecht)
4. 'The electric cop' (Victor Hernandez Cruz)
5. 'The distant drum' (Calvin C. Hernton)
6. '42 Schulkinder' (Schoolchildren) (Erich Fried)
7. 'Caino' (Gino de Sanctis)
8. 'Il Pasi' (Mario Tobino)
9. 'Heimkehr' ('Homecoming') (Heinrich Heine)
10. 'Grecia 1970' ('Greece 1970') (Giuseppe Ungaretti)
11. 'Legende von der Enstehung des Buches Taoteking auf dem Weg des Laotse in die Emigration' ('Legend of the Origin of the Book Tao Te Ching on Lao Tzu's Way into Exile') (Brecht)
12. 'Gedanken eines Revuemädchens während des Entkleidungsaktes' ('Thoughts of a Showgirl as She Strips') (Brecht)
13. 'Das wirkliche Messer' ('The Real Knife') (Hans Magnus Enzensberger)
14. 'Recht und Billig' ('A Fair Deal') (Fried)
15. 'Patria' (Miguel Barnet)
16. 'Screams - Interlude' (Walton Smith)
17. 'The worker' (Richard W. Thomas)
18. 'Para aconsejar a una dama' ('Advice to a Lady') (Padilla)
19. 'Roses and revolutions' (Dudley Randall)
20. 'Vermutung über Hessen' ('Conjecture about Hessen') (F.C. Delius)
21. 'Schluss' ('An End') (Michalis Katsaros)
22. 'Das Blumenfest' ('Carnival of Flowers') (Enzensberger)
