= Symphony No. 6 (Henze) =

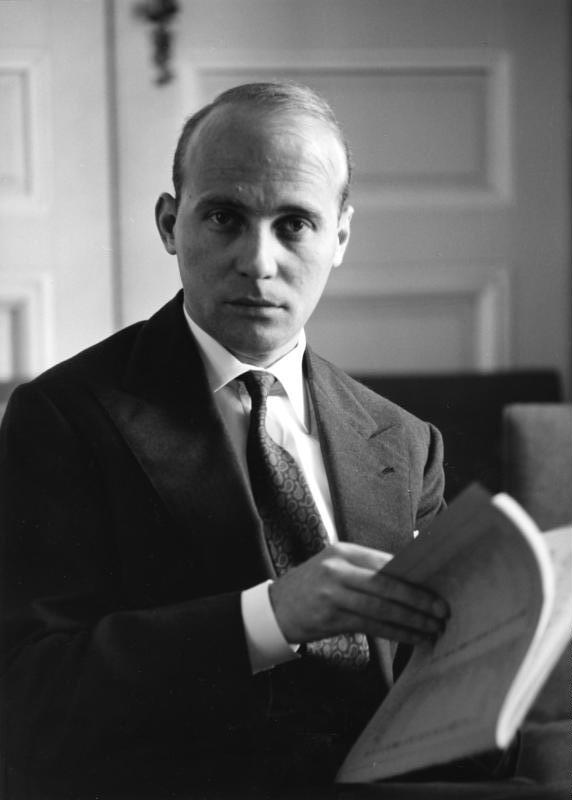
Hans Werner Henze in 1960

Symphony No. 6 for two chamber orchestras by Hans Werner Henze was written in 1969.

It was written while the composer was living in Cuba and marks a departure in the composer's symphonic output: whilst the previous five symphonies were more straightforwardly lyrical, the Sixth Symphony has a more overtly political theme, in common with other Henze works of this period. Henze himself said it was written using

experiences of a bourgeois who had been writing music to the ruling class for 20 years to compose against the bourgeoisie. Instead of nostalgia and scepticism I wanted affirmation, direct avowal of revolution.

Henze included quotations from the song of the Vietnamese Liberation Front, 'Stars in the Night', first heard played on the banjo and also from Mikis Theodorakis' 'Song of Freedom' on the guitar. Henze later improvises on the Cuban dance rhythm 'Son' which he contrasts with the more traditional sound of the European orchestra. However Henze himself has described the work overall as "a Lutheran, Protestant symphony" but with "a Pagan body" and whose "pulse and blood are black"

It was first performed on 26 November 1969 by an orchestra assembled for the occasion at the University of Havana, with the composer conducting. In 1972 the London Symphony Orchestra recorded it, again under the baton of the composer. In 1994 Henze rewrote the improvised passages in full, and the revised symphony was premiered by the Munich Philharmonic Orchestra under Ingo Metzmacher.

It is in three sections, although these run contiguously.

== Movements ==
Part I

1. ♩ = 92
2. un poco meno mosso (Fig. D, p. 23)
3. meno mosso (p. 32)
4. Corona (p. 39)
5. meno mosso del tempo I (Fig. P, p. 51)

Part II

1. Lento (Fig. T, p. 63)
2. "Song to Freedom" (Fig. V, p. 69)
3. Largo (Fig. X, p. 77)
4. ♩ = 66 (p. 78)
5. ♩ = 66 (p. 83)
6. ♩ = 92 (p. 88)

Part III

1. piu mosso (p. 102)
2. meno mosso (Fig. MM, p. 110)
3. piu mosso, con fuoco (Fig. OO, p. 113)
4. ♩ = 100 (Fig. SS, p. 121)
