= Hans Werner Henze =

German composer (1926–2012)

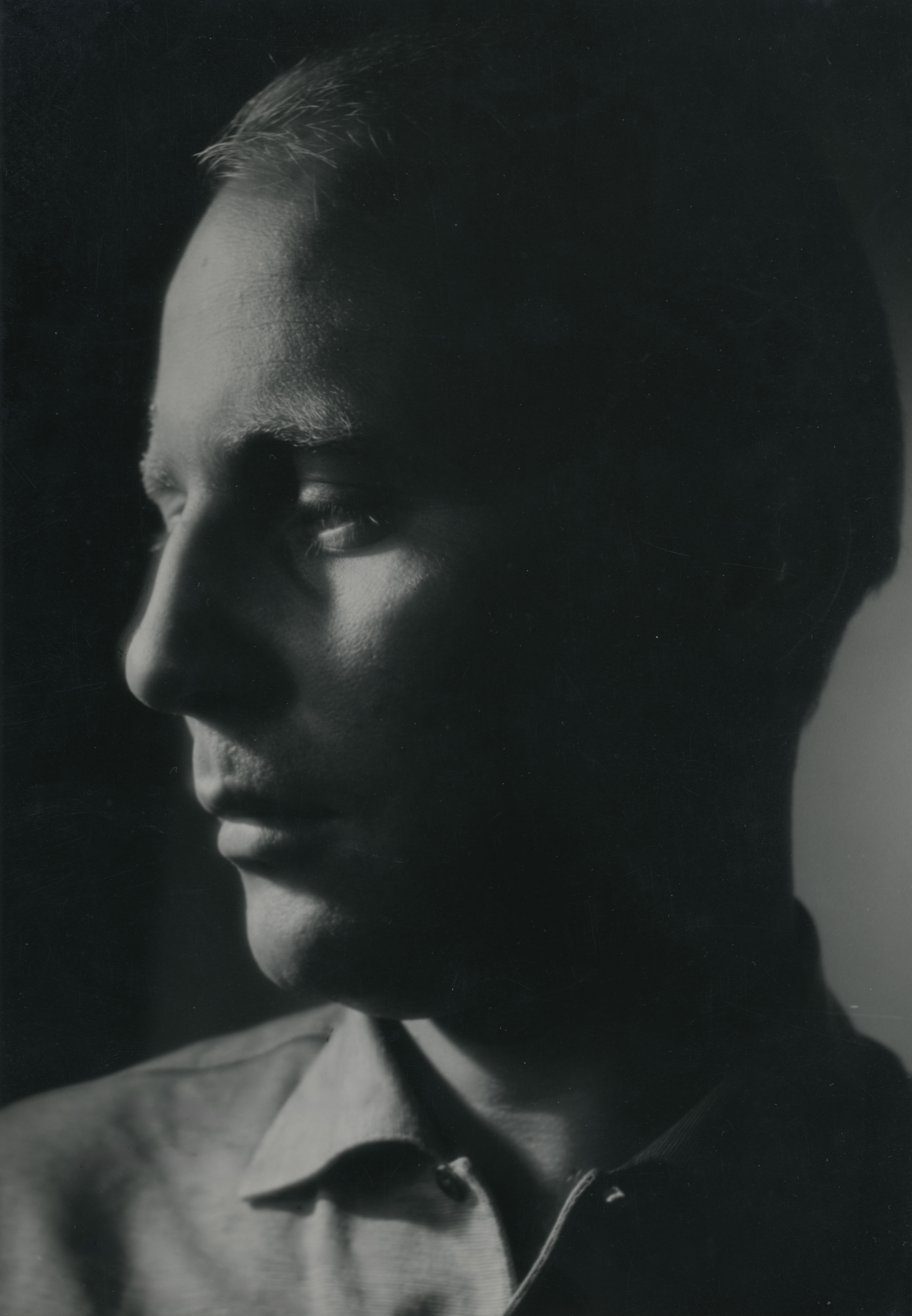
- Henze in 1962
- Born: 1 July 1926; Gütersloh, Prussia, Germany
- Died: 27 October 2012 (aged 86); Dresden, Saxony, Germany
- Education: Heidelberg University
- Occupation: Classical composer
- Organizations: Hessisches Staatstheater Wiesbaden; Cantiere Internazionale d'Arte; Munich Biennale
- Partner: Fausto Moroni (died 2007)
- Awards: Ernst von Siemens Music Prize; Praemium Imperiale; Deutscher Tanzpreis

Signature
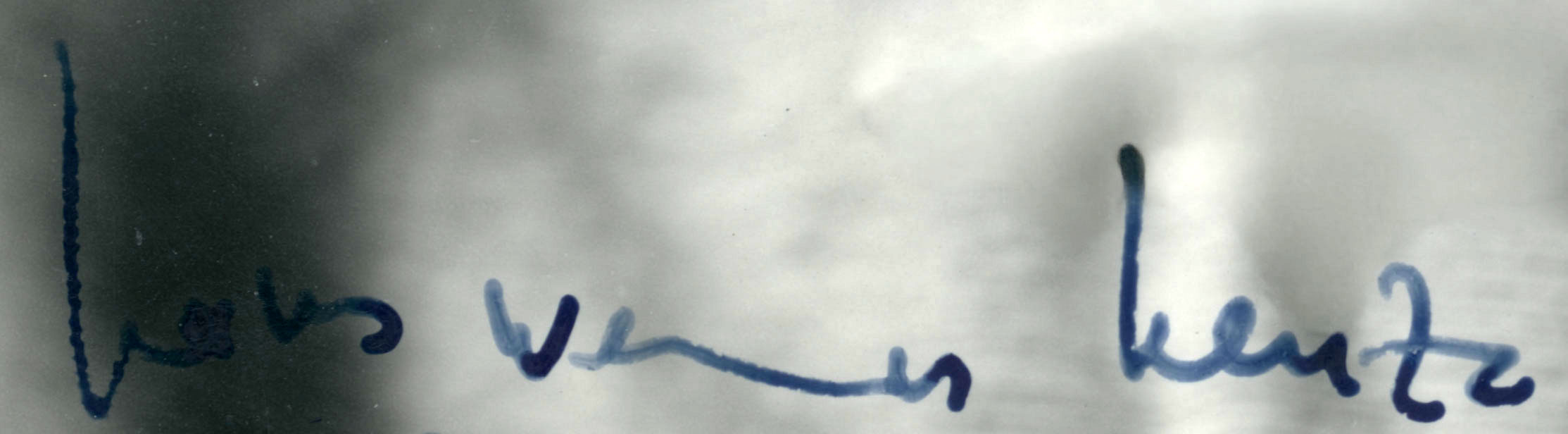

Hans Werner Henze (1 July 1926 – 27 October 2012) was a German composer. His large oeuvre is extremely varied in style, having been influenced by serialism, atonality, Neoclassicism, Italian music, Arabic music and jazz, as well as traditional schools of German composition. In particular, his stage works reflect "his consistent cultivation of music for the theatre throughout his life".

Henze was also known for his political convictions. He left Germany for Italy in 1953 because of a perceived intolerance towards his leftist politics and homosexuality. Late in life he lived in the village of Marino in the central Italian region of Lazio, and in his final years still travelled extensively, in particular to Britain and Germany, as part of his work. An avowed Marxist and member of the Italian Communist Party, Henze produced compositions honoring Ho Chi Minh and Che Guevara. At the 1968 Hamburg premiere of his requiem for Che Guevara, titled Das Floß der Medusa (The Raft of Medusa), the placing of a red flag on the stage sparked a riot and the arrest of several people, including the librettist. Henze spent a year from 1969 to 1970 teaching in Cuba.

== Life and works ==
=== Early years ===
Henze was born in Gütersloh, Westphalia, the eldest of six children of a teacher, and showed an early interest in art and music. That and his political views led to conflict with his conservative father. Henze's father, Franz, had served in the First World War and was wounded at Verdun. He worked as a teacher in a school at Bielefeld, formed on progressive lines, but it was closed in 1933 by government order because its progressive style was out of step with official views. Franz Henze then moved to Dünne, a small village near Bünde, where he fell under the spell of Nazi propaganda. Books by Jewish and Christian authors were replaced in the Henze household by literature reflecting Nazi views; the whole family was expected to fall into line with Franz's new thinking. The older boys, including Hans, were enrolled in the Hitler Youth.

Although the Henze household was filled with talk of current affairs, Hans was also able to hear broadcasts of classical music (especially Mozart) and eventually his father realized that his son had a vocation as a musician. Henze began studies at the state music school of Braunschweig in 1942, where he studied piano, percussion, and theory. Franz Henze rejoined the army in 1943 and he was sent to the Eastern front, where he died. Henze had to break off his studies after being conscripted into the army in 1944, towards the end of the Second World War. He was trained as a radio operator. He was soon captured by the British and held in a prisoner-of-war camp for the remainder of the war. In 1945 he became an accompanist in the Bielefeld City Theatre, and continued his studies under Wolfgang Fortner at Heidelberg University in 1946.

Henze had some successful performances at Darmstadt, including an immediate success in 1946 with a neo-baroque work for piano, flute and strings, that brought him to the attention of Schott's, the music publishers. He also took part in the famous Darmstadt New Music Summer School, a key vehicle for the propagation of avant-garde techniques. At the 1947 summer school, Henze turned to serial technique.

In his early years he worked with twelve-tone technique, for example in his First Symphony and First Violin Concerto of 1947. Sadler's Wells Ballet visited Hamburg in 1948; this inspired Henze to write a choreographic poem, Ballett-Variationen, which he completed in 1949. The first ballet he saw was Frederick Ashton's Scènes de Ballet. He wrote a letter of appreciation to Ashton, introducing himself as a 22-year-old composer. The next time he wrote to Ashton he enclosed the score of his Ballett-Variationen, which he hoped Ashton might find of interest. This work was first performed in Düsseldorf in September 1949 and staged for the first time in Wuppertal in 1958. In 1948 he became musical assistant at the Deutscher Theater in Konstanz, where his first opera Das Wundertheater, based on the work of Cervantes, was created.

In 1950 he became ballet conductor at the Hessisches Staatstheater Wiesbaden in Wiesbaden, where he composed two operas for radio, his First Piano Concerto, as well as his first stage work of real note, the jazz-influenced opera Boulevard Solitude, a modern recasting of the traditional Manon Lescaut story. His ballet Ondine was composed for the English Royal Ballet and choreographed by Ashton, for production in 1958.

=== Move to Italy ===
Henze left Germany in 1953, in reaction to homophobia and the country's general political climate. His publisher, Schott's, had also offered Henze an advance on royalties, on condition that he leave his conducting posts to focus on composition. This financial incentive allowed Henze to move to Italy, where he remained for most of his life. He settled on the island of Ischia in the Gulf of Naples. Also residents on the island were the composer William Walton and his wife Susana, who took a great interest in the young German composer. Henze's Quattro poemi for orchestra in 1955 made clear that he had moved far from the principles of the Darmstadt avant-garde. In January 1956 he left Ischia and moved to the mainland to live in Naples. Initially he suffered further disappointment, with controversial premieres of the opera König Hirsch, based on a text by Carlo Gozzi, and the ballet Maratona di danza, with a libretto by Luchino Visconti. However, he then began a long-lasting and fruitful creative partnership with the poet Ingeborg Bachmann. Working with her as librettist, he composed the operas Der Prinz von Homburg (1958) based on a text by Heinrich von Kleist and Der junge Lord (1964) after Wilhelm Hauff, as well as Serenades and Arias (1957) and his Choral Fantasy (1964).

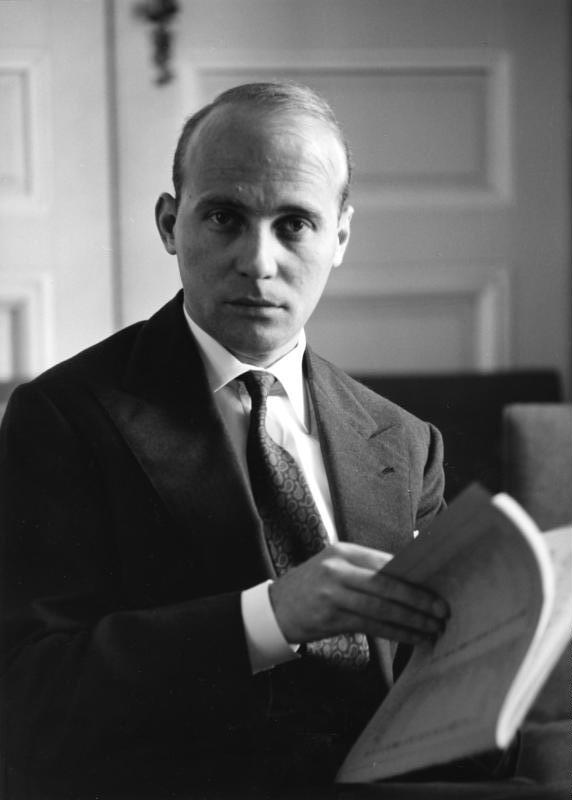
Henze in 1960

He composed his Five Neapolitan Songs for Dietrich Fischer-Dieskau soon after his arrival in Naples. A later sojourn in Greece provided the opportunity to complete his Hölderlin-based work Kammermusik 1958, dedicated to Benjamin Britten and premiered by the tenor Peter Pears, the guitarist Julian Bream and an eight-member chamber ensemble.

Henze moved in 1961 to a secluded villa, 'La Leprara', on the hills of Marino, overlooking the River Tiber south of Rome. This time also signalled a strong leaning towards music involving the voice.

From 1962 until 1967, Henze taught masterclasses in composition at the Mozarteum in Salzburg, and in 1967 he became a visiting professor at Dartmouth College in New Hampshire. One of his greatest successes was the premiere of the opera Die Bassariden at the Salzburg Festival.

In the following period, he greatly strengthened his political involvement which also influenced his musical work. For example, the première of his oratorio Das Floß der Medusa in Hamburg failed when his West Berlin collaborators refused to perform under a portrait of Che Guevara, objecting also to a revolutionary flag that had been placed on the stage. His politics also influenced his Sixth Symphony (1969), Second Violin Concerto (1971), Voices (1973), and his piece for spoken word and chamber orchestra, El Cimarrón, based on a book by Cuban author Miguel Barnet about escaped black slaves during Cuba's colonial period.

=== An established composer ===
His political critique reached its high point in 1976 with the premiere of his opera We Come to the River.

In the same year Henze founded the Cantiere Internazionale d'Arte in Montepulciano for the promotion of new music, where his children's opera Pollicino premiered in 1980. From 1980 until 1991 he led a class in composition in the Cologne Music School. In 1981 he founded the Mürztal Workshops in the Austrian region of Styria, the same region where he set up the Deutschlandsberg Youth Music Festival in 1984. In 1988 he founded the Munich Biennale, an "international festival for new music theatre", of which he was the artistic director.

His own operas became more conventional once more, for example The English Cat (1983), and Das verratene Meer (1990), based on Yukio Mishima's novel Gogo no Eiko, known in English as The Sailor Who Fell from Grace with the Sea.

His later works, while less controversial, continued his political and social engagement. His Requiem (1990–93) comprised nine 'sacred concertos' for piano, trumpet and chamber orchestra, and was written in memory of Michael Vyner, the artistic director of the London Sinfonietta. The choral Ninth Symphony (1997), which is dedicated to the "heroes and martyrs of German anti-fascism," is set to a libretto by Hans-Ulrich Treichel, based on motifs from the novel The Seventh Cross by Anna Seghers. It is a rejection of Nazism, which Henze himself had experienced in his youth. His last success was the 2003 premiere of the opera L'Upupa und der Triumph der Sohnesliebe (English: The Hoopoe and the Triumph of Filial Love) at the Salzburg Festival, with a text he wrote himself, based on a Syrian fairy tale. Other late compositions include Sebastian im Traum (2004) for large orchestra and the opera Phaedra (2007).

Henze lived with his partner Fausto Moroni from the early sixties, and Moroni planned and planted the hillside garden around La Leprara. Moroni cared for the composer when he suffered a nervous breakdown during which he barely spoke and had to be encouraged to eat. In 2007, shortly after Henze's sudden recovery, Moroni died after a lengthy battle with cancer. Elogium Musicum (2008), for large orchestra and chorus singing Henze's own Latin text, is a memorial to his partner of more than forty years.

In 1995 Henze received the Westphalian Music Prize, which has carried his name since 2001. Invited by Walter Fink, he was the tenth composer featured in the annual Komponistenporträt of the Rheingau Musik Festival in 2000, but owing to illness he did not attend. The music included his Requiem. On 7 November 2004, Henze received an honorary doctorate in musicology from the Hochschule für Musik und Theater München (University for Music and Performing Arts, Munich). In 1975 he became an Honorary Member of the Royal Academy of Music, London. The English version of his autobiography, Bohemian Fifths, was published in 1998.

Shortly before Henze's death, Donald Macleod interviewed him for the BBC Radio 3 series Composer of the Week (broadcast ca 2010, including recordings of Henze's works). In 2023 extracts from these interviews were rebroadcast in a special series celebrating the eightieth anniversary of the programme.

Henze died in Dresden on 27 October 2012 at the age of 86.

== Works ==
Henze's music has incorporated neoclassicism, jazz, the twelve-tone technique, serialism, and some rock or popular music. Although he did study atonalism early in his career, after his move to Italy in 1953 Henze's music became considerably more Neapolitan in style. His opera König Hirsch ("The Stag King") contains lush, rich textures. This trend is carried further in the opulent ballet music that he wrote for English choreographer Frederick Ashton's Ondine, completed in 1957. While Mendelssohn and Weber were important influences, the music for Ondine contains some jazz and there is much in it redolent of Stravinsky—not only Stravinsky the neo-classical composer, but also the composer of The Rite of Spring. His Maratona di danza, on the other hand, required much tighter integration of jazz elements, complete with an on-stage band, which was very different from the more romantic Ondine. Henze received much of the impetus for his ballet music from his earlier job as ballet adviser at the Hessisches Staatstheater Wiesbaden.

The textures for the cantata Kammermusik (1958, rev. 1963) are far harsher; Henze returned to atonalism in Antifone, and later the other styles mentioned above again became important in his music.

== Awards ==
- Ernst von Siemens Music Prize (1990)
- Praemium Imperiale (2000)
- Deutscher Tanzpreis (2001)
- Knight Commander's Cross of the Order of Merit of the Federal Republic of Germany (2008)
