= List of compositions by Sofia Gubaidulina =

Sofia Gubaidulina
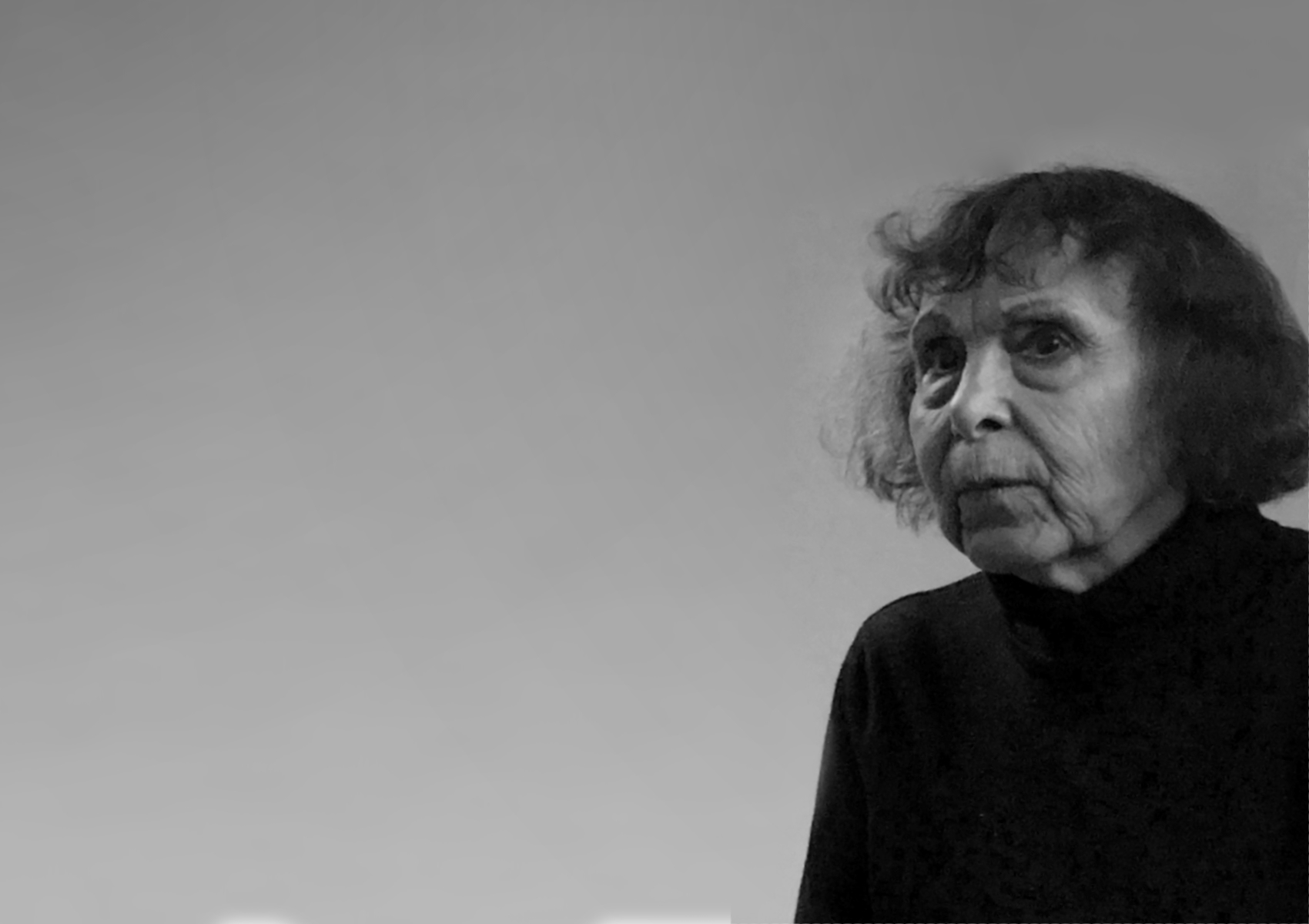
- Born: Sofia Asgatovna Gubaidulina; 24 October 1931; Chistopol, Tatar ASSR, Russian SFSR, USSR
- Died: 13 March 2025 (aged 93); Appen, Schleswig-Holstein, Germany

This is an incomplete list of compositions by the Russian composer Sofia Gubaidulina (1931–2025). She was highly prolific, producing numerous chamber, orchestral and choral works. Her output has been described as exploring the tensions between Western and Eastern music, and is characterised by "innovative use of microtonality and chromaticism, rhythm over form and a use of contrasting tonalities.

Gubaidulina incorporated unusual instrumental combinations. In Erwartung ("In Anticipation") combines a range of percussion instruments (bongos, güiros, temple blocks, cymbals and tam-tams among others) with a saxophone quartet. Melodically, she uses frequent and intense chromatic motifs rather than long melodic phrases. She sought to use music to attain unity with the divine. She achieved this through the use of micro-chromaticism (i.e., quarter tones) and frequent glissandi. Explaining her use of harmonics, specifically in her Rejoice! sonata for violin and cello, Gubaidulina said that "the possibility for string instruments to derive pitches of various heights at one and the same place on the string can be experienced in music as the transition to another plane of existence. And that is joy.

Asked in 2011 about her increasing prolificacy as she got older and if she ever felt like slowing down, Gubaidulina replied that she had "many interesting projects, more than I can ever make...and there are always new soundscapes to explore."

== Works ==
=== Orchestral ===
- Fairytale Poem for orchestra (1971)
- Steps for speaking chorus and orchestra (1972, rev. 186, 1992)
- Revue Music for symphony orchestra and jazz band (1976, rev. 1995, 2002)
- Te Salutant, capriccio (1978)
- Stimmen... Verstummen... symphony in twelve movements (1986)
- Pro et Contra (1989)
- The Unasked Answer (Antwort ohne Frage) collage for three orchestras (1989)
- Figures of Time (Фигуры времени) for large orchestra (1994)
- The Rider on the White Horse for large orchestra and organ (2002)
- The Light of the End (Свет конца) for large orchestra (2003)
- Feast During a Plague for large orchestra (2006)
- Der Zorn Gottes for orchestra (2020)

=== Concertante ===
- Detto II for cello and ensemble (1972)
- Concerto for bassoon and low strings (1975)
- Introitus concerto for piano and chamber orchestra (1978)
- Offertorium (Жертвоприношение) concerto for violin and orchestra (1980, rev. 1982, 1986)
- Sieben Worte for cello, bayan, and strings (1982)
- And: The Feast is in Full Procession (И: Празднество в разгаре) for cello and orchestra (1993)
- Music for Flute, Strings, and Percussion (1994)
- Impromptu for flute (concert flute and alto flute), violin, and strings (1996)
- Concerto for viola and orchestra (1996)
- The Canticle of the Sun of St Francis of Assisi for cello, chamber choir and percussion (1997)
- Two Paths: A Dedication to Mary and Martha for two viola solo and orchestra (1998)
- Im Schatten des Baumes (В тени под деревом) for standard koto, bass koto, zheng, and orchestra (1998)
- Under the Sign of Scorpio variants on six hexachords for bayan and large orchestra (2003)
- ...The Deceitful Face of Hope and Despair for flute and orchestra (2005)
- In Tempus Praesens, concerto for violin and orchestra (2007)
- Glorious Percussion, concerto for percussion and orchestra (2008)
- Fachwerk, concerto for bayan, percussion and strings (2009)
- Warum? for flute, clarinet and string orchestra (2014)
- Concerto for violin, cello and bayan (2017)
- Dialog: Ich und Du, concerto for violin and orchestra (2018)

=== Vocal/choral ===
- Phacelia, vocal cycle for soprano and orchestra based on Mikhail Prishvin's poem (1956)
- Night in Memphis, cantata for mezzo-soprano, orchestra and male choir on tape (1968)
- Rubaijat, cantata for baryton and chamber ensemble (1969)
- Roses for soprano and piano (1972)
- Counting Rhymes for voice and piano (1973)
- Hour of the Soul poem by Marina Tsvetaeva for large wind orchestra and mezzo-soprano/contralto (1974), for percussion, mezzo-soprano, and large orchestra (1976)
- Laudatio Pacis, oratorio for soprano, alto, tenor, bass, speaker, 3 mixed choirs and large orchestra without strings (1975)
- Perception for soprano, baritone (speaking voices) and 7 string instruments (1983, rev. 1986)
- Hommage à Marina Tsvetayeva for a cappella choir (1984)
- Letter to the Poetess Rimma Dalo for soprano and cello (1985)
- Ein Walzerpass nach Johann Strauss for soprano and octet, also arranged for piano and string quintet (1987)
- Hommage à T.S. Eliot for soprano and octet (1987)
- Two Songs on German Folk Poetry for (mezzo-)soprano, flute, harpsichord and cello (1988)
- Jauchzt vor Gott for mixed choir and organ (1989)
- Alleluja for mixed chorus, boy soprano, organ and large orchestra (1990)
- Aus dem Stundenbuch on a text of Rainer Maria Rilke for cello, orchestra, male choir, and a woman speaker (1991)
- Lauda for alto, tenor, baritone, narrator, mixed choir, and large orchestra (1991)
- Jetzt immer Schnee (Теперь всегда снега) on verses of Gennadi Aigi for chamber ensemble and chamber choir (1993)
- Ein Engel for contralto and double bass (1994)
- Aus den Visionen der Hildegard von Bingen for contralto (1994)
- Galgenlieder à 3 for mezzo-soprano, percussion, and double bass (1996)
- Galgenlieder à 5 for mezzo-soprano flute, percussion, bayan, and double bass (1996)
- Sonnengesang, St. Francis of Assisi's Canticle of the Sun for violoncello, mixed choir and percussion (1997)
- Johannes-Passion for soprano, tenor, baritone, bass, two mixed choirs, organ, and large orchestra (2000)
- Johannes-Ostern for soprano, tenor, baritone, bass, two mixed choirs, organ, and large orchestra (2001)
- O Komm, Heiliger Geist for soprano, bass, mixed choir and orchestra (2015)
- Über Liebe und Hass for soprano, tenor, baritone, bass, two mixed choirs and orchestra, in 9 movements (2015, rev. 2016) and in 15 movements (2016, rev. 2018)

=== Solo instrumental ===
- Serenade for guitar (1960)
- Chaconne for piano (1963)
- Piano Sonata (1965)
- Toccata for guitar (1969)
- Musical Toys for piano (1969)
- Toccata-Troncata for piano (1971)
- Ten Preludes for cello (1974), also version as Eight Etudes for double bass (2009)
- Invention for piano (1974)
- Hell und Dunkel for organ (1976)
- Sonatina for flute (1978)
- De Profundis for bayan (1978)
- Et Exspecto, sonata for bayan (1986)
- Ritorno perpetuo for harpsichord (1997)
- Cadenza for bayan (2003, rev. 2011)

=== Chamber/ensemble ===
- Quintet for piano, two violins, viola, and cello (1957)
- Allegro Rustico for flute and piano (1963)
- Five Etudes for harp, double bass and percussion (1965)
- Pantomime for double bass and piano (1966)
- Musical Toys fourteen piano pieces for children (1969)
- Vivente – Non Vivente for electronics (1970)
- Concordanza for chamber ensemble (1971)
- String Quartet No. 1 (1971)
- Music for Harpsichord and Percussion Instruments from Mark Pekarsky's Collection (1971, rev. 1973)
- Rumore e silenzio for percussion and harpsichord (1974)
- Quattro for two trumpets and two trombones (1974)
- Sonata for double bass and piano (1975)
- Two Ballads for two trumpets and piano (1976)
- Dots, Lines and Zigzag for bass clarinet and piano (1976)
- Trio for three trumpets (1976)
- Lied ohne Worte (Songs without words) for trumpet and piano (1977)
- On Tatar Folk Themes for domra and piano (1977)
- Duo sonata for two bassoons (1977)
- Lamento for tuba and piano (1977)
- Misterioso for 7 percussionists (1977)
- Quartet for four flutes (1977)
- Detto I, sonata for organ and percussion (1978)
- Sounds of the Forest for flute and piano (1978)
- Two Pieces for horn and piano (1979)
- In Croce for cello and organ (1979), for bayan and cello (1991)
- Jubilatio for 4 percussionists (1979)
- Garten von Freuden und Traurigkeiten for flute, viola, harp and narrator (1980)
- Descensio for 3 trombones, 3 percussionists, harp, harpsichord and piano (1981)
- Rejoice!, sonata for violin and cello (1981)
- Swan, Crab and Pike, march for brass ensemble and percussion (1982)
- In the Beginning There was Rhythm for seven percussionists (1984)
- Quasi hoquetus for viola, bassoon, and piano (1984)
- String Quartet No. 2 (1987), appears on Short Stories
- String Quartet No. 3 (1987)
- String Trio (1988)
- Ein Walzerpass nach Johann Strauss for piano and string quintet, arranged from version for soprano and octet (1989)
- Hörst Du uns, Luigi? Schau mal, welchen Tanz eine einfache Holzrassel für Dich vollführt (Слышишь ты нас, Луиджи? Вот танец, который танцует для тебя обыкновенная деревянная трещотка) for six percussionists (1991)
- Gerade und ungerade (Чет и нечет) for seven percussionists, including cymbalom (1991)
- Silenzio for bayan, violin, and cello (1991)
- Tartarische Tanz for bayan and two contrabass (1992)
- Dancer on a Tightrope (Der Seiltänzer) for violin and string piano (1993)
- Meditation über den Bach-Choral "Vor deinen Thron tret' ich hiermit" for harpsichord, two violins, viola, cello, and contrabass (1993)
- ... Early in the Morning, Right before Waking ... for three 17-string Japanese bass kotos and four 13-string Japanese tenor kotos (1993)
- String Quartet No. 4 (a triple quartet for quartet, two taped quartets and ad libitum colored lights, dedicated to the Kronos Quartet) (1993)
- In Erwartung (В ожидании) for saxophone quartet and six percussionists (1994)
- Aus der Visionen der Hildegard von Bingen for alto (1994)
- Quaternion for cello quartet (1996)
- Risonanza for three trumpets, four trombones, organ, and six strings (2001)
- Reflections on the theme B–A–C–H for string quartet (2002)
- Mirage: The Dancing Sun for eight violoncelli (2002)
- On the Edge of Abyss for seven violoncelli and two waterphones (2002)
- Verwandlung (Transformation) for trombone, saxophone quartet, cello, double bass, and tam-tam (2005)
- The Lyre of Orpheus for violin, percussion, and strings (2006)
- Ravvedimento for cello and quartet of guitars (2007)
  - Pentimento, an arrangement for double-bass and three guitars (2007)
  - Repentance, an arrangement for cello, double-bass and three guitars (2008)
- Fantasia on the Theme S–H–E–A for two pianos tuned a quarter-tone apart (2008)
- Sotto voce, for viola, double-bass and two guitars (2010/2013)
- Labyrinth, for 12 celli (2011)
- So sei es, for violin, double-bass, piano, and percussion (2013)
- Pilgrims for violin, double bass, piano and two percussionists (2014)
- Einfaches Gebet, Low Mass for narrator, two celli, double bass, piano and two percussionists (2016)

=== Arrangements ===
- Le Grand Tango by Astor Piazzolla, for violin and piano (1995)

=== Film scores ===
- Adventures of Mowgli (1967–1971)
- Vertical (1967)
- Scarecrow (1984)
- The Kreutzer Sonata (1987)
- The Cat Who Walked by Herself (1988)
- Mary Queen Of Scots (2013)

Compositions by Gubaidulina were used in The Killing of a Sacred Deer.

A more complete list of her scores for animated films may be found on her profile at Animator.ru.

== Sources ==
- Tomes, Susan. "The Piano: A History in 100 Pieces". Yale University Press, 2021. JSTOR j.ctv1t1kfj8
