= Triple Concerto No. 2 =

Triple Concerto No. 2, a composer's second triple concerto, may refer to:

- Concerto for Three Harpsichords and Orchestra No. 2, BWV 1064, a concerto by Johann Sebastian Bach before c. 1742
- Concertante in D, WoO unv 5, Gardi 3, an unfinished concerto by Ludwig van Beethoven
- Triple Concerto No. 2 (Smirnov), a 2003 concerto by Dmitri Smirnov

== See also ==
- Triple concerto
