= Offertorium (disambiguation) =

Offertorium is a concerto for violin and orchestra composed by Sofia Gubaidulina.

Offertorium may also refer to:

- Latin for Offertory, where the alms of a congregation are collected in church, or at any religious service
- A musical setting of the offertory text (see Propers)
