= Op. 139 =

In music, Op. 139 stands for Opus number 139. Compositions that are assigned this number include:

- Czerny – 100 Progressive Studies
- Schumann – "Des Sängers Fluch" (Uhland) for solo voice, chorus and orchestra
- Shostakovich – March of the Soviet Police
- Smirnov – Triple Concerto No. 2
- Strauss II – Kron
