= Bavarian Radio Symphony Orchestra =

German radio orchestra

Coordinates: 48°8′39.6″N 11°33′13.7″E

- Radio orchestra
- Logo since 2023
- Native name: Symphonieorchester des Bayerischen Rundfunks
- Short name: BRSO
- Founded: 1949; 77 years ago
- Location: Munich, Germany
- Concert hall: Philharmonie, Gasteig Cultural Centre; Herkulessaal, Munich Residenz
- Principal conductor: Sir Simon Rattle
- Website: www.brso.de

The Bavarian Radio Symphony Orchestra (German: Symphonieorchester des Bayerischen Rundfunks, BRSO) is a German radio orchestra. Based in Munich, Germany, it is one of the city's four orchestras. The BRSO is one of two full-size symphony orchestras operated under the auspices of Bayerischer Rundfunk, or Bavarian Broadcasting (BR). Its primary concert venues are the Herkulessaal in the Munich Residenz, and while the Philharmonie of the Gasteig Cultural Centre is being renovated, the Isarphilharmonie.

== History ==
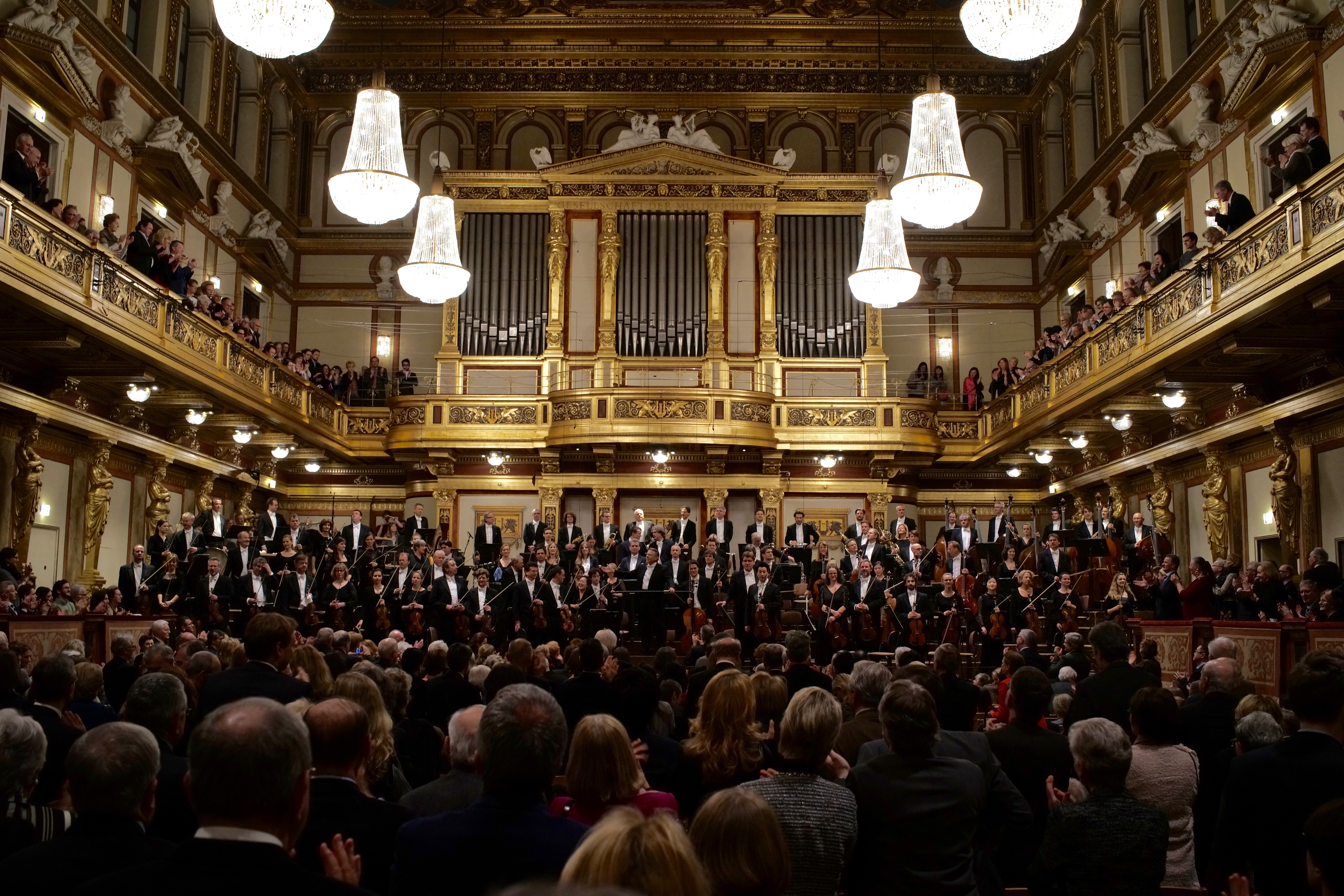
Conductor Mariss Jansons and the orchestra at Grosser Musikvereinssaal

The orchestra was founded in 1949, with members of an earlier radio orchestra in Munich as the core personnel. Eugen Jochum was the orchestra's first chief conductor, from 1949 until 1960. Subsequent chief conductors have included Rafael Kubelík, Sir Colin Davis and Lorin Maazel. Mariss Jansons was the orchestra's chief conductor from 2003 until his death in 2019. Jansons regularly campaigned for a new concert hall during his tenure.

In 2010, Sir Simon Rattle first guest-conducted the BRSO. In January 2021, the BRSO announced the appointment of Rattle as its next chief conductor, effective with the 2023–2024 season, with an initial contract of 5 years. In October 2026, the BRSO announced an extension of Rattle's contract as chief conductor through 2033.

The orchestra participates in the musica viva concerts, founded by the composer Karl Amadeus Hartmann, to this day.

The orchestra has recorded for a number of commercial labels, including Deutsche Grammophon, RCA, and EMI. The orchestra received the 2006 Grammy Award for Best Orchestral Performance for its recording of Shostakovich's 13th Symphony. Since 2009, the orchestra produces recordings under its own BR-Klassik label.

== Chief conductors ==
- Eugen Jochum (1949–1960)
- Rafael Kubelík (1961–1979)
- Sir Colin Davis (1983–1992)
- Lorin Maazel (1993–2002)
- Mariss Jansons (2003–2019)
- Sir Simon Rattle (2023–present)

== Venues ==
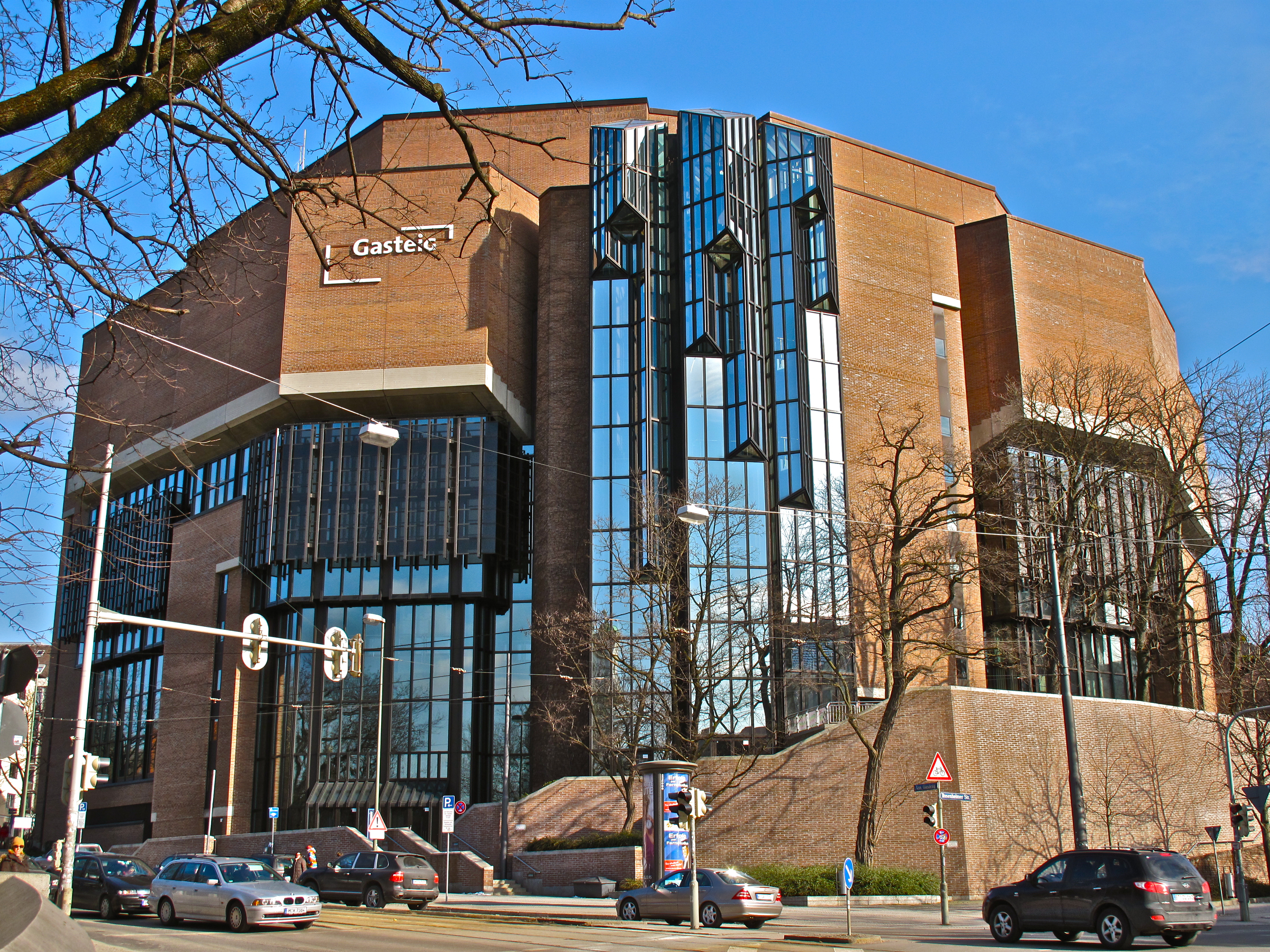
Philharmonie, Gasteig Philharmonie, Munich

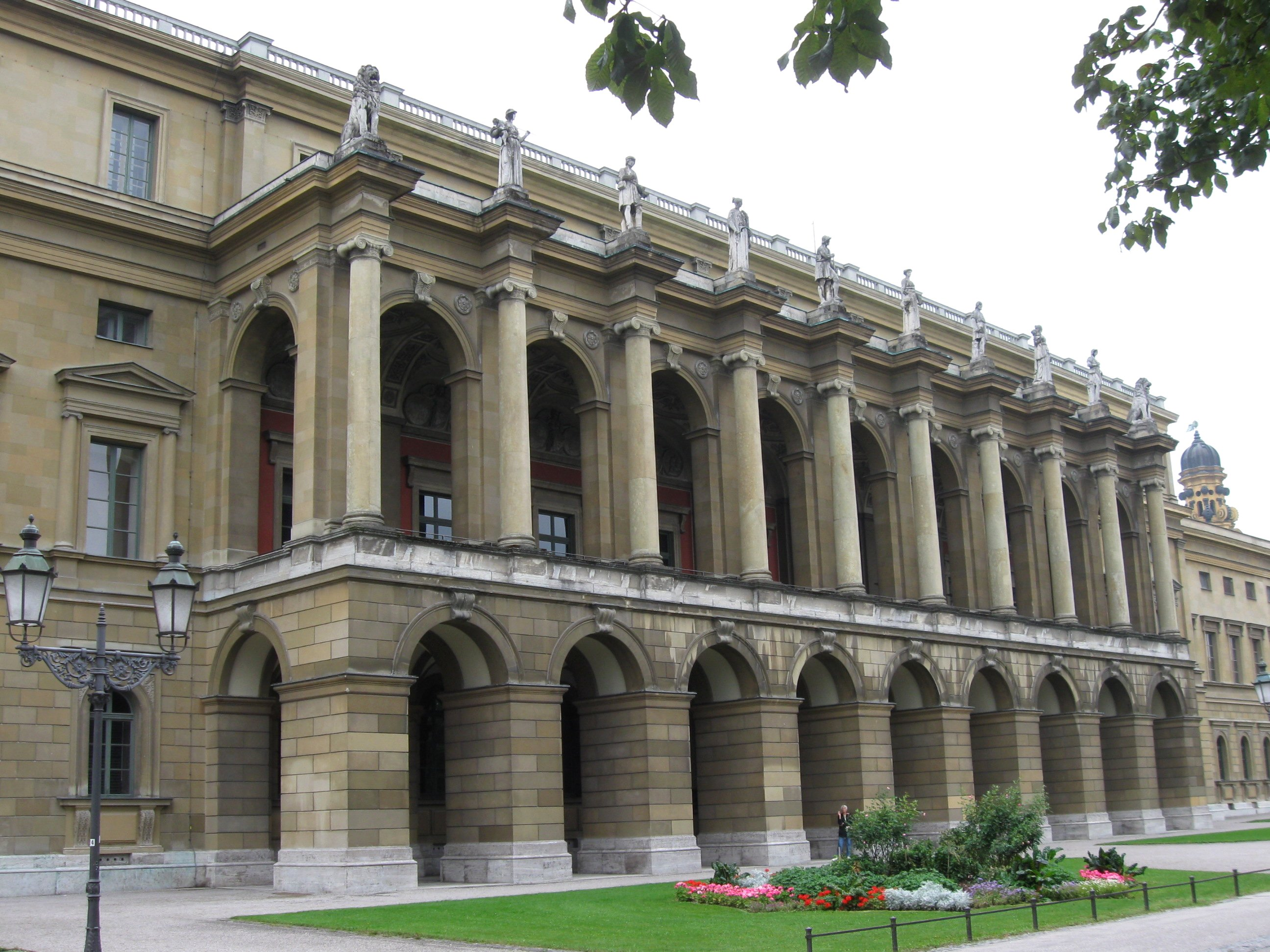
Herkulessaal, Munich Residenz

== Awards ==
The orchestra received a Grammy for Best Orchestral Performance in 2006 for its recording of Shostakovich's Symphony No. 13, under the baton of Mariss Jansons.

== See also ==
- Category:Music commissioned by the Bavarian Radio Symphony Orchestra (2)
