= Triple concerto =

A triple concerto is a concerto with three soloists. Such concertos have been composed from the Baroque period, including works by Corelli, Vivaldi, Bach and Telemann, to the 21st century, such as two works by Dmitri Smirnov. The most famous example is Beethoven's Triple Concerto for violin, cello and piano. His combination of solo instruments, a piano trio, was also used by Jan Václav Voříšek (in his Grand Rondeau concertant of 1825) and was used in several works composed during the twentieth century.

== History ==
Many works in the genre concerto grosso were composed for three solo instruments, including Corelli's concerti grossi, Op. 6, for a trio (concertino) of two violins and cello. 1714. Antonio Vivaldi wrote several concertos for the same combination of instruments, published for example in L'estro armonico in 1711. Based on Italian models, Johann Sebastian Bach composed concertos for multiple instruments, including his Fourth Brandenburg Concerto, BWV 1049, with solo parts for violin and two recorders, his Fifth Brandenburg Concerto, BWV 1050, featuring violin, flute and harpsichord, the Concerto, BWV 1044, for the same soloists, and two concertos for three harpsichords and string orchestra.

Georg Philipp Telemann wrote 17 concertos for three instruments, many of them for two identical woodwind instruments, such as flutes or oboes, with a different third instrument such as violin or bassoon, others for three identical instruments, such as three violins, and for three different instruments, such as flute, violin and cello, published for example in his Tafelmusik collection.

=== Baroque Era ===
Arcangelo Corelli's twelve concerti grossi, Op. 6, each of them for a soloist group (concertino) consisting of two violins and cello, were published posthumously in 1714. After that publication, the concerto grosso qualification was used to indicate various types of baroque concertos with multiple soloists. Antonio Vivaldi's L'estro armonico, published in 1711, also contained a number of concertos for two violins and cello, however without concertos for multiple soloists being indicated as concerto grosso in this earlier publication. The difference in Corelli's and Vivaldi's approach towards concertos for multiple soloists, as well in style as regarding the name that was used for them, has been explained as relating to differences in music traditions in Rome (where Corelli lived) and Venice (where Vivaldi lived). This did not prevent that later music historians would often, retro-actively, describe Vivaldi's concertos for multiple instruments as concerti grossi. Whatever the naming and style differences, both Corelli and Vivaldi set two violins and a cello as the standard group of soloists for triple concertos of the first quarter of the 18th century.

Johann Sebastian Bach knew Italian concertos primarily through the Venetian composers, and thus also did not use the concerto grosso qualifier for his concertos for multiple soloists. Nonetheless also his concertos for multiple instruments were retro-actively called concerti grossi. Philipp Spitta, Bach's 19th-century biographer, qualified these extant concertos for three soloists as concerti grossi:

First movement of Bach's Brandenburg Concerto No. 5, BWV 1050

- Fifth Brandenburg Concerto, BWV 1050 (solo parts for violin, flute, harpsichord).
- Fourth Brandenburg Concerto, BWV 1049 (solo parts for violin and two recorders).
- Harpsichord concerto BWV 1057, arranged after BWV 1049, with the solo violin part replaced by harpsichord.
- Triple Concerto, BWV 1044, for the same soloists as the fifth Brandenburg Concerto.
- Two concertos for three harpsichords and string orchestra:
  - No. 1 in D minor (BWV 1063), and,
  - No. 2 in C major (BWV 1064).

Section 53 of the Telemann-Werke-Verzeichnis (TWV) lists 17 concertos for three soloists and orchestra by Georg Philipp Telemann. Most of these concertos are for two identical woodwind instruments, such as flutes or oboes, with a different third instrument such as violin or bassoon. Telemann also wrote triple concertos for three identical instruments and for three different instruments: for instance, his Tafelmusik collections contain a concerto for three violins (TWV 53:F1), and one for flute, violin and cello (TWV 53:A2).

=== Classical and early Romantic Eras ===
The most popular triple concerto, commonly called Triple Concerto (Tripelkonzert), is Beethoven's Triple Concerto for violin, cello and piano. Mozart also wrote a Triple Concerto in 1776, for three pianos instead of different instruments.

=== Later developments ===
The genre was largely dormant during the romantic era; however, the twentieth century brought a revival of the concerto grosso genre, including numbers of concerti for three solo instruments.

== Triple concerto compositions ==
Examples of triple concertos include Johann Sebastian Bach's Triple Concerto, BWV 1044, with solo parts for violin, flute and harpsichord, Wolfgang Amadeus Mozart's Concerto No. 7 for three pianos, Ludwig van Beethoven's Triple Concerto for violin, cello and piano, and Dmitri Smirnov's Triple Concerto No. 2 for violin, harp and double bass.

In the following table, the compositions are initially sorted by year of composition or publication, followed by composer, title, the three instruments, the kind of orchestra, and notes, such as a link to a reference.

Triple Concertos
Year	Composer	Title	Key	Solo 1	Solo 2	Solo 3	Orchestra	Notes
1721	Johann Sebastian Bach	Brandenburg Concerto No. 4	G major	harpsichord	violin	flauto traverso	strings	
1721	Johann Sebastian Bach	Brandenburg Concerto No. 5	D major	violin	recorder	recorder	strings and bc	
1730's	Johann Sebastian Bach	Triple Concerto, BWV 1044	A minor	violin	flute	harpsichord	strings	
1730's	Johann Sebastian Bach	Concerto for three harpsichords, BWV 1063	D minor	harpsichord	harpsichord	harpsichord	strings	
1730's	Johann Sebastian Bach	Concerto for three harpsichords, BWV 1064	C major	harpsichord	harpsichord	harpsichord	strings	
1770	Antonio Salieri	Concerto for Oboe, Violin and Cello	D major	oboe	violin	cello	orchestra	
1776	Wolfgang Amadeus Mozart	Piano Concerto No. 7	F major	piano	piano	piano	orchestra	
1804	Ludwig van Beethoven	Triple Concerto	C major	violin	cello	piano	orchestra	
1825	Jan Václav Voříšek	Grand Rondeau concertant, Op.25		violin	cello	piano	orchestra	
1933	Bohuslav Martinů	Concertino		violin	cello	piano	string orchestra	
1938	Gian Francesco Malipiero	Concerto a tre		violin	cello	piano	orchestra	
1977	Dmitri Smirnov	Triple Concerto No. 1		saxophone	piano	double bass	orchestra	
2002	Lera Auerbach	Serenade for a Melancholic Sea		violin	cello	piano	orchestra	
2003	Dmitri Smirnov	Triple Concerto No. 2		violin	harp	double bass	orchestra	
2016	Wolfgang Rihm	Trio Concerto		violin	cello	piano	orchestra	
2017	Sofia Gubaidulina	Triple Concerto		violin	cello	bayan	orchestra	
