= Meshchaninov =

Meshchaninov (Russian: Мещанинов), or female form Meshchaninova (Russian: Мещанинова) is a surname of Slavic-language origin. Notable people with this surname include:

- Artyom Meshchaninov (born 1996), Russian footballer
- Ivan Meshchaninov (1883 - 1996), Soviet linguist and ethnographer
- Nataliya Meshchaninova (born 1982), Russian film director, screenwriter, and author
- Pyotr Meshchaninov (1944 - 2006), Russian pianist and conductor
