= Khrennikov's Seven =

Khrennikov's Seven (Russian: Хренниковская семёрка or Семёрка Хренникова) was a group of seven Russian Soviet composers denounced in 1979 at the Sixth Congress of the Composers' Union by its leader Tikhon Khrennikov for the unapproved participation in some festivals of Soviet music in the West. Khrennikov called their music "pointlessness ... and noisy mud instead of real musical innovation". The seven were listed in the following order: Elena Firsova, Dmitri Smirnov, Alexander Knaifel, Viktor Suslin, Vyacheslav Artyomov, Sofia Gubaidulina, and Edison Denisov. These composers subsequently suffered restrictions on the performance and publication of their music.

The tone of the denunciation harkened back to the First Congress of 1948, at which Prokofiev, Shostakovich, Khachaturian, Myaskovsky, Klebanov, and others were denounced.

By 1991, four of the seven had left the Soviet Union (Knaifel, Denisov, and Artyomov remained); Denisov left the country in 1994 and died in Paris two years later.

== Quotations ==
"In 1979, the Communist Party tried to bring these rebels [a group of younger composers known as "unofficial" composers] to heel. The egregious hack Tikhon Khrennikov, head of the Soviet Composers' Union, attacked seven of them by name in terms that were an unintended compliment: he called their music 'not representative of the work of Soviet composers'." (Gerard McBurney)

"The 'bad days' returned in November 1979, when at the Sixth Congress of the Composer's Union, the music of the so-called 'Khrennikov Seven' was criticised as 'pointlessness ... and noisy mud instead of real musical innovation' ... This victimisation came in connection with their participation in the Cologne festival. An administrative punishment was made, preventing them from being performed on the radio and television, and prohibiting the publication of their scores. The leaders of the Composer's Union also proclaimed the policy of 'divide and rule', and Schnittke, who previously had been harshly criticised, was suddenly given official recognition." (Dmitri Smirnov: Song from Underground 1)

== See also ==
- Zhdanov doctrine
- Union of Soviet Composers
- ACM - Association for Contemporary Music

== Notes ==
- The authors of the Khrennikov's address-denunciation were L. G. Grigoriev (Ginsburg) and Y. M. Platek, who became known later for their common work on Khrennikov under the title "He was chosen by Time". Khrennikov's address can be compared to Lysenko's address on genetics in 1936. "Time" which has chosen Him in 1948 stopped for 40 years.
