= Kneifel =

Kneifel is a surname. Notable people with the surname include:

- Chris Kneifel (born 1961), American racing driver
- Gottfried Kneifel (born 1948), Austrian politician
- Hans Kneifel (1936–2012), German author
- Josef Kneifel (born 1942), German political prisoner

== See also ==
- Alexander Knaifel (born 1943), Russian composer
