= Vyacheslav Artyomov =

Russian and Soviet composer (born 1940)

- Вячесла́в Петро́вич Артё́мов
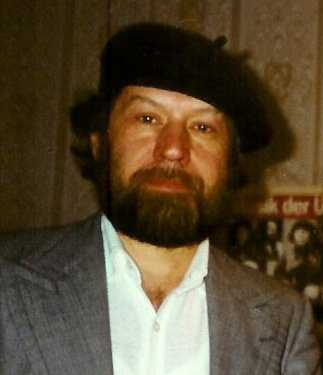
- Born: June 29, 1940 (age 86); Moscow, Russian SFSR
- Education: Moscow Conservatory
- Occupation: Composer

Vyacheslav Petrovich Artyomov (Russian: Вячесла́в Петро́вич Артё́мов; born 29 June 1940) is a Russian composer.

== Early life and education ==
Vyacheslav Artyomov was born on 29 June 1940 in Moscow, Soviet Union.

He initially pursued studies in physics while also receiving formal musical training. He attended the musical college affiliated with the Moscow Conservatory, where he studied composition with Nikolai Sidelnikov and piano with Tovi Logovinsky. Artyomov became a member of the Union of Soviet Composers and the Association for Contemporary Music (ACM). He also worked as an editor at the Moscow publishing house Musyka and graduated in 1968.

== Career ==
In 1975, he joined the improvisation group "Astreya" alongside the composers Sofia Gubaidulina and Viktor Suslin. In 1979, he was blacklisted as one of Khrennikov's Seven at the Sixth Congress for unapproved participation in several Soviet music festivals in the Western world.

His music has been performed by conductors and musicians including Rostropovich, Rozhdestvensky, Fedoseyev, Spivakov, Pletnyov, Currentzis, Virko Baley, Bunin, Kopachevsky, Isakadze, Grindenko, Yo-Yo Ma, Rudin, Yanchenko, and Ashkenazy.

He has participated in European musical performances since the 1970s, including the Festival of the Premiers (Moscow, 1994) and the Artyomov Festival (Amsterdam, 1997).

=== Musical style and themes ===
Artyomov's compositions reflect his interest in archaic ("Incantations", "Totem") and Christian ("Requiem", "Ave Maria"), as well as Eastern meditation ("Awakening", "A Symphony of Elegies", "Moonlight Dreams"). As a young composer, he developed an interest in Russian folklore, traditional music of the East, works of Prokofiev, Stravinsky, Messiaen, and the Polish avant-garde. Works such as Arthur Honegger's Symphonie Liturgique, Luciano Berio's Sinfonia, and those of Edgard Varèse made an impression on him.

Artyomov considers music and astrophysics to be the two fundamental sciences, suggesting that astrophysics broadens our knowledge of the universe, while music reveals the depth, exposes, the strength of the human spirit, and its connection to the soul of the world. He believes music is "a mediator between God and man" and "a concentrate of spiritual energy, which should awaken man's ethical understanding and purify his soul" (Foundation of the Philosophy of Music).

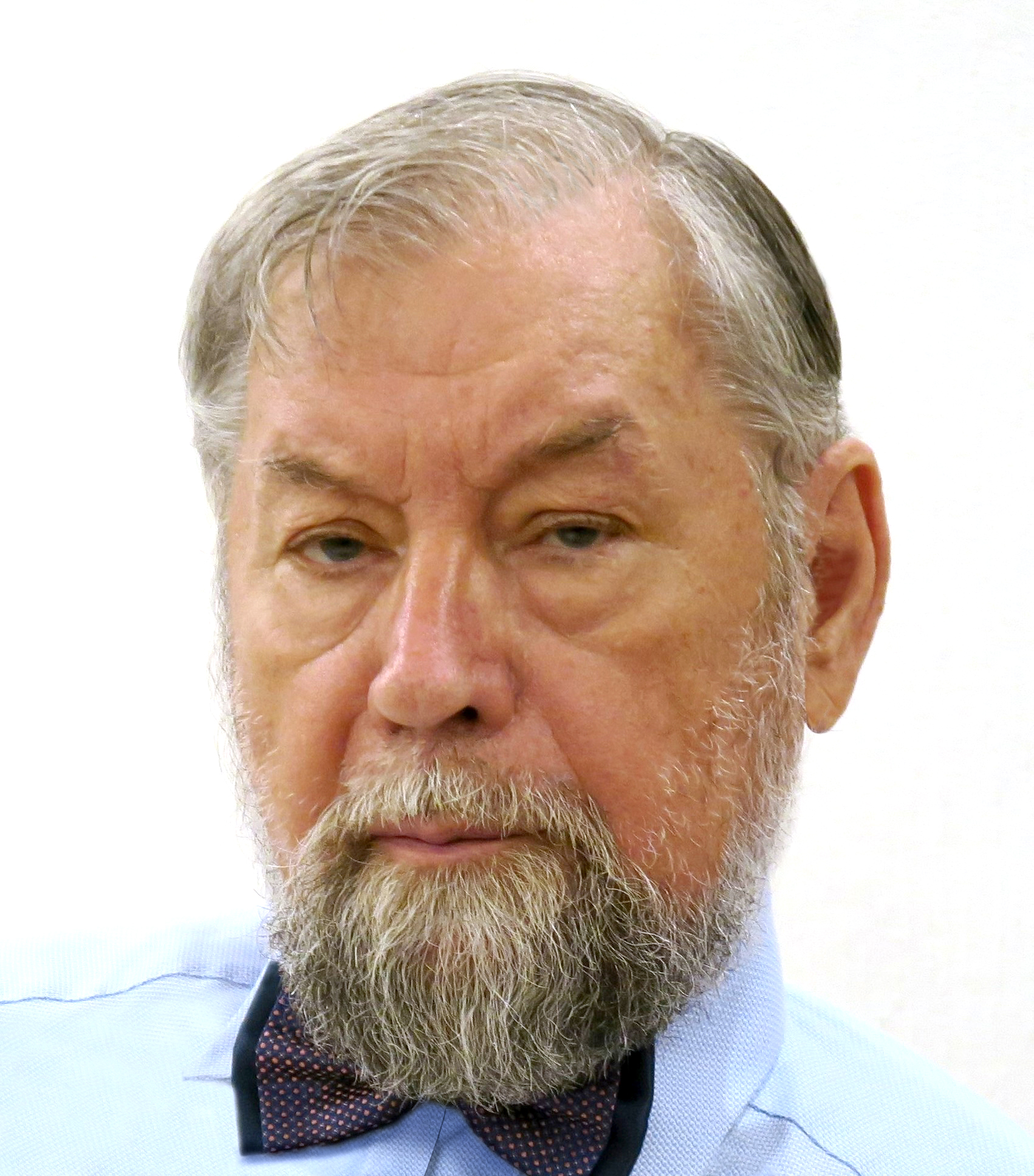
Vyacheslav Artyomov, March 2019

Artyomov is a full member of the Russian Academy of Natural Sciences, and president of the Foundation for Spiritual Creation.

== Recognition ==
Artyomov's works were nominated for the State Prizes in Russia, and he is a recipient of the Order of Friendship (2010).

Stephen A. Whealton wrote that "In the age of minimalism and abstraction, Artyomov stands apart– his music is created to serve a greater purpose, much in the same way as the later works of Scriabin and the music of Messiaen." (Way to Olympus CD by Mobile Fidelity, 1989).

A series of ten CDs with recordings of works by Artyomov was released by Divine Art to mark the composer's 80th anniversary. This series has been reviewed in Gramophone, American Record Guide, Pizzicato, Musical Opinion, Fanfare, and The Classical Reviewer. Rostropovich, who commissioned and performed three of Artyomov's symphonies, stated that Artyomov "brings glory to our country and Russian art."

== Works ==
=== Symphony of the Way (tetralogy) ===
- Way to Olympus, a symphony (1978, rev. 1984)
- On the Threshold of a Bright World, a symphony (1990, rev. 2002, 2013)
- Gentle Emanation, a symphony (1991, rev. 2008)
- The Morning Star Arises, a symphony (1993)
- Source: The New Grove Dictionary of Music and Musicians

=== The Star of Exodus (trilogy) ===
- In Memoriam, a symphony with violin solo (1968, 1984)
- In Spe, a symphony with violin and cello solos (1995–2014)
- In Gloriam, a symphony with two piano solos, choir and soloists (2020)
- Requiem (1985 – 1988)
- Gurian Hymn (1986)
- A Symphony of Elegies (1977)
- A Garland of Recitations, (1975 – 1981)
- Tristia I (1983)
- Pietà (1992, 1996)
- Tristia II (1997, 1998, rev. 2011)
- Source: The New Grove Dictionary of Music and Musicians

=== Latin Hymns ===
- Miserere mei (2003)
- Ave Maria (1989)
- Salve Regina (2003)
- Ave Maris Stella (2003)
- Variations: Nestling Antsali (1974)
- Scenes (1971)
- Capriccio on the ’75 New Year's Eve (1975)
- Totem (1976)
- Star Wind (1981)
- Hymns of Sudden Wafts (1983)
- Incantations (1981)
- Moonlight Dreams (1982)
- Maltese Hymn Ave, Crux Alba (1994, 2012)

== Discography ==
- CDBMR011129 – Vyacheslav Artyomov: Requiem Moscow Philharmonic Symphony Orchestra – Boheme
- CDBMR002124 – Vyacheslav Artyomov: – Ave – Boheme
- CDBMR010127 – Vyacheslav Artyomov: Awakening, Concert of the 13, Morning Songs & A Garland of Recitations – Boheme
- OCD514 – Vyacheslav Artyomov: Invocations Lydia Davydova/Mark Pekarsky/Percussion Ensemble – Olympia
- OCD516 – Vyacheslav Artyomov: Way Various – Olympia
- OCD 515 – Vyacheslav Artyomov: Elegies – Olympia
- MFCD 903 – Vyacheslav Artyomov: Gurian Hymn, Incantation, Way to Olympus – Mobile Fidelity
- MFCD 918 – Vyacheslav Artyomov: Songs, Hymns and Dreams – Mobile Fidelity
- 74321 56261 2 – Vyacheslav Artyomov: Lamentations, Gurian Hymn, Tristia I, Way to Olympus – BMG
- SLR0027 – Astreya (Artyomov, Gubaidulina, Suslin)- Solyd Records
- dda 25143 — Vyacheslav Artyomov: Gentle Emanation, Tristia II — T.Currentzis, V.Ponkin, Ph.Kopachevsky, RNO — Divine Art
- dda 25144 — Vyacheslav Artyomov: On the Threshold of a Bright World, Ave atque vale, Ave, crux alba — V.Ashkenazy, R. Sharayevsky, NFOR — Divine Art
- dda 25164 – Vyacheslav Artyomov: Sola Fide-suites 3 & 4, Tempo Costante – D.Kitayenko, M.Annamamedov, Academic SO of MSF, MCO Musica Viva, Kaunas SC – Divine Art
- dda 25171 – Vyacheslav Artyomov: Way to Olympus, Gurian Hymn, Preludes to Sonnets, Concert of the 13 – T.Minbayev, D.Kitayenko, G.Rozhdestvensky, A.Batagov, Y.Smirnov, T.Grindenko, Y.Adjemova, P.Meschaninov, USSR State SO, Academic SO of MSF – Divine Art
- dda 25172 – Vyacheslav Artyomov: A Symphony of Elegies, Awakening, Incantations – S.Sondeckis, T.Grindenko, O.Krysa, L.Davydova, M.Pekarsky Percussion Ensemble, Lithuanian CO – Divine Art
- dda 25173 – Vyacheslav Artyomov: Requiem – Soloists, Sveshnikov Boys' Chorus, Victor Popov, Kaunas State Chorus, Piatris Bingialis, Moscow Philharmonic Symphony Orchestra, Dmitri Kitaenko – Divine Art
- dda 25174 Vyacheslav Artyomov: A Sonata of Meditations, A Garland of Recitations, Totem – Virko Baley, M. Pekarsky Percussion Ensemble, Academic SO of MSF – Divine Art
- dda 25175 Vyacheslav Artyomov: In Memoriam, Lamentations, Pietà, Tristia I – D. Kitayenko, T. Mynbayev, M. Annamamedov, O. Krysa, A. Rudin, S. Bunin, O. Yanchenko, Academic SO of MSF, USSR State SO, CO Musica Viva – Divine Art
- dda 25176 Vyacheslav Artyomov: Star Wind, Variations: Nestling Antsali, Moonlight Dreams, Romantic Capriccio, Mattinate (Morning Songs), Scenes – M.Annamamedov, N.Lee, A.Korneyev, V.Artyomov, Chamber Ensembles – Divine Art
- dda 25184 Vyacheslav Artyomov: In Spe, Latin Hymns – V.Uriupin, I.Pochekin, A.Buzlov, N.Pavlova, RNO, Yurlov Capella – Divine Art

=== Last recordings ===
- Vyacheslav Artyomov: Gentle Emanation, Tristia II RNO, T.Currentzis, V.Pon'kin, Ph.Kopachevsky – by FSC (2010)
- Vyacheslav Artyomov: On the Threshold of a Bright World, Ave Atque Vale, Ave, Crux Alba NFOR, V. Ashkenazy, R. Sharayevsky – by FSC (2013)
- Vyacheslav Artyomov: In Spe, Latin Hymns – I. Pochekin, A. Buzlov, N. Pavlova, Yurlov Coral Capella, RNO, V. Uriupin – by FSC (2018)

== Bibliography ==
- Artëmov, Vjačeslav; V. Mud'jugina (2004): Vjačeslav Artëmov. Muzyka, Moskau. ISBN 5-7140-0177-X. [Booklet, Russian and English]
- McBurney, Gerard (1992). "Vyacheslav Artyomov". In Morton, Brian; Collins, Pamela (eds.). Contemporary Composers. Chicago: St. James Press. pp. 33-34. ISBN 1-55862-085-0.
