= Viktor Suslin =

Russian composer

Viktor Yevseyevich Suslin
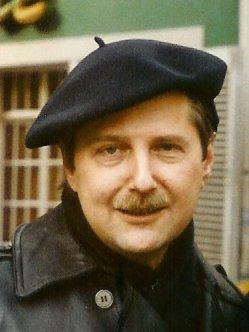
- Viktor Suslin in 1989
- Born: 13 June 1942; Kharkiv, Soviet Union
- Died: 10 July 2012 (aged 70)
- Citizenship: Soviet Union, German
- Education: Kharkiv Music High School (1950–1961); Kharkiv Conservatory (1961–1962); Gnessin Institute, Moscow (1962–1966)
- Occupation: Composer
- Known for: Founding member of Astraea ensemble, contemporary classical composition

Viktor Yevseyevich Suslin (Russian: Ви́ктор Евсе́евич Су́слин; 13 June 1942 – 10 July 2012) was a Russian composer. An associate of Sofia Gubaidulina's, together with her and Vyacheslav Artyomov he formed the improvisatory ensemble 'Astraea' in 1975. He emigrated to Germany in 1981.

== Biography ==
At the age of four (1946) Suslin began to study piano and made his first attempts at composition. From 1950 to 1961 he attended Kharkiv Music High School, and from 1961 to 1962 the Kharkiv Conservatory where he studied composition with Dimitri Klebanov and piano with V. Topilin. From 1962 to 1966 he studied composition with Nikolay Peyko and piano with Anatoly Vedernikov at the Gnessin Institute in Moscow.

He worked as an editor at the publishing house Muzyka in Moscow (1966–1980). Suslin became a member of the Union of Soviet Composers in 1967. In 1969 his piano sonata was given an award at the Young Composers Competition. In 1971 his music was performed outside of Russia for the first time at the Festival de Royan, France.

Suslin taught instrumentation at the Moscow Conservatory (1972–1975). In 1975 he founded the ‘Astraea’ improvisation ensemble together with Vyacheslav Artyomov and Sofia Gubaidulina.

In November 1979 after several performances of his works in Paris, Cologne and Venice, Suslin was publicly denounced and blacklisted as one of the "Khrennikov's Seven" at the Sixth Congress of the Union of Soviet Composers for unapproved participation in some festivals of Soviet music in the West.

Suslin emigrated to West Germany in 1981. From 1984 he worked as an editor at Musikverlag Hans Sikorski, Hamburg. From 2007 Suslin was director (Geschäftsführer) of Musikverlag M. P. Belaieff.

Suslin was good friends with Galina Ustvolskaya toward the end of her life, exchanging letters with her and facilitating an interview with Thea Derks. Sikorski ostensibly began to publish Ustvolskaya's works while Suslin was an editor there.

== Works ==
- Music for Children for piano (1961)
- Violin Sonata (1962)
- String Quartet (1963)
- Japanese Songs for baritone and piano (1964)
- Five pieces for piano (1965)
- Poem for orchestra (1966)
- Piano concerto (1966)
- Piano Sonata (1968)
- Violin Concerto (1969)
- Sinfonia piccolo for orchestra (1970)
- Trio-Sonata for flute, guitar and cello (1971)
- Three Choruses after Daniil Kharms (1972)
- Gioco Appassionato for 4 violas (1974)
- Patience for 2 pianos (1974)
- Mitternachtsmusik (Midnight Music) for volin, harpsichords and double bass (1977)
- Poco a poco II, Organ Sonata No.1 (1978)
- Terrarium for percussion ensemble (1978)
- Leb’ wohl for orchestra (1982)
- In My End is My Beginning, Organ Sonata No.2 (1983)
- Sonata per violoncello e percussione (1983)
- Chanson contre raison, Sonata for solo cello (1984)
- Sonata Capricciosa for viola and harpsichord (1986)
- Lamento for Organ (1989)
- Crossing Beyond for viola, cello and double bass (1990)
- Le deuil blanc (White Mourning) for bass flute, guitar, cello and percussions (1994)
- Cello Concerto (1996)
- Two Pieces for piano (1996)
- Hommage à "Hortus" by a Musicus for an ensemble of Renaissance instruments (1996)
- Morgendämmerungsmusik (Morning Twilight Music) for double bass (1997)
- Madrigal for two cellos (1998)
- Ton H for cello and piano (2001)
- Raga for double bass and organ (2006)
