= In Memoriam to the Martyrs of Babi Yar =

1945 symphony by Dmitri Klebanov

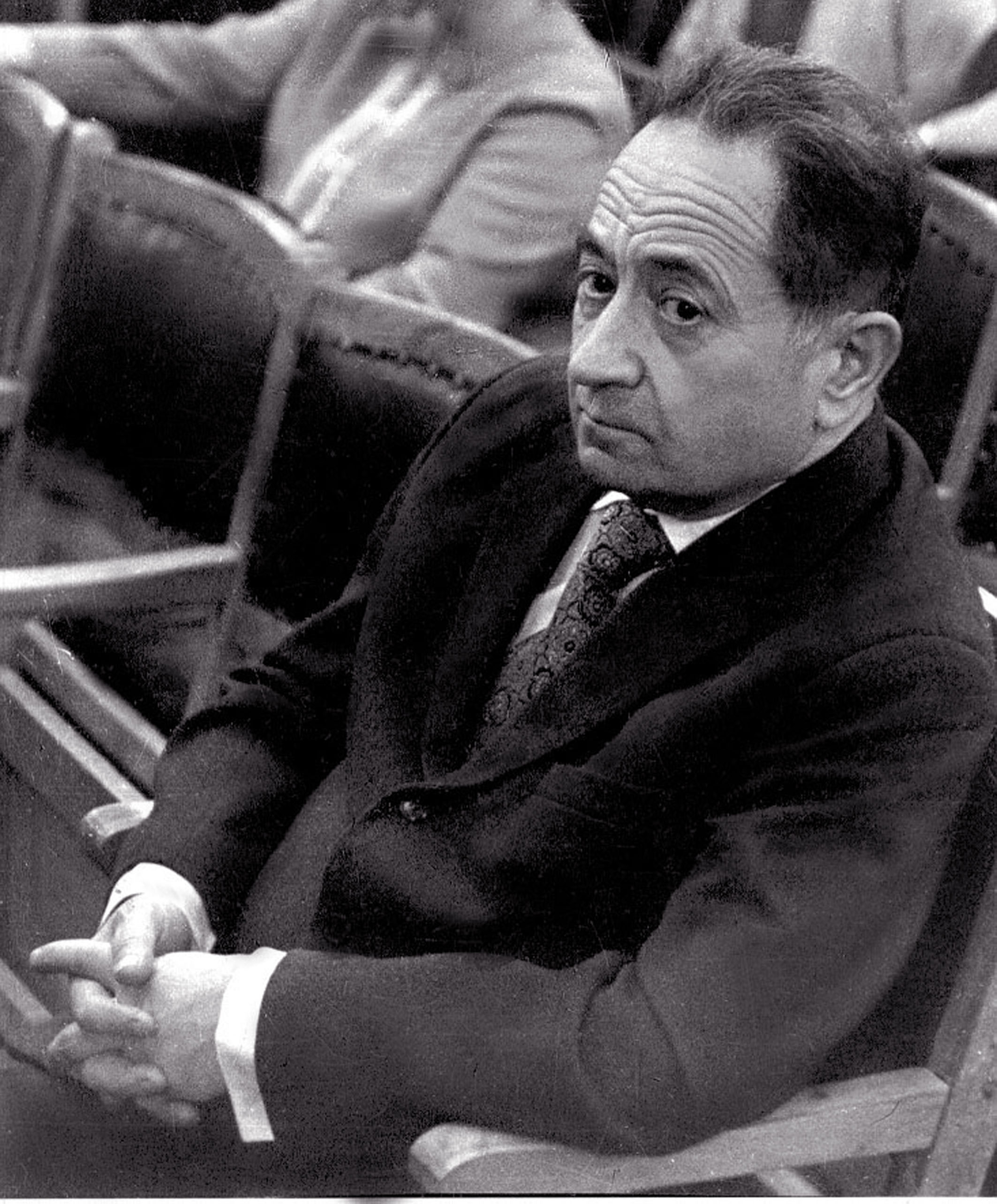
Dmitri Klebanov

The Symphony No. 1, titled In Memoriam to the Martyrs of Babi Yar, is a Ukrainian symphony composed by Dmitri Klebanov in 1945. It is a commemoration of the massacre of the Jews in Babi Yar, Ukraine, during the Holocaust.

== History ==
Of Jewish descent, Klebanov based his symphony was based on Jewish traditional tunes. In particular, its finale was a variation of "The Mourner's Kaddish" prayer. The symphony was quickly forbidden (as part of the Soviet regime's effort to stop Jewish commemoration activities) and the composer was stripped of the position of Chairman of the Kharkiv chapter of the Union of Soviet Composers. Klebanov was accused of "distortion of historical truth about the Soviet people" (the official Soviet party line was that those perished during the war were all Soviet people, and singling out particular ethnicities was forbidden), "bourgeois formalism" and "cosmopolitanism" and there were even efforts to accuse him of anti-Soviet activities.

The symphony received its premiere in the late 1980s, with the National Symphony Orchestra of Ukraine conducted by Ihor Blazhkov. Later research uncovered Klebanov's original manuscript of the symphony, from which Oleksandr Shchetynskyi prepared a revised edition of the score. This revised edition received a performance in September 2024 with the National Symphony Orchestra of Ukraine. In November 2025, the Modesto Symphony Orchestra performed the United States premiere, in California.

== See also ==
- Symphony No. 13 (Shostakovich), subtitled "Babi Yar"
