= The Canterville Ghost (Knaifel opera) =

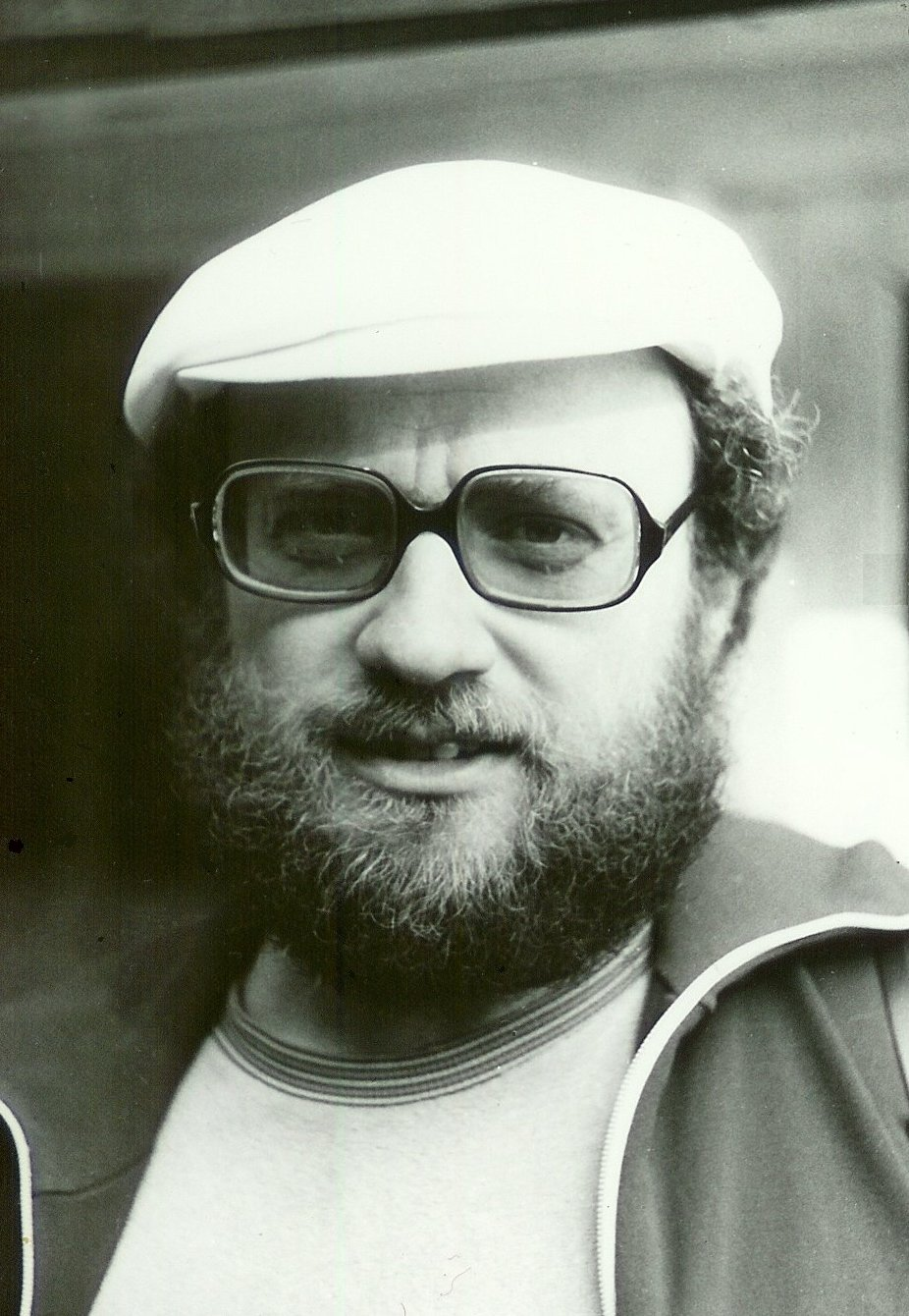
Alexander Knaifel, 1982

The Canterville Ghost (also The Ghost of Canterville, Russian: Кентервильское привидение, romanized: Kentervíl’skoye prividénie) is an opera by the Russian composer Alexander Knaifel in three acts for 18 singers and chamber orchestra, also in an abridged version for two soloists and chamber orchestra.

The opera was composed in 1965–66 to the libretto by Tatiana Kramarova after the 1887 short story "The Canterville Ghost" by Oscar Wilde. Text Russian (translated into English by V. Paperno). It is dedicated to the composer Rein Laul.

Also: Romantic Scenes from the Opera – in seven scenes with prologue for basso profondo and light soprano with chamber orchestra (shorter version). Duration: 90 minutes.

== Cast, orchestra ==
Shorter version:

- Solo voices: bass, soprano
- Orchestra: flute, oboe, 2 clarinets (piccolo and bass), contrabassoon, horn, trumpet, trombone, tuba, timpani, 4 percussion (tubular bells, glockenspiel, xylophone, flexatone), piano/celesta, organ (may be on tape), 5 strings (1.1.1.1.1).

The score is published by Sovetsky Kompozitor, Leningrad 1977.

Full version:

- Singers: 6 sopranos, 2 boy sopranos, 4 mezzo-sopranos, alto, 2 tenors, 2 baritones, bass
- Orchestra: flute, oboe, 2 clarinets (piccolo and bass), contrabassoon, horn, trumpet, trombone, tuba, timpani, percussion (5 players, instruments include tubular bells, glockenspiel, xylophone and flexatone), piano/celesta, organ (may be on tape), 2 violins, viola, cello, double bass.

== Performance history ==
It was first performed on February 26, 1974, (with the subsequent performances on November 30, and December 15, 1974) in Leningrad, the House of Composers by the Chamber Orchestra of Conservatoire, conducted by L. Gelgrud.

It was performed on March 3 and 4, 1980, in London by the BBC Symphony Orchestra, conducted by Gennady Rozhdestvensky.

== Recordings ==
- The Canterville Ghost - Operatic scenes inspired by Oscar Wilde (shorter version, 50 minutes) Recorded 1990. The Moscow Theater "Forum" Orchestra, Stanislav Suleymanov (bass), Tatiana Monogarova (soprano), Alexander Levental (organ), conductor Michail Jurowski. Issued on CD: Harmonia Mundi Saison Russe / Le Chant du monde 1991; reissued Brilliant Classics 2012.
