= The Canticle of the Sun (Gubaidulina) =

The Canticle of the Sun (Sonnengesang) is a composition by Russian composer Sofia Gubaidulina written in 1997 and published by Hans Sikorski, it is based on the "Canticle of the Sun" by Saint Francis of Assisi and is dedicated to Mstislav Rostropovich for his seventieth birthday. Though the piece features a soloist and an ensemble, Gubaidulina did not consider it a cello concerto.

== Analysis ==
Sofia Gubaidulina gives the following outline of the formal sections:

1. Glorification of the Creator, and His Creations - the Sun and the Moon
2. Glorification of the Creator, the Maker of the four elements: air, water, fire and earth
3. Glorification of life
4. Glorification of death

Though, she notes that the cellist's 'abandonment' of their instrument actually divides the piece in two.

The piece is written for cello, choir, and percussion. An overtone row played on the C string is used, after which the cellist tunes the string down to the lowest note possible on the instrument, bows near the bridge, on the bridge with a snare drum stick, behind the bridge, and then on the tailpiece. The cellist then puts down the instrument, playing on a bass drum, and then on a flexatone with a bass bow before returning to the cello.

== Recordings ==
The piece was completed in 1997, and was premiered the year after on 2nd September 1998 in Frankfurt, Germany by Mstislav Rostropovich, the State Choir of Kaunas and the Lithuanian National Symphony Orchestra.

Other recordings include:

- the UK Premiere of the piece, it was recorded in 1999 (released 2001) and it involved Rostroprovich (Cellist), London Voices (Choir), Ryusuke Numajiri (Conductor), and the London Symphony Orchestra. The recording also included another piece of Gubaidulina title Music for Flute, Strings, and Percussion (1994), where Emmanuel Pahud was the flautist.
- Channel Classics CCS SA 20904 (Release date January 2004), Pieter Wispelwey (Cellist), Collegium Vocale Gent (Choir), Daniel Reuss (Conductor).
- ECM 2256/ECM 4764662, (rec. 2010, rel. 2012) Gidon Kremer (Violinist and Director), Nicolas Altstaedt (Cellist), Kamēr... (Choir), Māris Sirmais (Conductor). (Also included Gubaidulina's Lyre of Orpheus; was dedicated to the composer's 80th birthday)
