= Alexander Knaifel =

Soviet composer (1943–2024)

- Александр Кнайфель
- Knaifel in 1982
- Born: 28 November 1943; Tashkent, Uzbek Soviet Socialist Republic
- Died: 27 June 2024 (aged 80); Berlin, Germany
- Occupation: Composer

Alexander Knaifel (Russian: Алекса́ндр Аро́нович Кна́йфель; also Alexandr Knaifel; 28 November 1943, Tashkent – 27 June 2024, Berlin) was a Soviet and Russian composer, often described as one of the most prominent Russian composers of his generation. His work spans early experimental compositions associated with Soviet avantgarde and later turns towards a contemplative, spiritually oriented aesthetic influenced by Orthodox Christianity. Knaifel’s music is characterized by a distinctive use of silence, sparse musical material, and unconventional approaches to text and sound.

Knaifel was born in Tashkent to a family of Leningrad musicians evacuated there during the Second World War. His family soon returned to Leningrad (Saint Petersburg), which remained his lifelong home. Before turning to composition, he studied with Mstislav Rostropovich as a cellist, maintaining a close artistic relationship with him throughout his life.

His experimental work in the 1970s drew criticism from Soviet cultural authorities, and he was associated with the Khrennikov's Seven. From the 1980s, his works were increasingly performed internationally. Knaifel composed in a wide range of genres, including opera, orchestral, choral and chamber music, as well as music for more than forty films. Recordings of his works, particularly those released by ECM Records, contributed to his international recognition.

== Background ==
Knaifel was born on 28 November 1943. He studied cello with Mstislav Rostropovich at Moscow Conservatory from 1961 to 1963, then composition with Boris Arapov in Leningrad from 1964 until 1967.

Knaifel died on 27 June 2024, at the age of 80.

== Music ==
From the very beginning of his composing career he associated himself with the group of so-called "avant-garde" Soviet composers that include Andrey Volkonsky, Edison Denisov, Alfred Schnittke, Sofia Gubaidulina, Valentin Silvestrov, Leonid Hrabovsky, Arvo Pärt, Tigran Mansuryan, and others. The works of the 1990s and 2000s were strongly influenced by religious themes and showed dramatic changes in his musical language.

He wrote more than 80 compositions in various genres and also more than 40 scores for feature films and documentaries.

His music often surprises by its extravagant ideas, strange combination of the instruments or incredibly long duration. For example, his very slow and quiet Agnus Dei (1985) written for four instrumentalists (each of whom plays several instruments including keyboards, percussion, electronics, saxophones and double bass) lasts exactly 120 minutes. Another two-hour-long piece Nika (72 fragments after Heraclitus and Dante 1973–1974), is written for 17 double basses; and the piece titled Solaris (1980) is scored for 35 Javanese gongs.

In 1979 Knaifel was blacklisted as one of "Khrennikov's Seven" at the Sixth Congress of the Union of Soviet Composers for unapproved participation in some festivals of Soviet music in the West.

Norman Lebrecht explains Knaifel and his music as follows: "Russian iconoclast, writing slow, quiet and unsettling music that passes from one instrument to another when it is good and ready... Many of his scores are unperformed, perhaps unperformable."

Alexander Knaifel had a performance dedicated to his music in Ireland on 1 May 2009 as part of the Drogheda Arts Festival. The event entitled The Rest is Noise : the music of Alexander Knaifel featured the world premiere of a new work, the string trio " EF and the three calling cards of the poet".

== Selected works ==
- The Ghost of Canterville, opera in three acts with Prologue after Oscar Wilde for soloists and chamber orchestra (1965–1966)
- Medea, ballet in two parts after the Greek saga (1968)
- Monody for female voice (1968)
- The Silly Horse, 15 poems after V. Levin and F. Solasko for female singer and piano (1981) CD Megadisc MDC 7844: Tatjana Melentieva (soprano), Oleg Malov (piano)
- Agnus Dei for four instruments a cappella (1985) CD Megadisc 7808/07: Ensemble Musiques Nouvelles
- God, ode after Dershavin for chorus and children's chorus (1985)
- Litany I for orchestra (1988)
- Litany II for orchestra (1988)
- Through the Rainbow of Unvoluntary Tears for soprano and cello (1988)
- The Offer for a chorus of string instruments (1991)
- Svete Tikhiy (O Gladsome Light), song of the Most Holy Theotokos for Tatjana Melentieva (1991) CD ECM New Series 1763: Tatiana Melentieva (soprano), Andrei Siegle (sampler)
- Yet again on the Hypothesis (A Dialogue with J.S. Bach Prelude and Fugue B minor from Well Tempered Piano) for soloistic instrumental ensemble (1991–1992)
- In any Forgetting of Exhaustion, postludium to the memory of M.G. Orlovski for chamber orchestra (1992)
- Postludium for soprano and piano) CD Megadisc MDC 7855: Tatjana Melentieva (soprano), Oleg Malov (piano)
- The Jacob's Ladder, glossolalia of Thirteen for chorus (1992)
- The Eighth Chapter, canticum canticorum for choruses and cello (1993)
- In Air Clear and Unseen, stanzas with Tyutchev for piano and string quartet (1994) CD ECM New Series 1763: Keller Quartet, Oleg Malov (piano)
- Lux Aeterna for two cellos and psalm singers (1998)
- Scarry March for soprano and piano CD Megadisc MDC 7855: Tatjana Melentieva (soprano), Oleg Malov (piano)
- Prayer to the Holy Spirit for soprano and piano CD Megadisc MDC 7855: Tatjana Melentieva (soprano), Oleg Malov (piano)
- Alice in Wonderland, opera (2001)
- EF and the Three Calling Cards of the Poet, string trio: Joachim Roewer, Elizabeth Cooney and Elizabeth Wilson world premiere in Ireland (2009)
- O Heavenly King, the first recording of the version for string quartet, piano/celeste and soprano features on the Louth Contemporary Music CD A Place Between (2009)
