= Symphony No. 13 (Shostakovich) =

1962 symphony by Dmitri Shostakovich

- Babi Yar
- by Dmitri Shostakovich
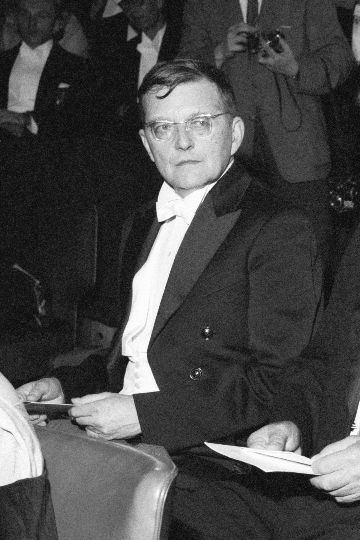
- Dmitri Shostakovich in 1958
- Key: B♭ minor
- Opus: 113
- Text: Yevgeny Yevtushenko
- Language: Russian
- Composed: 1962
- Duration: 1 hour
- Movements: 5
- Scoring: Bass soloist, men's chorus, and large orchestra

Premiere
- Date: December 18, 1962
- Location: Large Hall of the Moscow Conservatory; Moscow, Russian SFSR
- Conductor: Kirill Kondrashin
- Performers: Vitaly Gromadsky (bass); Basses of the Republican Russian Chorus (Alexander Yurlov, choirmaster); Moscow Philharmonic Orchestra

The Symphony No. 13 in B♭ minor, Op. 113 for bass soloist, bass chorus, and large orchestra was composed by Dmitri Shostakovich in 1962. It consists of five movements, each a setting of a Yevgeny Yevtushenko poem that describes aspects of Soviet history and life. Although the symphony is commonly referred to by the nickname Babi Yar, no such subtitle is designated in Shostakovich's manuscript score.

The symphony was completed on July 20, 1962, and first performed in Moscow on December 18 of that year. Kirill Kondrashin conducted the premiere after Yevgeny Mravinsky declined the assignment. Vitaly Gromadsky sang the solo part alongside the basses of the Republican Russian Chorus and the Moscow Philharmonic.

== Movements ==
The symphony consists of five movements.

1. Babi Yar: Adagio (15–18 minutes)
2. Humour: Allegretto (8–9 minutes)
3. In the Store: Adagio (10–13 minutes)
4. Fears: Largo (11–13 minutes)
5. Career: Allegretto (11–13 minutes)

=== I. Babi Yar ===
In this movement, Shostakovich and Yevtushenko transform the 1941 massacre by Nazis of Jews at Babi Yar, near Kiev, into a denunciation of anti-Semitism in all its forms. (Although a monument was not erected at Babi Yar by the Soviet government, it still became a place of pilgrimage for Soviet Jews.) Shostakovich sets the poem as a series of theatrical episodes — the Dreyfus affair, the Białystok pogrom and the story of Anne Frank — extended interludes in the main theme of the poem, lending the movement the dramatic structure and theatrical imagery of opera while resorting to graphic illustration and vivid word painting. For instance, the mocking of the imprisoned Dreyfus by poking umbrellas at him through the prison bars may be in an accentuated pair of eighth notes in the brass, with the build-up of menace in the Anne Frank episode, culminating in the musical image of the breaking down of the door to the Franks' hiding place, which underlines the hunting down of that family.

This movement touches on the subject of suppression in the Soviet Union and is the most elaborate musically of the symphony's five movements, using a variety of musical ideas to stress its message, from an angry march to alternating soft and violent episodes.

=== II. Humour ===
Shostakovich quotes from the third of his Six Romances on Verses by British Poets, Op. 62 (Robert Burns' "Macpherson Before His Execution") to colour Yevtushenko's imagery of the spirit of mockery, endlessly murdered and endlessly resurrected, denouncing the vain attempts of tyrants to shackle wit. The movement is a Mahlerian gesture of mocking burlesque, not simply light or humorous but witty, satirical and parodistic.

=== III. In the Store ===
This movement is about the hardship of Soviet women queueing in a shop. This arouses Shostakovich's compassion no less than racial prejudice and gratuitous violence. Written in the form of a lament, the chorus departs from its unison line in the music's two concluding harmonized chords for the only time in the entire symphony, ending on a plagal cadence functioning much the same as a liturgical amen.

=== IV. Fears ===
This movement touches on the subject of suppression in the Soviet Union and is the most elaborate musically of the symphony's five movements, using a variety of musical ideas to stress its message, from an angry march to alternating soft and violent episodes.

Harmonic ambiguity instills a deep sense of unease as the chorus intones the first lines of the poem: "Fears are dying out in Russia" ("Умирают в России страхи"). Shostakovich breaks this mood only in response to Yevtushenko's agitprop lines, "We weren't afraid / of construction work in blizzards / or of going into battle under shell-fire" ("Не боялись мы строить в метели, / уходить под снарядами в бой"), parodying the Soviet marching song "Smelo tovarishchi v nogu" ("Bravely, comrades, march to step").

=== V. Career ===
While this movement opens with a pastoral duet by flutes over a B♭ pedal bass, giving the musical effect of sunshine after a storm, it is an ironic attack on bureaucrats, touching on cynical self-interest and robotic unanimity — and is also a tribute to genuine creativity. The soloist comes onto equal terms with the chorus, with sarcastic commentary provided by the bassoon and other wind instruments, as well as rude squeaking from the trumpets. It also relies more than the other movements on purely orchestral passages as links between vocal statements.

== Instrumentation ==
The symphony calls for a bass soloist, bass chorus and an orchestra with the following instrumentation.

Woodwinds

3 flutes (3rd doubling piccolo)
3 oboes (3rd doubling cor anglais)
3 clarinets (2nd doubling E♭, 3rd doubling bass clarinet)
3 bassoons (3rd doubling contrabassoon)

Brass

4 horns
3 trumpets
3 trombones
1 tuba

Percussion

timpani

triangle
castanets
whip
woodblocks
tambourine
snare drum
bass drum
cymbals
bells
tam-tam
glockenspiel
xylophone

Keyboards

celesta
piano

Strings

2-4 harps
1st violins
2nd violins
violas
cellos
double basses

== Overview ==
=== Background ===
Yevtushenko's poem "Babi Yar" was published in the Literaturnaya Gazeta in September 1961 and, along with the publication of Alexander Solzhenitsyn's novel One Day in the Life of Ivan Denisovich in Novy Mir, appeared during a surge of anti-Stalinist literature during the premiership of Nikita Khrushchev. Publishers began receiving more anti-Stalinist novels, short stories and memoirs. This fad soon faded.

According to Edison Denisov, Shostakovich had always loathed anti-Semitism.

=== Composition ===
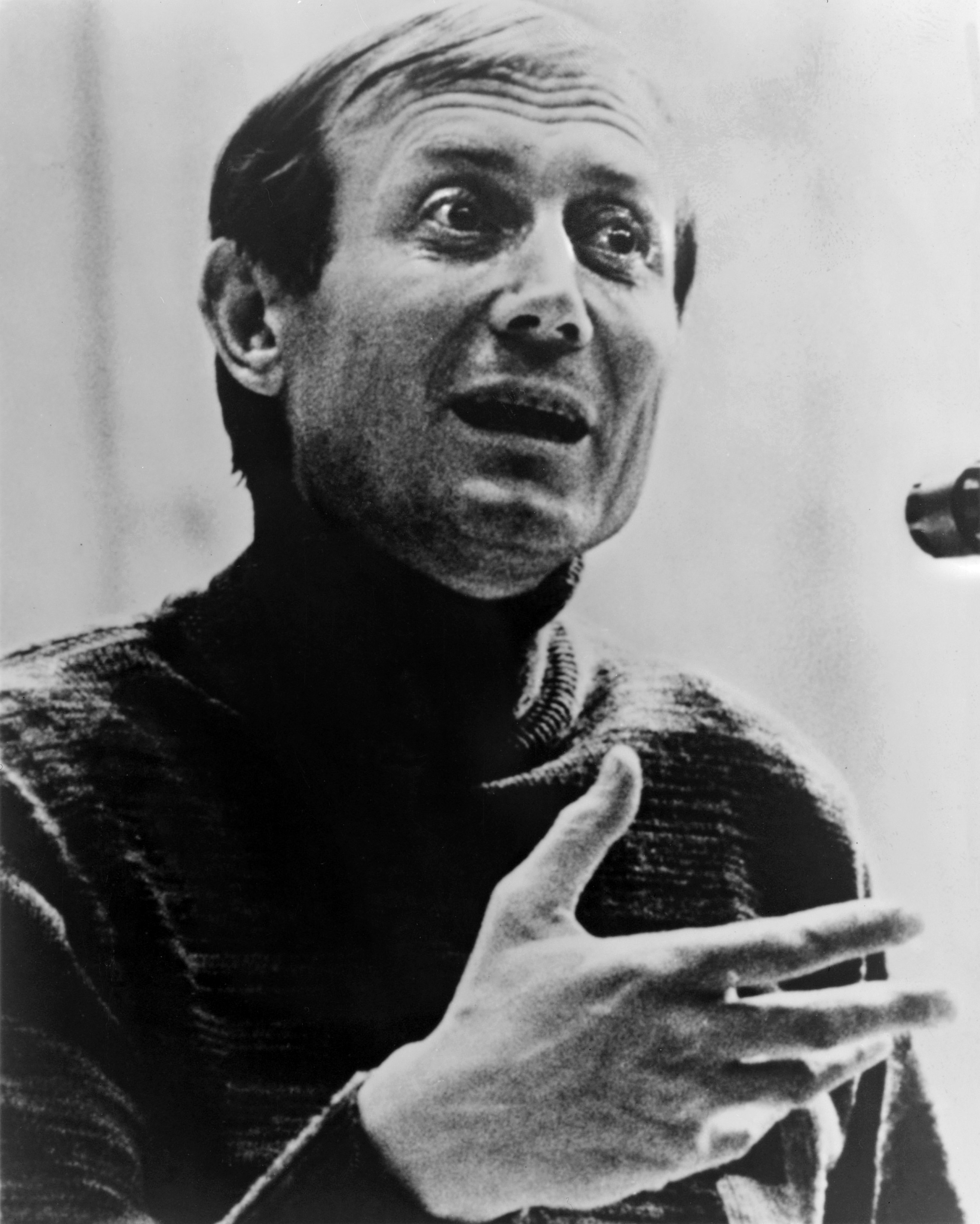
Yevgeny Yevtushenko c. 1979

The symphony was originally intended as a single-movement "vocal-symphonic poem". By the end of May, Shostakovich had found three additional poems by Yevtushenko, which caused him to expand the work into a multi-movement choral symphony by complementing Babi Yar's theme of Jewish suffering with Yevtushenko's verses about other Soviet abuses. Yevtushenko wrote the text for the fourth movement, "Fears", at the composer's request. The composer completed these four additional movements within six weeks, putting the final touches on the symphony on July 20, 1962, during a hospital stay. Discharged that day, he took the night train to Kiev to show the score to bass Boris Gmyrya, an artist he especially admired and wanted to sing the solo part in the work. From there he went to Leningrad to give the score to conductor Yevgeny Mravinsky.

Yevtushenko remembered, on hearing the composer play and sing the complete symphony for him,

… I was stunned, and first and foremost by his choice of such apparently disparate poems. It had never occurred to me that they could be united like that. In my book [The Wave of a Hand] I didn't put them next to each other. But here the jolly, youthful, anti-bureaucratic "[C]areer" and the poem "Humor," full of jaunty lines, were linked with the melancholy and graphic poem about tired Russian women queueing in a shop. Then came "Fears Are Dying in Russia." Shostakovich interpreted it in his own way, giving it a depth and insight that the poem lacked before.... In connecting all these poems like that, Shostakovich completely changed me as a poet.

Yevtushenko added, about the composer's setting of Babi Yar that "if I were able to write music I would have written it exactly the way Shostakovich did.... His music made the poem greater, more meaningful and powerful. In a word, it became a much better poem."

=== Growing controversy ===
By the time Shostakovich had completed the first movement on March 27, 1962, Yevtushenko was already being subjected to a campaign of criticism, as he was now considered a political liability. Khrushchev's agents began a campaign to discredit him, accusing the poet of placing the suffering of the Jewish people above that of the Russians. The intelligentsia called him a "boudoir poet" — in other words, a moralist. Shostakovich defended the poet in a letter dated October 26, 1965, to his pupil Boris Tishchenko:

As for what "moralising" poetry is, I didn't understand. Why, as you maintain, it isn't "among the best." Morality is the twin sister of conscience. And because Yevtushenko writes about conscience, God grant him all the very best. Every morning, instead of morning prayers, I reread - well, recite from memory - two poems from Yevtushenko, "Boots" and "A Career." "Boots" is conscience. "A Career" is morality. One should not be deprived of conscience. To lose conscience is to lose everything.

For the Party, performing critical texts at a public concert with symphonic backing had a potentially much greater impact than simply reading the same texts at home privately. It should be no surprise, then, that Khrushchev criticized the symphony before the premiere, and threatened to stop its performance,

By mid-August 1962, Gmyrya had withdrawn from the premiere under pressure from the local Party Committee; writing the composer, he claimed that, in view of the dubious text, he declined to perform the work. Mravinsky soon followed suit, though he excused himself for other than political reasons. Shostakovich then asked Kirill Kondrashin to conduct the work. Two singers were engaged, Viktor Nechipailo to sing the premiere and Vitaly Gromadsky in case a substitute were needed. Nechipailo was forced to drop out at the last minute (to cover at the Bolshoi Theatre for a singer who had been ordered to "get sick" in a performance of Verdi's Don Carlo, according to Vishnevskaya's autobiography "Galina: A Russian Story", page 278). Kondrashin was also asked to withdraw but refused. He was then pressured to drop the first movement.

=== Premiere ===
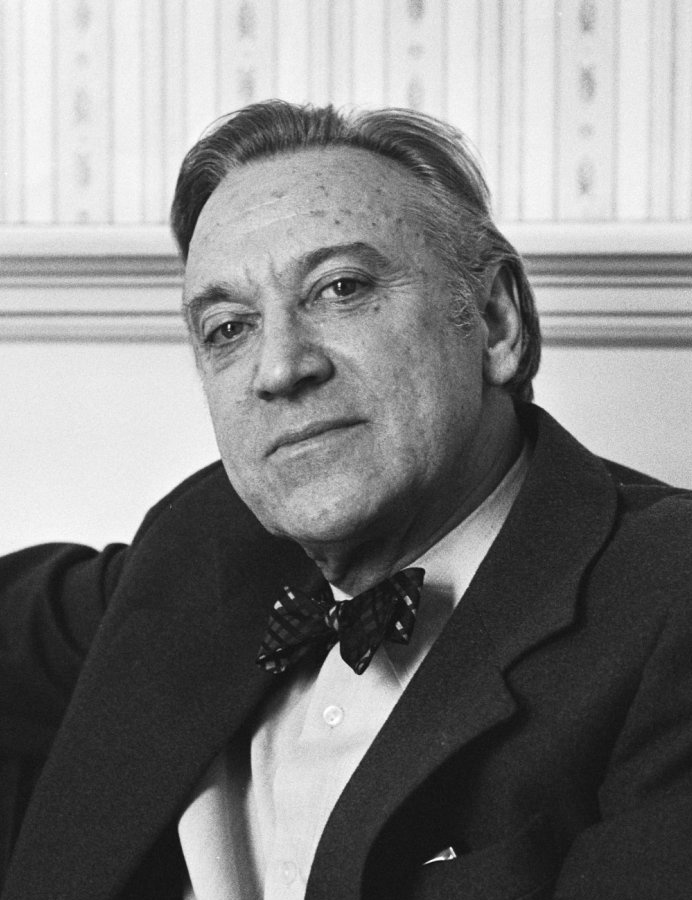
Kirill Kondrashin conducted the 1962 premiere

Official interference continued throughout the day of the concert. Cameras originally slated to televise the piece were noisily dismantled. The entire choir threatened to walk out; a desperate speech by Yevtushenko was all that kept them from doing so. The premiere finally went ahead on December 18, 1962, with the government box empty but the theatre otherwise packed. The symphony played to a tremendous ovation. Kondrashin remembered, "At the end of the first movement the audience started to applaud and shout hysterically. The atmosphere was tense enough as it was, and I waved at them to calm down. We started playing the second movement at once, so as not to put Shostakovich into an awkward position." Sculptor Ernst Neizvestny, who was present, said, "It was major! There was a sense of something incredible happening. The interesting part was that when the symphony ended, there was no applause at first, just an unusually long pause—so long that I even thought that it might be some sort of conspiracy. But then the audience burst into wild applause with shouts of 'Bravo!'"

=== Changed lines ===
Kondrashin gave two performances of the Thirteenth Symphony; a third was scheduled for January 15, 1963. However, at the beginning of 1963 Yevtushenko reportedly published a second, now politically correct version of Babi Yar twice the length of the original. The length of the new version can be explained not only by changes in content but also by a noticeable difference in writing style. It might be possible that Yevtushenko intentionally changed his style of narrative to make it clear that the modified version of the text is not something he initially intended. While Shostakovich biographer Laurel Fay maintains that such a volume has yet to surface, the fact remains that Yevtushenko wrote new lines for the eight most offensive ones questioned by the authorities.

The rest of the poem is as strongly aimed at the Soviet political authorities as those lines that were changed so the reasons for these changes were more precise. Not wanting to set the new version to music, yet knowing the original version faced little chance of performance, the composer agreed to the performance of the new version yet did not add those lines to the manuscript of the symphony.

Original Version
Мне кажется сейчас – я иудей.
Вот я бреду по древнему Египту.
А вот я, на кресте распятый, гибну,
и до сих пор на мне – следы гвоздей.
...
И сам я, как сплошной беззвучный крик,
над тысячами тысяч погребённых.
Я – каждый здесь расстрелянный старик.
Я – каждый здесь расстрелянный ребёнок.

Censored Version
Я тут стою, как будто у криницы,
дающей веру в наше братство мне.
Здесь русские лежат и украинцы,
с евреями лежат в одной земле..
...
Я думаю о подвиге России,
фашизму преградившей путь собой,
до самой наикрохотной росинки
мне близкой всею сутью и судьбой.

Original Version
I feel myself a Jew.
Here I tread across old Egypt.
Here I die, nailed to the cross.
And even now I bear the scars of it.
...
I become a gigantic, soundless scream
Above the thousands buried here.
I am every old man shot dead here.
I am every child shot dead here.

Censored Version
Here I stand at the fountainhead
That gives me faith in brotherhood.
Here Russians lie, and Ukrainians
Together with Jews in the same ground.
...
I think of Russia's heroic dead
In blocking the way to Fascism.
To the smallest dew-drop, she is close to me
In her being and her fate.

Even with these changed lines, the symphony enjoyed relatively few performances — two with the revised text in Moscow in February 1963 and one in Minsk (with the original text, conducted by Vitaly Katayev) shortly afterward, as well as performances in Gorky, Leningrad and Novosibirsk. After these performances, the work was effectively banned in the Soviet bloc, the work's premiere in East Berlin occurring only because the local censor had forgotten to clear the performance with Moscow beforehand. Meanwhile, a copy of the score with the original text was smuggled to the West by Mstislav Rostropovich, and it was premiered and recorded in January 1970 by the Philadelphia Orchestra under Eugene Ormandy.

Second to the "Babi Yar" movement, the bureaucrats most viciously attacked the "Fears" movement. To keep the symphony in performance, seven lines of the poem were altered, replacing references to imprisonment without trial, to neglect of the poor and to the fear experienced by artists.

=== Influence of Mussorgsky ===
Shostakovich's orchestration of Modest Mussorgsky's Boris Godunov, Khovanshchina and Songs and Dances of Death had an important bearing on the Thirteenth Symphony, as well as on Shostakovich's late work. Shostakovich wrote the greater part of his vocal music after his immersion in Mussorgsky's work, and his method of writing for the voice in small intervals, with much tonal repetition and attention to natural declamation, can be said to have been taken directly from Mussorgsky.

== See also ==
- In Memoriam to the Martyrs of Babi Yar

== Notes ==
1.This nickname neither appears on the title page of the symphony's manuscript score nor originates from the composer.

== Sources ==
- Blokker, Roy, with Robert Dearling, The Music of Dmitri Shostakovich: The Symphonies (London: The Tantivy Press, 1979). ISBN 978-0-8386-1948-3.
- Fay, Laurel, Shostakovich: A Life (Oxford: 2000). ISBN 978-0-19-513438-4.
- Figes, Orlando, Natasha's Dance: A Cultural History of Russia (New York: Picador, 2002). ISBN 978-0-312-42195-3.
- Layton, Robert, ed. Robert Simpson, The Symphony: Volume 2, Mahler to the Present Day (New York: Drake Publishing Inc., 1972). ISBN 978-0-87749-245-0.
- MacDonald, Ian, The New Shostakovich (Boston: 1990). ISBN 0-19-284026-6 (reprinted & updated in 2006).
- Maes, Francis, tr. Arnold J. Pomerans and Erica Pomerans, A History of Russian Music: From Kamarinskaya to Babi Yar (Berkeley, Los Angeles and London: University of California Press, 2002). ISBN 978-0-520-21815-4.
- Schwarz, Boris, ed. Stanley Sadie, The New Grove Dictionary of Music and Musicians (London: Macmillan, 1980), 20 vols. ISBN 978-0-333-23111-1.
- ed. Volkov, Solomon, trans. Antonina W. Bouis, Testimony: The Memoirs of Dmitri Shostakovich (New York: Harper & Row, 1979). ISBN 978-0-06-014476-0.
- Volkov, Solomon, tr. Antonina W. Bouis, Shostakovich and Stalin: The Extraordinary Relationship Between the Great Composer and the Brutal Dictator (New York: Alfred A. Knopf, 2004). ISBN 978-0-375-41082-6.
- Wilson, Elizabeth, Shostakovich: A Life Remembered, Second Edition (Princeton, New Jersey: Princeton University Press, 1994, 2006). ISBN 978-0-691-12886-3.
