= Offertorium =

Concerto by Sofia Gubaidulina

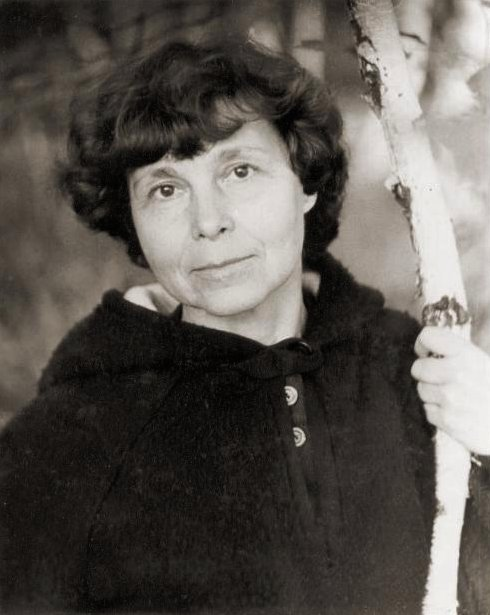
Sofia Gubaidulina in 1981

Offertorium (Russian Жертвоприношение) is a concerto for violin and orchestra composed by Sofia Gubaidulina in 1980 and revised in 1982 and 1986. It is dedicated to Gidon Kremer, who in touring with it around the world brought Gubaidulina to international attention.

== History ==
The story of Offertorium’s commission began with a chance conversation between the composer and Gidon Kremer, of whose playing skills Gubaidulina was an immense admirer, during a cab ride they happened to share. Though not well acquainted with Gubaidulina’s work, Kremer was impressed by those of her works he had heard, and he made an offhand request to her to write him a violin concerto. The request stuck in the composer's mind, and from that chance encounter, Offertorium was born – even though Kremer's whirlwind success, and the permission he had received to play outside the Soviet Union for two years, soon led him to forget all about it.

Gubaidulina began working on the piece in the summer of 1979, taking musical advice from Pyotr Meshchaninov and completing it in March 1980. She drew inspiration from Kremer’s performance style; in particular, she took advantage of his handling of opposites and their transitions and his tone, which she recognized as expressing “total surrender of the self to the tone.” Offertorium is thus an example of a piece crafted both for and from the person to whom it was composed and dedicated.

Like many of her other pieces, Offertorium contains religious elements. Even the name is a reference to that section of a Mass (performed immediately after the Credo) that is sung while the priest is offering up the prepared bread and wine. The work takes as its overarching theme the concepts of sacrifice and offering: the sacrifice of Christ during the Crucifixion, God’s offering in creating the Earth, the sacrifice of the performer to the tone, the sacrifice of the composer to the art, and the sacrifice of the main musical theme to disintegration and, later, reconstruction.

== Themes ==
The work is centered on the musical theme given by Frederick the Great to Johann Sebastian Bach which formed the basis of his Musikalisches Opfer (BWV 1079). Gubaidulina orchestrates this theme using a Klangfarbenmelodie technique reminiscent of Webern, passing it around various instruments to exploit their different timbres.

The introduction presents the theme almost whole: it lacks only the last note. The soloist then enters, beginning a series of variations, each of which removes one note from the beginning and end of the theme. (After the third variation, the original theme is hard to make out.) After the theme's demise, the central section is a free rhapsody.

The final section is a slow string chorale that resembles a Russian Orthodox hymn. Beneath this, the harps and piano reconstruct the theme note by note, in reverse (retrograde), a process that concludes only at the very end with a complete statement from the solo violin. In uniting her twin inspirations, Webern and Bach, and in the deep Christian symbolism of the theme's "death" and "resurrection", Offertorium is a work representative of Gubaidulina's mature period.

== Performance ==
The prospects for a performance of Offertorium were tenuous, however: Kremer, the person to whom it had been dedicated and given to perform, was at odds with the Moscow government for refusing to return to the Soviet Union at the end of his two-year period of permission to perform worldwide. Gubaidulina was worried that her piece would never be performed by Kremer, who instead chose to stay in the West. The work’s subject matter was also a barrier to its being performed, as religion was a touchy topic at the time. (In fact, Gubaidulina was unofficially criticized by Tikhon Khrennikov for her heavy use of religion as inspiration). Faced with such bleak circumstances, Gubaidulina asked her publisher Jürgen Köchel to smuggle the score to Kremer through the All-Union Agency on Copyrights. While this was happening, Gubaidulina attempted to have the chorale from Offertorium used in a film (The Great Samoyed by Arkady Kordon) for which she was scoring the music, but this was rejected by the director. The score did, however, finally reach the West and Kremer, who found a venue – the Wiener Festwochen – and the necessary resources to perform the forty-minute piece.

Offertorium was first performed in 1981 in Vienna by Kremer and the ORF Symphony Orchestra, directed by Leif Segerstam, and was immediately lauded for its striking beauty. In Russia, it was first performed in 1982 (in the Great Hall of the Moscow Conservatory) by Oleg Kagan and the Symphony Orchestra of the Ministry of Culture under Gennady Rozhdestvensky. Gubaidulina was requested to prepare a shortened version, completed in 1986, although it is debatable whether the concerto actually needed cutting; nonetheless, the changes did not detract from appreciation of the work, and the revised edition has spread around the globe, bringing Gubaidulina to worldwide attention.
