= Stimmen Verstummen =

1986 symphony by Sofia Gubaidulina

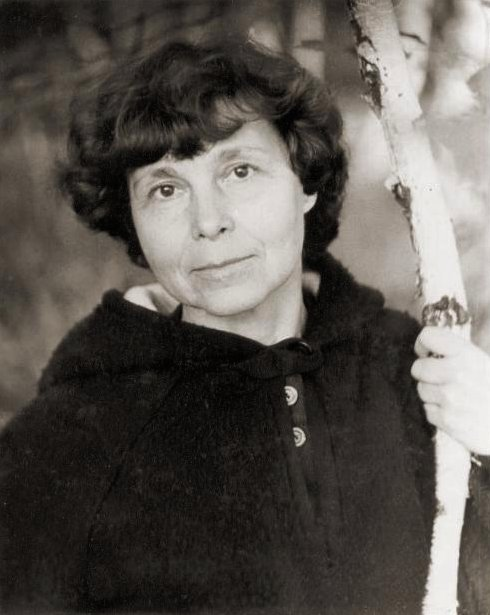
Sofia Gubaidulina in 1981

Stimmen... Verstummen... (Russian Слышу... Умолкло..., English Voices... Silence...) is a symphony in twelve movements by Russian-Tatar composer Sofia Gubaidulina. It was written in 1986 and dedicated to the conductor Gennady Rozhdestvensky, who gave the first performance in West Berlin with the Moscow State Symphony Orchestra on September 4, 1986. It takes the two words of its title from a poem by Francisco Tanzer.

Stimmen... Verstummen... is primarily organized around two themes. The first is that of a major triad, occurring as D-major in the first, third, and fifth movements and as a G-major triad in the tenth and twelfth movements. The second theme, that of "effort and ruin", occurs in the second, fourth, and sixth movement. Movements I, III, V, and VII become progressively shorter according to the proportions of the Fibonacci sequence.

The symphony is notable for its careful and innovative use of silence. Though the eighth movement has the largest proportions of the work, the climax actually takes place in the ninth movement when the conductor motions before a silent orchestra. The motions the conductor makes are meant to cause his hands to move increasingly further apart from each other according to the Fibonacci sequence. This "conductor solo" is repeated at the end of the work, when after the last note is sounded the conductor continues to motion for several minutes.
