= Triple Concerto (Gubaidulina) =

Orchestral work by Sofia Gubaidulina

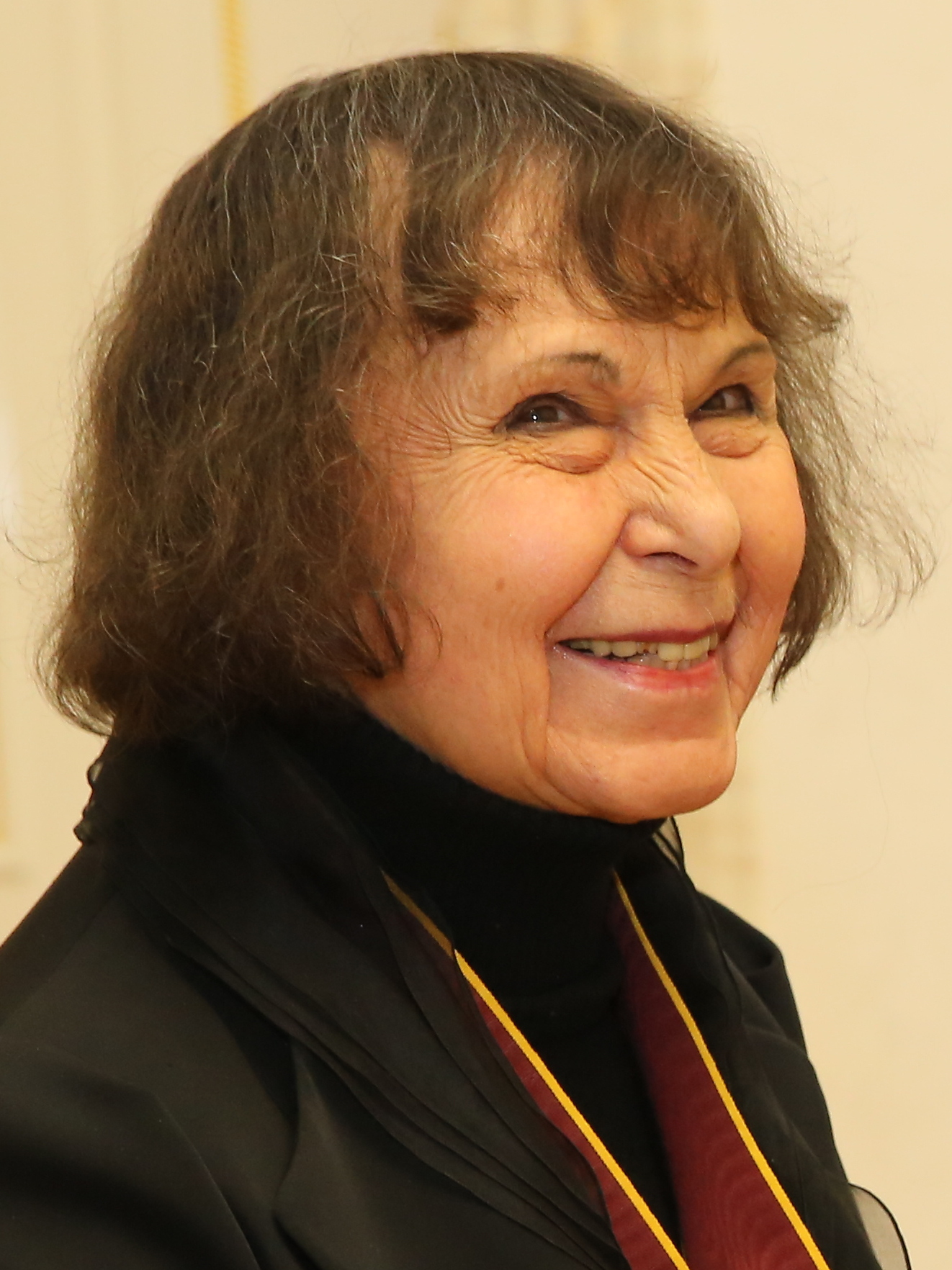
Sofia Gubaidulina in 2016

The Triple Concerto is a composition for violin, cello, bayan, and orchestra written in 2017 by the Russian composer Sofia Gubaidulina. The work was jointly commissioned by the Boston Symphony Orchestra, Carnegie Hall, the NDR Radiophilharmonie, and the Tonhalle-Orchester Zürich. Its world premiere was given by the violinist Baiba Skride, cellist Harriet Krijgh, accordionist Elsbeth Moser, and the Boston Symphony Orchestra conducted by Andris Nelsons at Symphony Hall, Boston, on 23 February 2017. The piece is dedicated to Elsbeth Moser.

== Composition ==
The concerto is cast in one continuous movement spanning three sections and lasts about 30 minutes.

=== Instrumentation ===
The work is scored for solo violin, cello, and bayan and a large orchestra consisting of four flutes (4th doubling piccolo), three oboes, three clarinets (3rd doubling bass clarinet), four bassoons (4th doubling contrabassoon), six horns, four trumpets (4th doubling piccolo trumpet), three trombones, two tubas (2nd doubling contrabass tuba), timpani, three to four percussionists, celesta, and strings.

== Reception ==
Reviewing the world premiere, Zoë Madonna of The Boston Globe highly praised the concerto, writing, "Gubaidulina here imbued the element of breath into every instrument. The sound of the bayan appeared with a dark major seventh dyad, and low swells of sound rolled from the basses and tuba, introducing ascending intervals in the solo cello and violin and subtle dynamic arcs in the strings. Baiba Skride drew whistling harmonics out of her violin, and in dialogue with it, Harriet Krijgh’s cello line fluttered upward. It seemed a new universe was being born onstage, a cosmic egg crisscrossed with intervallic paths. Set against passages of chromatic haze, consonances and triads resounded with extra luminosity." She added, "The music created the illusion of human voices, the purest representation of breath, and time seemed to expand and contract with the spectrum of sounds. Near the end, the music seemed to wind back toward the muted primordial frequencies from which it came, but it was not to be. The full force of the orchestra rushed in with a blazing ascent to the heavens, Jacob's ladder in terrifying brightness." Aaron Keebaugh of the Boston Classical Review similarly lauded the piece as "one of [Gubaidulina's] most important works," adding, "The audience seemed to recognize this, showering the composer and the musicians with cheers of appreciation."
