= Music for Flute, Strings, and Percussion =

Music for Flute, Strings, and Percussion is a piece written by Sofia Gubaidulina in 1994 dedicated to Pierre-Yves Artaud.

The instruments are divided into two sections, one of which is tuned a quarter-tone lower than the other. Gubaidulina (2001) describes, "in this way the potential of treating both halves as 'light' and 'shadow' emerges." She uses three chords, one major, one minor, and one whose third is exactly halfway between ("this triad possesses architectural significance, but also a symbolic meaning") being used at importance cadence points also determined by the five open strings of the higher orchestra section. The flute is in tune with this higher section, but through microintervals and glissandos also coincides with the lower section.

The piece has been recorded and released on:

- The Canticle of the Sun (1997) and Music for Flute, Strings, and Percussion (1994). The first performed by cellist and conductor Mstislav Rostropovich and London Voices conducted by Ryusuke Numajiri, the second by flutist Emmanuel Pahud and the London Symphony Orchestra conducted by Rostropovich. Gubaidulina attended the recording of both pieces.
