= Dmitri Klebanov =

Soviet Ukrainian composer and teacher (1907–1987)

Dmytry Klebanov
- Дмитрий Львович Клебанов
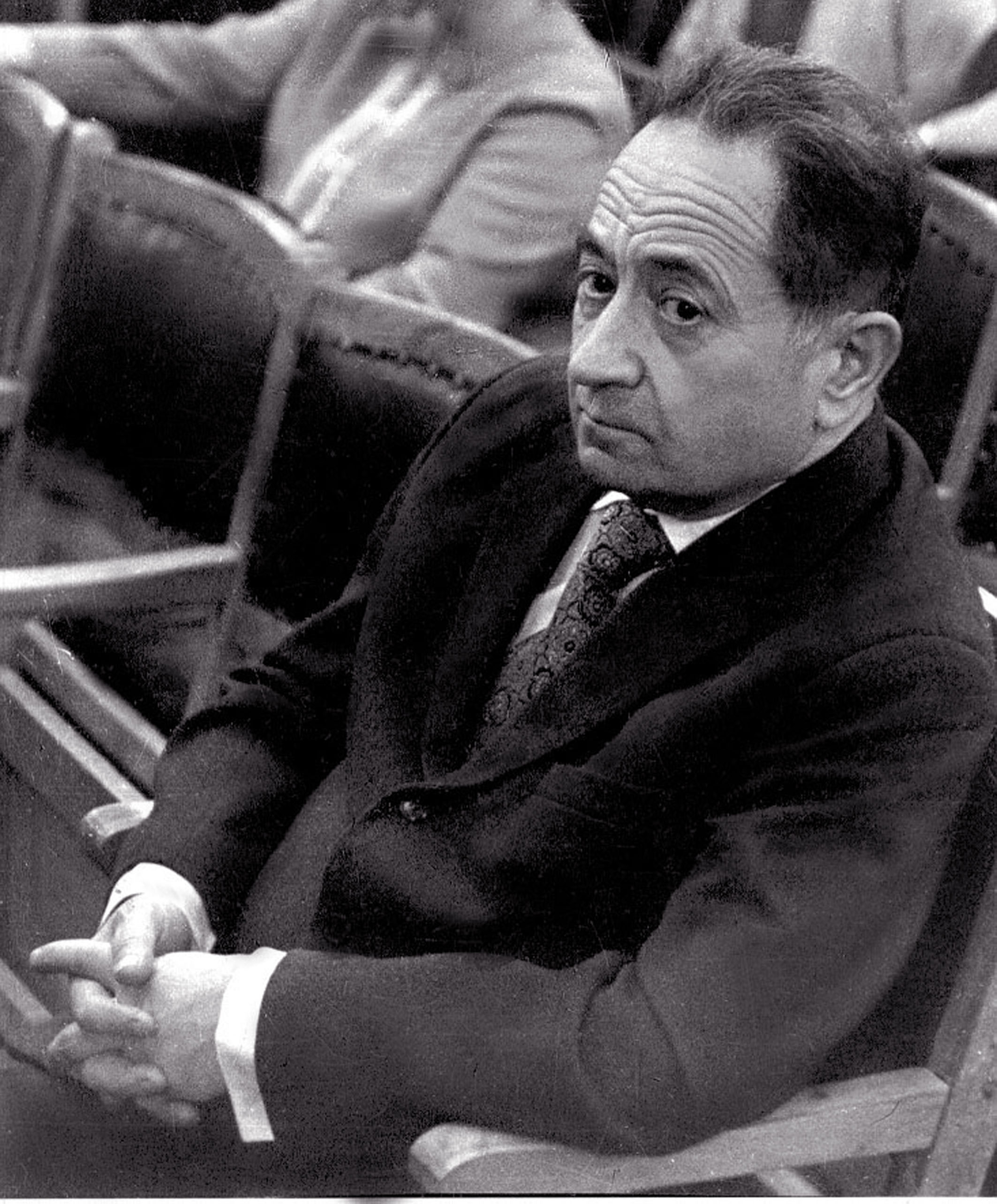
- Klebanov in 1974
- Born: 25 July [O.S. 12 July] 1907; Kharkiv, Russian Empire
- Died: 6 June 1987
- Education: Kharkiv Institute of Music and Drama
- Occupations: Violinist; Composer; Conductor; Academic teacher

Dmytry Lvovych Klebanov (Ukrainian: Дмитро Львович Клебанов; Russian: Дми́трий Льво́вич Клеба́нов; 25 July [O.S. 12 July] 1907 – 6 June 1987) was a Soviet-era Ukrainian composer. He studied violin and composition at the Kharkiv Institute of Music and Drama. He was a professor at the Kharkiv Conservatory from 1960.

== Life and career ==
Born in 1907 in Kharkiv, Klebanov began to learn the violin at age six, and a year later began studies in violin and composition at the Kharkiv Institute of Music and Drama. He graduated in 1926 in composition, supervised by Semyon Bogatyrev.

Klebanov was a violinist in the Leningrad Kirov Orchestra. He returned to Kharkov to study with Herman Adler. He conducted the Kharkov Radio Orchestra in the 1930s. He lectured at the Kharkiv Music and Drama Institute from 1934. Early compositions included the ballets Lelechnia (Little Storks) and Svitlana, and a violin concerto.

During World War II, Klebanov was evacuated to Tashkent in the Uzbek SSR, until he returned in 1943, settling first in Kyiv, then in 1945 in Kharkiv again. He was appointed head of the local branch of the Union of Composers of Ukraine and head of the department for composition in the Department of Music and Drama Institute. When he dedicated his First Symphony "In Memoriam to the Martyrs of Babi Yar" (1947) to the victims of the Babyn Yar massacre, he was criticized by Communist party critics, the citation naming him a "rootless cosmopolitan", alluding to his Jewish roots. He had been called a "Ukrainian bourgeois nationalist" when he had dedicated his String Quartet No. 4 to the memory of Mykola Leontovych. He was dismissed from his posts.

In 1960, during Khrushchev's "thaw", he was again appointed professor at the Kharkiv Conservatory (from 1963 the Kharkiv Institute of Arts). In 1966, he was a member of the jury of the third International Tchaikovsky Competition in Moscow. He held the teaching position until 1987. Among his students were Valentin Bibik, Vitaliy Hubarenko, and Viktor Suslin.

== Compositions ==
Opera

- By One Life (Единой жизнью) (1947)
- Vasily Gubanov (Василий Губанов) (1966)
- The Communist (Коммунист) (1967); revision of Vasily Gubanov
- Red Cossacks (Красные казаки) (1971)
- The Baby Stork (Аистенок), Children's Opera (1934)

Ballet

- The Baby Stork (Аистенок) (1936)
- Svetlana (Светлана) (1939)

Musical comedy

- The Amur Guest (Амурский гость) (1938)
- To Your Health (За ваше здоровье) (1941)
- My Guard (Мой гвардеец) (1942)
- My Boy (Мой мальчик) (1947)

Orchestral

- На западе бой, Poem for orchestra (1931)
- Ukrainian Concertino (Украинское концертино) (1940)
- Symphony No.1 In Memoriam to the Martyrs of Babi Yar (1945)
- Ukrainian Suite (Украинская сюита) (1949)
- Symphony No.2 (1952)
- Symphony No.3 (1956)
- Symphony No.4 (1958)
- Symphony No.5 (1959)
- Suite No.1 for chamber orchestra (1971)
- Four Preludes and Fugues (Четыре прелюдии и фуги) (1975)
- Heroic poem, dedicated to the 30th anniversary of Victory in the Great Patriotic War (Героическая поэма, посвященная 30-летию победы в Великой Отечественной войне) (1975)
- Suite No.2 for chamber orchestra (1976)
- Symphony No.6 (1981)
- Symphony No.7 (1982)
- Symphony No.8 "Poeme about bread" for soprano, bass and orchestra (1983)
- Symphony No.9 (1989)

Concertante

- Concerto No.1 for violin and orchestra (1939)
- Poem-Fantasia on a Theme of Nishchinsky (Поэма-фантазия на тему Нищинского) for cello and orchestra (1950)
- Concerto No.1 for cello and orchestra (1950)
- Concerto No.2 for violin and orchestra (1951)
- Concerto for dombra and orchestra (1956)
- Concerto for flute, harp, string orchestra and percussion (1974)
- Concerto No.2 for cello and orchestra (1977)
- Concerto for viola and string orchestra (1983)
- Japanese Silhouettes for viola d'amore, soprano and ensemble (1987)

Chamber music

- String Quartet No.1 (1925)
- Nocturne and Canzonetta (Ноктюрн и канцонетта) for violin and piano (1926)
- String Quartet No.2 (1926)
- Piano Trio No. 1 (1927)
- String Quartet No.3 (1933)
- Song (Песня) for violin and piano (1943)
- String Quartet No.4 (1946)
- String Quintet (1953)
- Wind Quintet (1957)
- Melody and Waltz (Мелодия и вальс) for violin and piano (1958)
- Piano Trio No. 2 (1958)
- Piano Quintet (1962)
- String Quartet No.5 (1966)
- String Quartet No.6 (1968)

Piano

- Four Pieces (4 пьесы) (1957)

Film score

- Secrets of Counter-Espionage or Secret Agent (Подвиг разведчика), fiction, 92 minutes (1947)
