= Pyotr Meshchaninov =

Russia pianist and conductor

Pyotr Nikolaevich Meshchaninov (Russian: Пётр Николаевич Мещани́нов; 9 July 1944 – 18 November 2006) was a Russian pianist and conductor specialized in Russian contemporary music. He premiered Sofia Gubaidulina's Concerto for bassoon and low strings in 1976, and her 1981 Descensio was dedicated to him.
