= Triple Concerto No. 2 (Smirnov) =

Composition by Dmitri Smirnov

Triple Concerto
- No. 2
- by Dmitri Smirnov
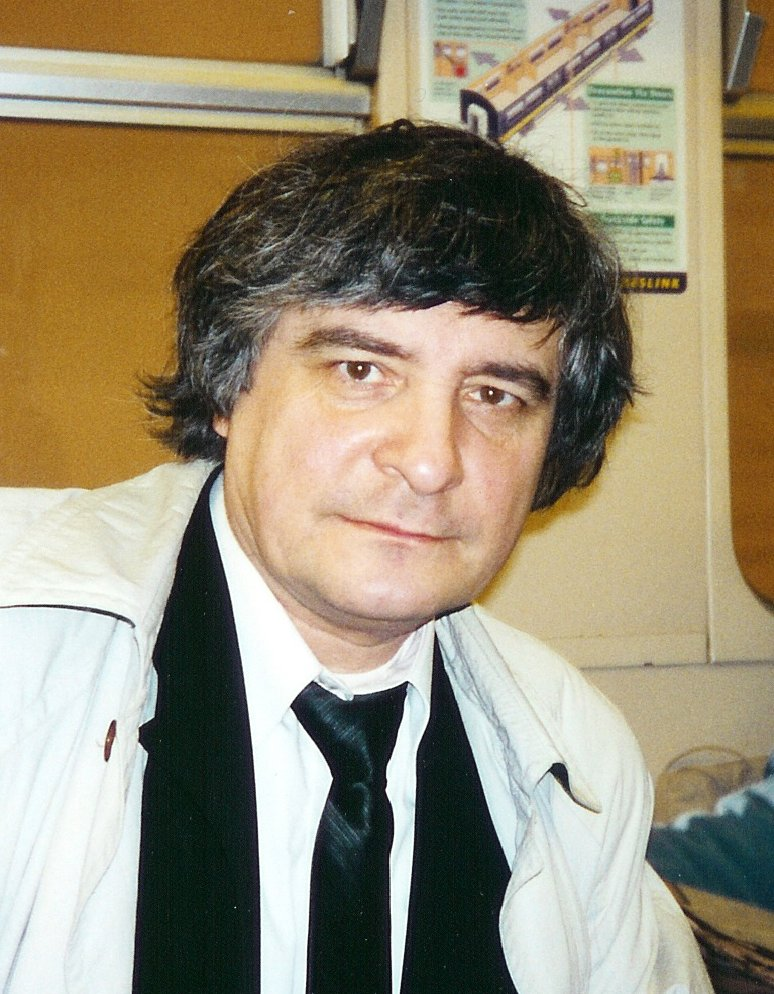
- The composer in 2006
- Occasion: Centenary of the London Symphony Orchestra
- Composed: 2003
- Performed: 26 May 2004
- Scoring: violin; harp; double bass; orchestra

The Triple Concerto No. 2, Op. 139, is a concerto for three instruments – violin, harp and double bass – and orchestra by Dmitri Smirnov, composed in 2003. It was premiered in the centenary concert of the London Symphony Orchestra on 26 May 2004, with principal players from the orchestra as soloists.

== History ==
Smirnov composed several concertos for single instruments, and two triple concertos for three instruments, the Triple Concerto No. 1 for saxophone, piano, double bass, strings and percussion in 1977 when he lived in Russia, and the Triple Concerto No. 2 for violin, harp, double bass and orchestra in 2003, when he was a resident of England. It was published by Boosey & Hawkes.

The world premiere of the Triple Concerto No. 2 was performed at the Barbican Centre in London on 26 May 2004. In the concert marking the centenary of the London Symphony Orchestra & Chorus (LSO), it was called LSO Centenary Concertante, and was combined with Mahler's Second Symphony "Resurrection", with Andrew Davis conducting the London Symphony Orchestra & Chorus. The soloists were violinist Gordan Nikolitch, harpist Bryn Lewis, and double bassist Rinat Ibragimov, all principal players of the LSO.

== Scoring ==
The Triple Concerto is structured in three sections or movements:

1. Con moto
2. Lento
3. Presto

Smirnov scored the work for the three solo instruments, and an orchestra consisting of piccolo, cor anglais, bass clarinet, percussion (3–4 players of timpani, triangle, suspended cymbal, maracas, woodblock, bongos, tom-tom, gongs, tam-tam, side drum, bass drum, glockenspiel, xylophone, bells), and strings. The concerto takes about 25 minutes to perform.

The first movement has been described by a reviewer as "music meant to wound", the second movement as "unsettling and angst-ridden", and the third movement was compared to a Hitchcock film track. The three solo instruments complement each other, comparable to the voice types soprano for the violin, mezzo-soprano for the harp, and basso profundo for the double bass. They are at times combined sounding like one voice, and at times "play in radical styles with distinctly foreign sounding voices". Episodes follow each other in collage fashion, in intentionally heterogeneous styles and sounds.
