= Sofia Gubaidulina =

Soviet and Russian composer (1931–2025)

- София Губaйдулина
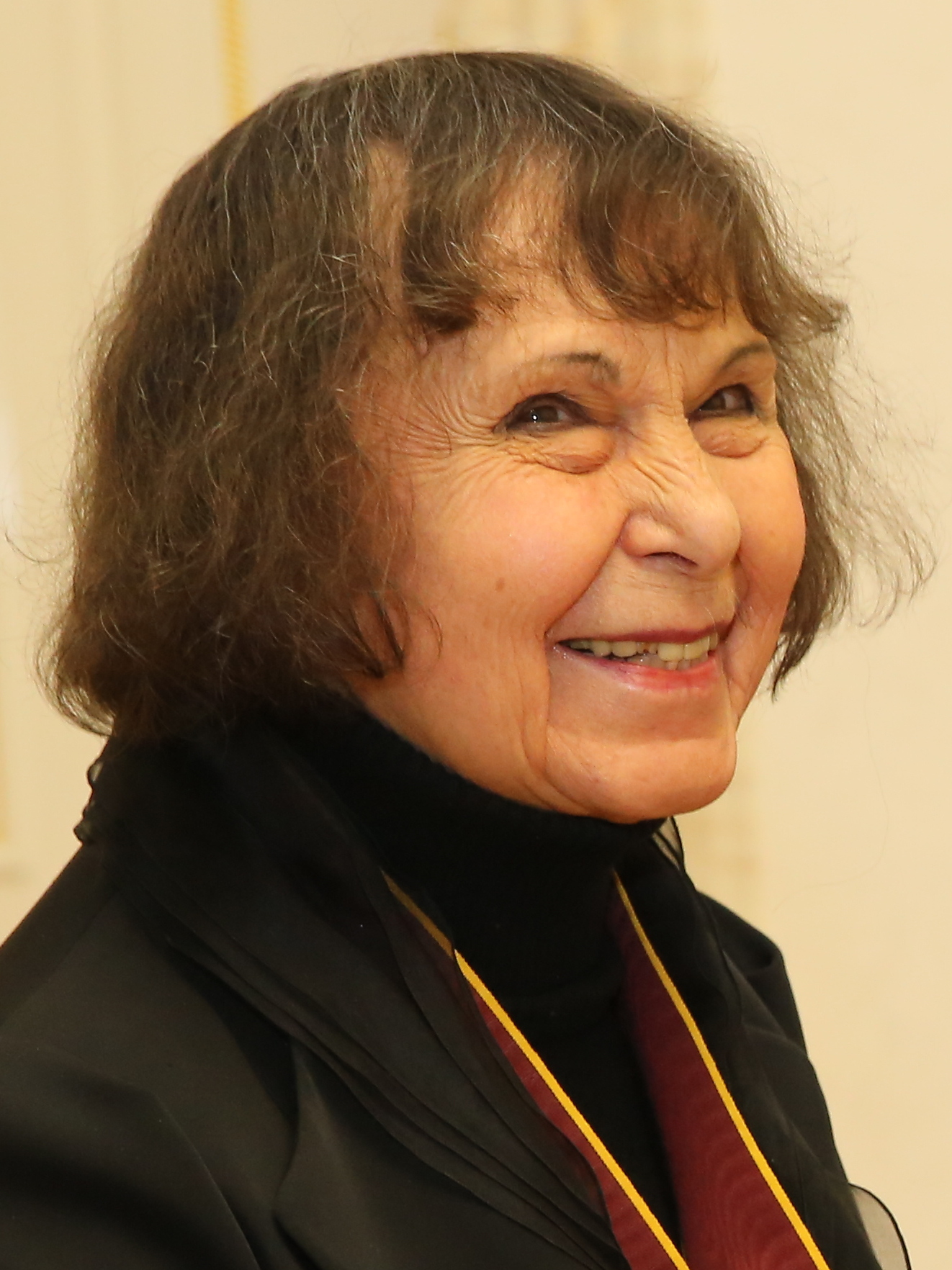
- Gubaidulina in 2016
- Born: 24 October 1931; Chistopol, Tatar ASSR, Russian SFSR, Soviet Union
- Died: 13 March 2025 (aged 93); Appen, Schleswig-Holstein, Germany
- Occupation: Composer
- Works: List of compositions

Sofia Asgatovna Gubaidulina (Note: Russian: Софи́я Асгáтовна Губaйду́лина; Tatar: София Әсгать кызы Гобәйдуллина) (24 October 1931 – 13 March 2025) was a Soviet and Russian composer of modernist sacred music. She was highly prolific, producing numerous chamber, orchestral and choral works. Her output has been described as exploring the tensions between Western and Eastern music, and has been characterised by "innovative use of microtonality and chromaticism, rhythm over form and use of contrasting tonalities.

Her compositions have been praised for their "emotional intensity", while she described her music as bringing legato, that is, a sense of "connected flow into the fragmented staccato of life." Alongside Alfred Schnittke, Arvo Pärt and Edison Denisov, Gubaidulina was considered one of the foremost composers of the former Soviet Union who were disfavoured by the authorities including the KGB, but whose work became frequently commissioned and performed by major international orchestras, with her first major breakthrough being her violin concerto Offertorium (1980).

== Early life ==
Sofia Asgatovna Gubaidulina was born on 24 October 1931 in Chistopol, a town in Tatar ASSR, Russian SFSR, Soviet Union. Her father, Asgat Masgudovich Gubaidulin, was a surveyor and engineer of Volga Tatar origin, while her mother, Fedosiya Fyodorovna (née Yelkhova), was a teacher of Polish-Jewish descent.

After discovering music at the age of five, Gubaidulina learned to play on a small grand piano and immersed herself in ideas of composition. While studying at the Children's Music School with Ruvim Poliakov, she discovered spiritual ideas in the works of composers such as Bach, Mozart, and Beethoven. She quickly learned to keep her spiritual interests secret from her parents and other adults since the Soviet Union was hostile to religion. These early experiences with music and spiritual ideas led Gubaidulina to treat these two domains of thought as conceptually similar and explains her later striving to write music expressing and exploring spiritually based concepts.

== Career ==
Gubaidulina studied composition and piano at the Kazan Conservatory, graduating in 1954. During her early career, Western contemporary music was almost entirely banned from study, an exception being the Hungarian composer Béla Bartók. Raids took place in the dormitory halls, where searches were conducted for banned scores, with those by Stravinsky being the most infamous and sought after. Gubaidulina and her peers procured and studied modern Western scores nonetheless, and she later said that "we knew Ives, Cage, we actually knew everything on the sly."

She later studied at the Moscow Conservatory with Nikolai Peiko until 1959, and then with Vissarion Shebalin until 1963, and was awarded a Stalin fellowship. In 1961, she joined the Union of Soviet Composers. Her music was deemed "irresponsible" during her studies in Soviet Russia, due to its exploration of alternative tunings. She was supported by Dmitri Shostakovich, who in evaluating one of her exams encouraged her to continue on her path despite others, such as composer Tikhon Khrennikov, calling it "mistaken". She was allowed to express her modernism in various scores she composed for documentary films, including the 1963 production, On Submarine Scooters, a 70 mm film shot in the unique Kinopanorama widescreen format. She composed the score to the 1967 Soviet animated film Adventures of Mowgli, an adaptation of Kipling's The Jungle Book.

In the mid-1970s Gubaidulina founded Astreja, a folk-instrument improvisation group with the Russian composers Viktor Suslin and Vyacheslav Artyomov. In 1979, she was blacklisted as one of the "Khrennikov's Seven" at the Sixth Congress of the Union of Soviet Composers for writing "noisy mud instead of musical innovation, unconnected with real life".

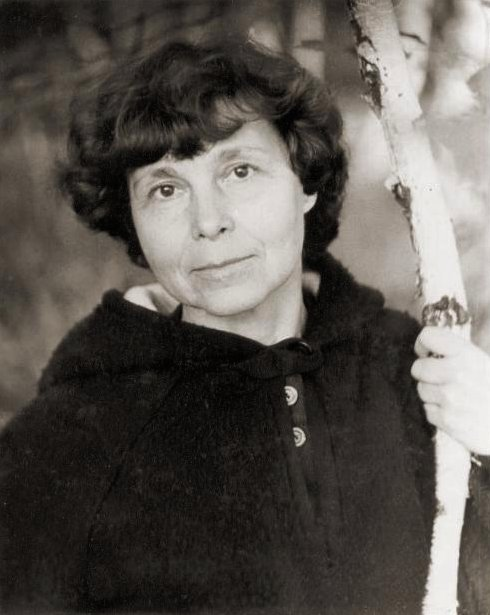
Gubaidulina in July 1981

Gubaidulina became internationally known during the early 1980s in part through Gidon Kremer's championing of her Offertorium violin concerto. In 2003, Jonathan Walker, in the Oxford Companion to Music, noted that "she sprang to international fame in the late 1980s". She later composed an homage to T. S. Eliot, using the text from the poet's Four Quartets. In 2000, Gubaidulina, along with Tan Dun, Osvaldo Golijov, and Wolfgang Rihm, was commissioned by the Internationale Bachakademie Stuttgart to write a piece for the Passion 2000 project in commemoration of Johann Sebastian Bach. Her contribution was the Johannes-Passion ("Passion according to John"). In 2002, she followed this with the Johannes-Ostern ("Easter according to John"), commissioned by NDR. The two works together form a "diptych" on the death and resurrection of Christ, her largest work. It was performed at the Royal Albert Hall in the 2002 BBC Proms.

Invited by Walter Fink, she was the 13th composer featured in the annual Komponistenporträt of the Rheingau Musik Festival in 2003, the first female composer of the series. Her work The Light at the End preceded Beethoven's Symphony No. 9 in the 2005 proms. In 2007, her second violin concerto In Tempus Praesens was performed at the Lucerne Festival by Anne-Sophie Mutter. Its creation was depicted in Jan Schmidt-Garre's film Sophia – Biography of a Violin Concerto. In 2023, her Sonata for Violin and Cello was performed at the Contemporary Music Center of Sofia Gubaidulina by Grammy-nominated violinist Anastasia Vedyakova and Andrey Kaminsky, associate professor at the Kazan State Conservatory. She served as composer-in-residence at Leipzig Gewandhaus Orchestra during 2019. She was a member of the musical academies in Berlin, Hamburg and the Royal Swedish Academy of Music.

== Personal life ==
Gubaidulina was a devout member of the Russian Orthodox Church. In 1973, she was attacked and strangled in the elevator of her apartment building in Moscow, but survived. Her friends later theorized the attacker was a KGB agent. Following the fall of the USSR, she lived in Appen, Germany, from 1992. The Steinway grand piano in her home was a gift from Rostropovich. She married three times; her second husband was writer and dissident Nikolai Bokov. Gubaidulina paused composing in 2012 after the deaths of her third husband Pyotr Meshchaninov, her daughter, and her friend and fellow composer Viktor Suslin.

Gubaidulina died from acute heart failure at her home in Appen on 13 March 2025, at the age of 93.

== Music ==
=== Aesthetic ===
Gubaidulina saw music as an escape from the socio-political atmosphere of Soviet Russia. She associated music with human transcendence and mystical spiritualism which manifests itself as a longing inside the human soul to locate its true being, a longing she continually tried to capture in her works. These abstract religious and mystical associations are realized in Gubaidulina's compositions in various ways, such as writing in bowing directions that cause the performer to draw a crucifix in the final movement of "Seven Words" for cello, bayan, and strings.

The influence of electronic music and improvisational techniques is exemplified in her combination of contrasting elements, novel instrumentation and the use of traditional Russian folk instruments in her solo and chamber works, including De profundis for bayan, Et expecto, the sonata for bayan, and In croce for cello and organ or bayan. The koto, a traditional Japanese instrument is featured in her work In the Shadow of the Tree, in which one solo player performs on three different instruments—koto, bass koto, and zheng. The Canticle of the Sun is a cello concerto/choral hybrid, dedicated to Mstislav Rostropovich. The use of the lowest possible registers on the cello opens new possibilities for the instrument.

Further influence of improvisation techniques can be found in her fascination with percussion. She associated the indeterminate nature of percussive timbres with the mystical longing and the potential freedom of human transcendence. In a 2021 interview with The New York Times, she said that percussion instruments "contain the essence of existence". In a 2012 interview with the modern British composer Ivan Moody, Gubaidulina provided an explanation for how percussion is utilized in her works to show spiritualism. She said,

... percussion has an acoustic cloud around it, a cloud that cannot be analyzed. These instruments are at the boundary between palpable reality and the subconscious, because they have these acoustics. Their purely physical characteristics, of the timpani and membranophones and so on, when the skin vibrates, or the wood is touched, respond. They enter into that layer of our consciousness which is not logical, they are at the boundary between the conscious and the subconscious.

She was preoccupied by experimentation with non-traditional methods of sound production and with unusual combinations of instruments, e.g. Concerto for Bassoon and Low Strings (1975), Detto – I, sonata for organ and percussion (1978), The Garden of Joy and Sorrow for flute, harp and viola (1980), and Descensio for 3 trombones, 3 percussionists, harp, harpsichord/celesta and celesta/piano (1981).

Gubaidulina said that the composers she most admired were J. S. Bach, Wagner and Anton Webern, as well as the Second Viennese School and 16th century music, most notably Gesualdo da Venosa and Josquin des Prez. Among some non-musical influences were Carl Jung and Nikolai Berdyaev, a Russian religious philosopher whose works were forbidden in the USSR.

Gubaidulina drew from literary traditions including but not limited to: ancient Egyptian poetry (Night in Memphis, 1968), Persian poetry (Rubayat, 1969), German poetry (The Garden of Joys and Sorrows, 1980, and Perception, 1983), works by Eliot (Homage to Eliot, 1987), and contemporary Russian poetry (Hour of the Soul, 1974, and Homage (1984)).

=== Style ===
Gubaidulina was a deeply spiritual person, and defined "re-ligio" as re-legato ("re-bound") or as restoration of the connection between oneself and the Absolute. She explained that she was "a religious Russian Orthodox person [who understood] 'religion' in the literal meaning of the word, as 're-ligio', that is to say the restoration of connections, the restoration of the 'legato' of life. There is no more serious task for music than this.” She found this re-connection through the artistic process and developed a number of musical symbols to express her ideals. She used narrower means of intervallic and rhythmic relationship within the primary material of her works, seeking to discover the depth and mysticism of the sound, and on a larger scale used the carefully thought architecture of musical form.

Her music is characterised by the use of unusual instrumental combinations. In Erwartung ("In Anticipation") combines percussion (bongos, güiros, temple blocks, cymbals and tam-tams among others) and saxophone quartet. Melodically, Gubaidulina uses frequent and intense chromatic motifs rather than long melodic phrases. She often treated musical space as a means of attaining unity with the divine—a direct line to God—concretely manifest by the lack of striation in pitch space. She achieved this through the use of micro-chromaticism (i.e., quarter tones) and frequent glissandi, exemplifying the lack of "steps" to the divine. This notion is furthered by her extreme dichotomy characterized by chromatic space vs. diatonic space viewed as symbols of darkness vs. light and human/mundane vs. divine/heavenly. Additionally, the use of short motivic segments allowed her to create a musical narrative that is seemingly open-ended and disjunct rather than smooth. Finally, another important melodic technique can be seen with her use of harmonics. When talking about her piece Rejoice!, a sonata for violin and cello, Gubaidulina explained,

The possibility for string instruments to derive pitches of various heights at one and the same place on the string can be experienced in music as the transition to another plane of existence. And that is joy.

Rejoice! uses harmonics to represent joy as an elevated state of spiritual thought.

Harmonically, Gubaidulina's music resists traditional tonal centers and triadic structures in favor of pitch clusters and intervallic design arising from the contrapuntal interaction between melodic voices. For example, in the Cello Concerto Detto-2 (1972) she noted that a strict and progressive intervallic process occurs, in which the opening section utilizes successively wider intervals that become narrower toward the last section.

Rhythmically, Gubaidulina placed significant stress on the fact that temporal ratios, i.e., rhythmic structures, should not be limited to local figuration; rather, the temporality of the musical form should be the defining feature of rhythmic character. As Gerard McBurney states:

In conversation she is most keen to stress that she cannot accept the idea (a frequent post-serial one) of rhythm or duration as the material of a piece. ... To her, rhythm is nowadays a generating principle as, for instance, the cadence was to tonal composers of the Classical period; it therefore cannot be the surface material of a work. ... [S]he expresses her impatience with Messiaen, whose use of rhythmic modes to generate local imagery, she feels, restricts the effectiveness of rhythm as an underlying formal level of the music.

To this end, Gubaidulina often devised durational ratios in order to create the temporal forms for her compositions. Specifically, she often utilized elements of the Fibonacci sequence or the golden ratio, in which each succeeding element is equal to the sum of the two preceding elements (i.e., 0, 1, 1, 2, 3, 5, 8, etc.). This numerical layout represents the balanced nature in her music through a sense of cell multiplication between live and unliving substances. She believed that this abstract theory was the foundation of her personal musical expression. The golden ratio between the sections is always marked by some musical event, and the composer explored her fantasy fully in articulating this moment. The first work in which Gubaidulina experimented with this concept of proportionality is Perception for soprano, baritone, and seven string instruments (1981, rev. 1983–86). The 12th movement, "Montys Tod" (Monty's Death), uses the Fibonacci series in its rhythmical structure with the number of quarter notes in individual episodes corresponding to numbers from the Fibonacci series.

In the early 1980s, she began to use the Fibonacci sequence as a way of structuring the form of the work. Her use of the Fibonacci sequence to determine phrase and rhythm length replaces traditional form, creating a new form which to her was more spiritually in tune. Gubaidulina experimented with other like series, including the Lucas series which begins by adding 2 instead of 1 to the initial value; the only thing setting it apart from Fibonacci. These forms are still fluid, as every other movement in her symphony Stimmen... Verstummen... follows the Fibonacci form. "It is a game!", she would claim. Later the Lucas and Evangelist series assimilated sequences derived from those of Fibonacci.

Valentina Kholopova, Gubaidulina's close friend and colleague, outlined the composer's form techniques in detail. In addition to using number sequences, Kholopova describes Gubaidulina's use of "expression parameters"; these being articulation, melody, rhythm, texture, and composition. The name suggests the immediate effects of each parameter on the listener. Each of these exists on a scale of consonance to dissonance, together forming the "parameter complex". For example, she describes a consonant articulation as legato, and a dissonant one as staccato, but each of these can change from piece to piece.

According to Kholopova, music from before the 20th century left the responsibility of articulation to the performer, while now it begs to be more heavily illustrated by the composer. She cites the writings of Viktor Bobrovski on his research on macrothemes, or central ideas that may occupy larger frames of time, such as entire sections of a piece. With this scale, pieces such as her Concordanza assume a mosaic form held together by Fibonacci-derived groupings of expression parameters, "modulating" between consonance and dissonance. This technique appears most clearly in her Ten Preludes for Solo Cello as six of its movements are names after modulation between parameters, and two being single parameters. Kholopova proposed that this scale could be used to analyze the music of any 20th century composer focused on texture, timbre and color, and that it is but one way to analyze music, signalling a continuing progression, catalyzed, according to Gubaidulina, by Webern.

=== Piano music ===
Gubaidulina's entire piano output belongs to her earlier compositional period and consists of Chaconne (1962), Piano Sonata (1965), Musical Toys (1968), Toccata-Troncata (1971), Invention (1974) and Piano Concerto "Introitus" (1978). Some of the titles reveal her interest in Baroque genres, especially Johann Sebastian Bach.

Later, she used the piano to incorporate the influence of John Cage's early experiments when he applied metal and rubber bolts to the piano strings to distort the instrument's sound.

== Awards and recognition ==
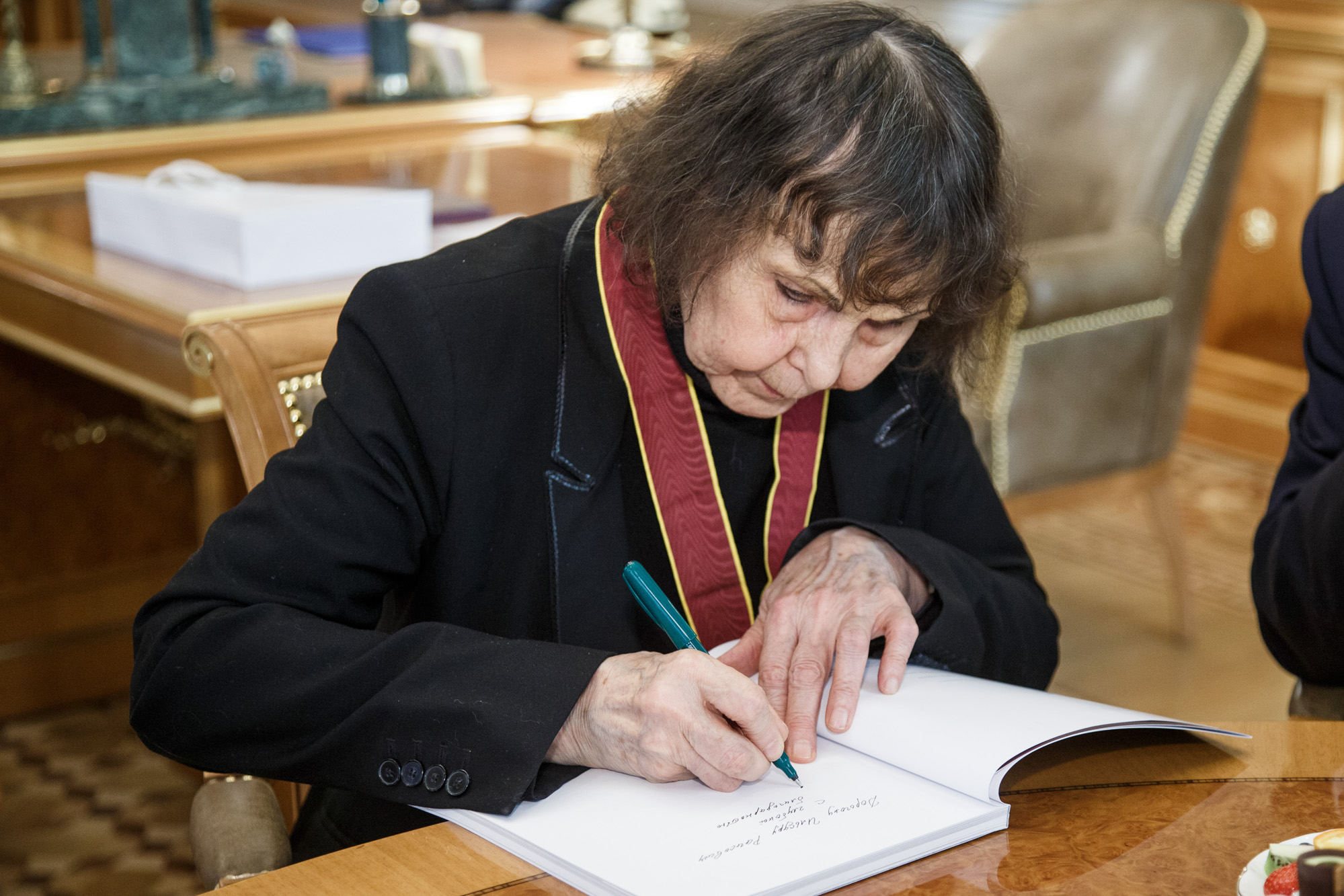
Gubaidulina in 2016

Gubaidulina achieved over 40 awards and prizes, in addition to other recognitions. On 4 October 2013 she became the recipient of the Golden Lion for Lifetime Achievement for the Music section of the Venice Biennale. She received the BBVA Foundation Frontiers of Knowledge Award (2016) in the contemporary music category. The jury praised the "outstanding musical and personal qualities" of the Russian composer, and the "spiritual quality" of her work.

Her 90th birthday in October 2021 was celebrated by the Gewandhaus Orchestra of Leipzig's release of three of her pieces. She was also celebrated in a week of chamber and orchestral music. In November she was selected as Composer of the Week on the long running show of the same name on BBC Radio 3.

=== List of prizes ===
Gubaidulina received prizes including:

- Rome International Composer's Competition (1974)
- Prix de Monaco (1987)
- Premio Franco Abbiati (1991)
- Heidelberger Künstlerinnenpreis (1991)
- State Prize of the Russian Federation (1992)
- Ludwig-Spohr-Preis der Stadt Braunschweig (1995)
- Kulturpreis des Kreises Pinneberg (1997)
- Praemium Imperiale in Japan (1998)
- Léonie Sonning Music Prize in Denmark (1999)
- Preis der Stiftung Bibel und Kultur (1999)
- Goethe-Medaille der Stadt Weimar (2001)
- Polar Music Prize in Sweden (2002)
- Bach Prize of the Free and Hanseatic City of Hamburg (2007)
- Knight Commander's Cross of the Order of Merit of the Federal Republic of Germany (2009)

=== Honorary degrees and positions ===
In 2001, Gubaidulina became honorary professor of the Kazan Conservatory. In 2005 she was elected as a foreign honorary member of the American Academy of Arts and Letters. In 2009, she became Dr. honoris causa of Yale University. In 2011 she was awarded a Doctor of Humane Letters honorary degree from the University of Chicago. On 27 February 2017, Gubaidulina was awarded an honorary doctor of music degree by the New England Conservatory, in Boston.

== Selected discography ==
- Solo Piano Works (1994: Sony Classical/SME SK 53960). "Chaconne" (1962), "Sonata" (1965) and "Musical Toys" (1968), performed by Andreas Haefliger, and "Introitus": Concerto for Piano and Chamber Orchestra (1978), Andreas Haefliger with the NDR Radiophilharmonie conducted by Bernhard Klee.
- The Canticle of the Sun (1997) and Music for Flute, Strings, and Percussion (1994). The first performed by cellist and conductor Mstislav Rostropovich and London Voices conducted by Ryusuke Numajiri, the second by flutist Emmanuel Pahud and the London Symphony Orchestra conducted by Rostropovich. Gubaidulina attended the recording of both pieces.
- Johannes-Passion (2000). Performed by Natalia Korneva, soprano; Viktor Lutsiuk, tenor; Fedor Mozhaev, baritone; Genady Bezzubenkov, bass; Saint Petersburg Chamber Choir (dir. Nikolai Kornev); Choir of the Mariinsky Theatre Saint Petersburg (dir. Andrei Petrenko); Mariinsky Theatre Orchestra Saint Petersburg conducted by Valery Gergiev. World premiere recorded live at the European Music Festival in Stuttgart, September 9, 2000.
