= Nutty Noah =

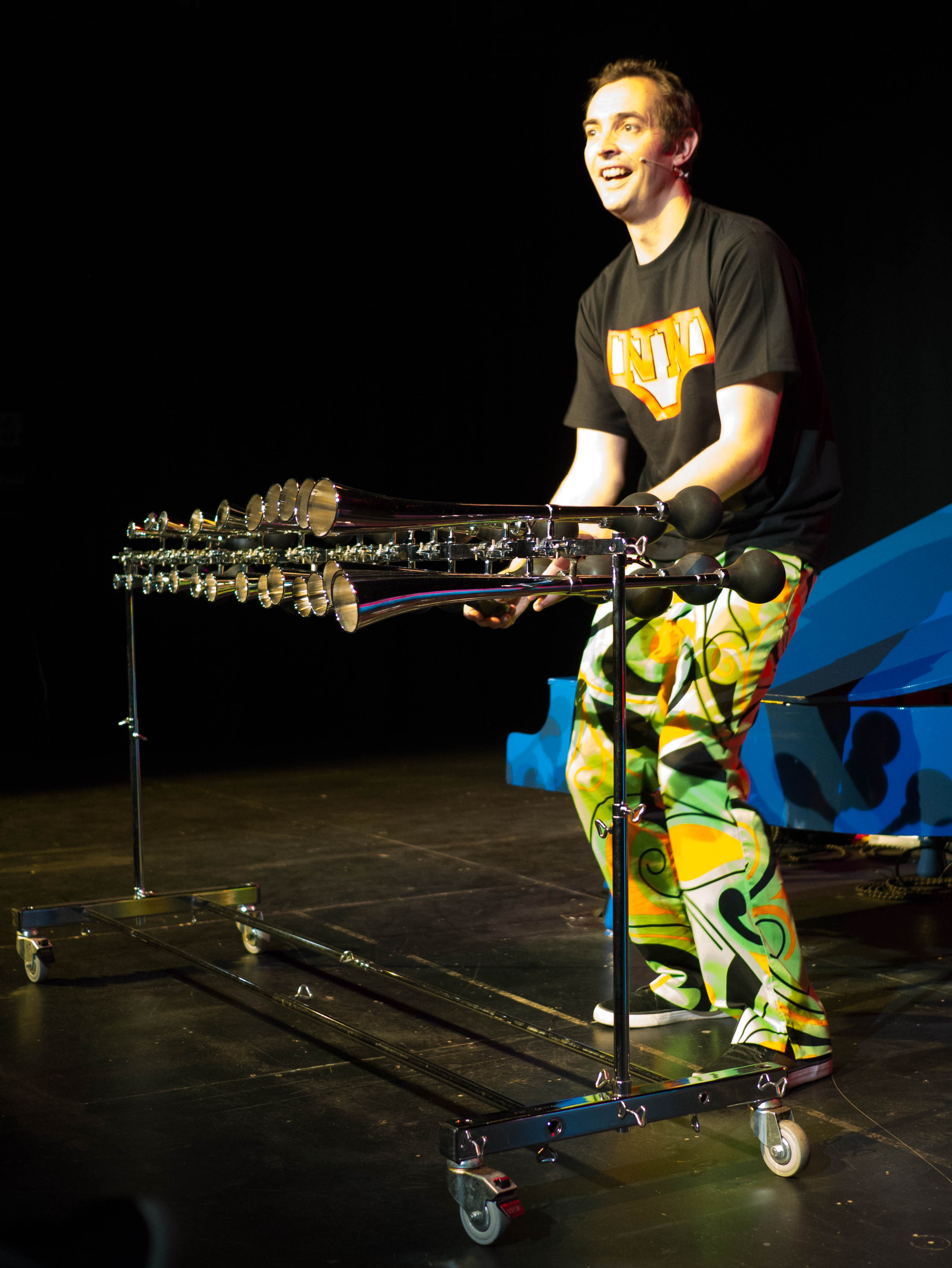
- Nutty Noah Playing the Hornophone

Background information
- Genres: Children's music
- Occupations: Singer; songwriter; entertainer
- Instruments: Vocals; piano; ukulele; kazoo; hornophone; percussion; stylophone; AlphaSphere; cowbells; boomwhackers; flexatone; stylophone
- Website: Official website

Nutty Noah is a British singer, songwriter, and entertainer, based in Somerset, England.

As an entertainer, he performs a mixture of magic, music, and comedy. As a singer-songwriter, he has recorded several albums of children's music.

Noah studied Performing Arts at Weston College of Further and Higher Education. He performed his first gig on New Years' Eve 1995 at Center Parcs. He has performed for over 20 years at Center Parcs, and at many other venues including Pennywell Farm, Komedia Bath and Brighton, Tobacco Factory Theatre Bristol, Tropicana Weston-super-Mare, and Finkley Down Farm. Ben Elton describes Noah as "The king of all things silly".

Nutty Noah plays many unusual instruments, including the hornophone, Boomwhackers, flexatone, Stylophone, and the Alphasphere. He has also invented many musical instruments, including the Buzzoffaphone (featured on Britain's Got Talent), the Boobaphone, and the Horny Cowbells (hornophone with added cowbells).

In 1996, Noah appeared on The Big Big Talent Show presented by Jonathan Ross, Takeover TV, How Do They Do That?, What's My Line, Talking Telephone Numbers, and The Big Breakfast.

In 2003, as a parody of the Frozen in Time stunt by illusionist David Blaine, Nutty Noah encased himself inside 16 blocks of Cheddar cheese, each weighing 20 kg, for 2 days. Radio 1 DJ Scott Mills was on "Cheese Watch" during the stunt.

In 2011, Nutty Noah was banned from appearing on the fifth series of Britain's Got Talent because his juggling balls were too large.

In 2012, Nutty Noah starred as Ambrose, the Grecian Pizza Parlour's new apprentice, in the BBC Learning Zone's "Let's Do Maths!" series.

Also in 2012, Nutty Noah auditioned for the sixth series of Britain's Got Talent where he played the British National Anthem “God Save the Queen” on the Buzzoffaphone.

In 2014, Nutty Noah appeared on BBC children's TV talent show The Slammer where he was covered in sloppy ploppy porridge.

In 2017, Nutty Noah debuted at the Edinburgh Festival Fringe, with a run in the Pleasance Courtyard from 21 to 28 August.

In February 2018, Nutty Noah won UK Family Entertainer of the Year at the Blackpool Magic Convention, which took place at the Winter Gardens, Blackpool.

In 2018, Nutty Noah performed a new show called "You Might Die" at Komedia Brighton, as part of the Brighton Fringe, and the Edinburgh Festival Fringe.

In 2020, Nutty Noah performed on BBC's Crackerjack! (TV series) episode 8, broadcast on 6 March. Noah also wrote a song about the difficulties of putting up with the COVID-19 pandemic called "Isolation Blues".

In 2021, Nutty Noah performed again on BBC's Crackerjack! (TV series) episode 9, broadcast on 26 February. Noah also wrote a Daft Punk inspired song, Feel the Beat, and was interviewed as part of the YouTube series "Your Take".

In 2022, Nutty Noah doubled for Jimmy Carr in episodes 3-5 of season 22 of 8 Out of 10 Cats Does Countdown playing an instrument made out of pipes and flip flops, wearing a balloon on his head, and playing the hornophone.

In 2023, Nutty Noah played the genie of the lamp in the Christmas pantomime version of Aladdin at the Grantham Guildhall Arts Centre.

In 2026, Nutty Noah auditioned for the nineteenth series of Britain's Got Talent with the Hornophone where he played “APT.” by Bruno Mars and Rosé.

Nutty Noah was interviewed on BBC Radio Bristol in 2015, 2016, 2018, 2019, and three times in 2020.

== Discography ==
Nutty Noah has also recorded four albums of children's music, and one album in 2021 with a more adult theme. As a musician, he is described as displaying "enormous talent".

Year	Title
2008	Silly Songs for Children
2011	Nutty Noah's Big Number Two
2014	Nutty Noah's Third Adventure
2018	You Might Die
2021	Songs In The Key Of Pandemic

Nutty Noah has also recorded a number of singles.
