= List of musical comedians =

This alphabetical list is limited to comedians who share their comedy through music; usually they sing and play an instrument onstage.

== List ==
- Kip Addotta – vocals, recorder
- David "Stringbean" Akeman – banjo
- Steve Allen – piano
- Woody Allen – clarinet
- Morey Amsterdam – cello
- Julie Andrews – vocals
- Fred Armisen – drums
- Arrogant Worms – guitar, vocals
- Axis of Awesome – guitar, keyboard, vocals
- David Baddiel – piano, guitar
- Bill Bailey – vocals, guitar, keyboard, theremin, hornophone
- Pete Barbutti – piano, accordion ("cordine"), trumpet
- Barnes & Barnes – guitar, keyboard, vocals
- Tom Basden – guitar
- The Bedroom Philosopher – vocals, guitar, accordion
- Kristen Bell – vocals
- Owen Benjamin – piano
- Mitch Benn – guitar, vibraphone, spoons
- Jack Benny – violin
- Laurie Berkner – acoustic guitar and vocals
- Ivor Biggun – guitar
- Mike Birbiglia – guitar
- Jack Black – vocals and guitar
- Dennis Blair – guitar
- Rachel Bloom – vocals
- Victor Borge – piano
- Bowser and Blue – guitar and vocals
- Harriet Braine – guitar
- Albert Brooks – piano
- Mel Brooks – drums
- Bo Burnham – vocals, piano, guitar
- Sid Caesar – saxophone
- Charlie Callas – drums
- Rob Cantor – guitar and vocals
- Rodney Carrington – guitar
- Jasper Carrott – guitar
- Dana Carvey – piano, guitar and drums
- Tommy Chong – guitar
- Stephen Colbert – vocals
- Billy Connolly – banjo, guitar, autoharp
- Jonathan Coulton – guitar
- Da Vinci's Notebook – vocals
- Les Dawson – piano
- Jessica Delfino – guitar, autoharp, ukulele
- Richard Digance – guitar
- Phyllis Diller – piano
- Doug Anthony All Stars – guitar, vocals
- Kyle Dunnigan – guitar, piano
- Jimmy Durante – piano, ukulele and vocals
- Kevin Eldon – guitar
- Lee Evans – piano
- Bridget Everett – vocals
- Jimmy Fallon – vocals and guitar
- Wayne Federman – piano, ukulele, drums
- Graham Fellows (as "John Shuttleworth") – keyboard
- Larry Fine – violin, piano, clarinet, saxophone
- Michael Flanders – piano
- Flight of the Conchords – guitar, bass, keyboards, omnichord
- The Folksmen – guitar, upright bass, mandolin, banjo
- George Formby – ukulele
- Jamie Foxx – vocals and piano
- Zach Galifianakis – piano
- Garfunkel and Oates – guitar, flute, piano, maracas, ukulele
- Paul Garner – piano
- Kyle Gass – guitar, recorder
- Jackie Gayle – drums
- Ricky Gervais – guitar
- Donald Glover (as "Childish Gambino") – rapping/singing
- George Gobel – guitar
- Boothby Graffoe – guitar
- Hank Green – guitar
- Parry Gripp – vocals
- Isabel Hagen - viola
- Rich Hall – keyboard, guitar
- Brian Haner – guitar
- Andrew Hansen – guitar, piano
- Hard n Phirm – numerous instruments
- Tim Hawkins – guitar, piano
- Joe Hawley – vocals, guitar
- Tim Heidecker – vocals, guitar, piano
- Ed Helms – piano, banjo, guitar
- Rainer Hersch – piano
- Sarah Hester Ross – piano, vocals, keytar
- Harry Hill – hornophone
- Homer and Jethro – guitar, banjo
- Hoosier Hot Shots – various
- Bob Hope – saxophone
- The Horne Section – jazz band led by Alex Horne
- Curly Howard – spoons
- Moe Howard – vocals
- Eric Idle (of Monty Python) – guitar, piano
- Neil Innes (of Monty Python) – guitar, piano, banjo
- Eddie Izzard – piano, clarinet
- Victoria Jackson – ukulele and vocals
- Jazz Emu
- Penn Jillette – bass guitar, upright bass
- Spike Jones – percussion and vocals
- Mickey Katz – clarinet
- Andy Kaufman – vocals, guitar, bongos, drums
- Buster Keaton – ukulele
- Boris Khaykin – rapper, beats, guitar, piano, synth
- Karen Kilgariff – guitar
- Sam Kinison – piano, guitar, drums
- Robert Klein – harmonica
- Koo Koo – vocals
- Jon Lajoie – guitar
- Hugh Laurie – piano, guitar and harmonica
- Gary Le Strange – vocals and electronic music
- Stewart Lee – guitar
- Tom Lehrer – piano
- Jerry Lewis – drums and trumpet
- The Lonely Island – vocals
- Matt Lucas (as George Dawes) – drums
- Stephen Lynch – guitar, piano
- Humphrey Lyttelton – trumpet
- Seth MacFarlane – vocals and piano
- Cheech Marin – guitar and vocals
- Demetri Martin – guitar, glockenspiel, piano, harmonica, tambourine, toy bells, keyboard, ukulele
- Steve Martin – banjo
- Chico Marx – piano
- Groucho Marx – guitar, mandolin
- Harpo Marx – harp, piano, clarinet
- Taylor Mason – piano
- Massacration – guitars, bass, drums
- David McSavage – guitar
- Kate Micucci – ukulele
- Spike Milligan – trumpet
- Tim Minchin – vocals, piano, guitar
- Eugene Mirman – theremin
- Montana Logging and Ballet Co. – guitar, keyboard, bass
- Dudley Moore – piano
- Dermot Morgan – guitar
- Martin Mull – guitar
- Eddie Murphy – vocals
- Kevin Nealon – guitar, banjo
- The New Main Street Singers – guitars, mandolins, tambourine
- Phil Nichol – guitar
- Conan O'Brien – guitar
- Bryant Oden – vocals
- David O'Doherty – keyboard
- Ardal O'Hanlon – keyboard
- Earl Okin – guitar, vocals (including mouth trumpet), piano
- Parachute Express – vocals, woodwinds and strings
- Rachel Parris – piano, vocals
- Sara Pascoe – guitar
- Paul and Storm – guitar, keyboard
- Henry Phillips – guitar
- Freddie Prinze – drums
- Richard Pryor – vocal, piano
- Geraldine Quinn – guitar
- Ted Ray – violin
- Raymond and Scum – guitar
- Howard Read – ukulele
- Rhett and Link – guitar, recorder and harmonica
- Anna Russell – piano and vocals
- Mark Russell – piano
- Bob Saget – guitar
- Andy Samberg – rapping and vocals
- Sammy J – piano
- Adam Sandler – vocals and guitar
- Scared Weird Little Guys – various instruments
- Akiva Schaffer – vocals (including rapping)
- Ronnie Schell – piano
- Peter Schickele, also known as P. D. Q. Bach – various instruments
- Helge Schneider – piano, trumpet, guitar, drums, clarinet/saxophone
- Harry Secombe – vocals
- Peter Sellers – drums, ukulele
- Gene Sheldon – banjo
- Waen Shepherd – vocals, electronic music, tin tray
- Sarah Silverman – guitar
- Phil Silvers – clarinet
- Sinbad – guitar, drums
- Frank Skinner – banjo, ukulele
- Brendon Small – guitar
- Dick Smothers – bass
- Tommy Smothers – guitar
- Spinal Tap – guitars, bass, drums and keyboard
- Jim Stafford – guitar
- Stanford Fleet Street Singers – vocals
- Ray Stevens – piano, banjo
- Jon Stewart – drums
- Vikki Stone – piano
- Storm Front – barbershop quartet
- Bruno Sutter (as "Detonator") – vocals
- Isy Suttie – guitar
- Donald Swann – piano
- Jorma Taccone – various instruments
- Jim Tavare – bass
- Tenacious D – guitars and vocals
- Judy Tenuta – accordion
- Jake Thackray – guitar and vocals
- Nick Thune – guitar
- Tripod – guitar, vocals, trumpet
- Thom Tuck – guitar and ukulele
- Carla Ulbrich – guitar
- Tracey Ullman – guitar
- Uncle Floyd (Floyd Vivino) – piano
- John Valby – piano
- Jackie Vernon – trumpet
- Reggie Watts – vocals, keyboards, loop machine
- Daniel Lawrence Whitney – guitar
- Kevin Bloody Wilson – guitar
- Tim Wilson – guitar
- Rev. Billy C. Wirtz – piano and organ
- Dennis Wolfberg – guitar
- Victoria Wood – piano and Vocals
- Frank Woodley – guitar, ukulele
- Steven Wright – guitar
- Ed Wynn – piano
- "Weird Al" Yankovic – vocals, accordion, keyboards
- Henny Youngman – violin
- Roy Zimmerman – guitar
