= UCW =

UCW may refer to:

- Union Carriage & Wagon, a rolling stock manufacturer in South Africa
- Union of Communication Workers
- University Centre Weston
- University of Worcester, formerly University College Worcester
- Aberystwyth University, formerly University College of Wales
- University Canada West
- United Campus Workers, an affiliate of the Communications Workers of America organizing higher education workers across the US.
