= Flexatone =

Modern percussion instrument

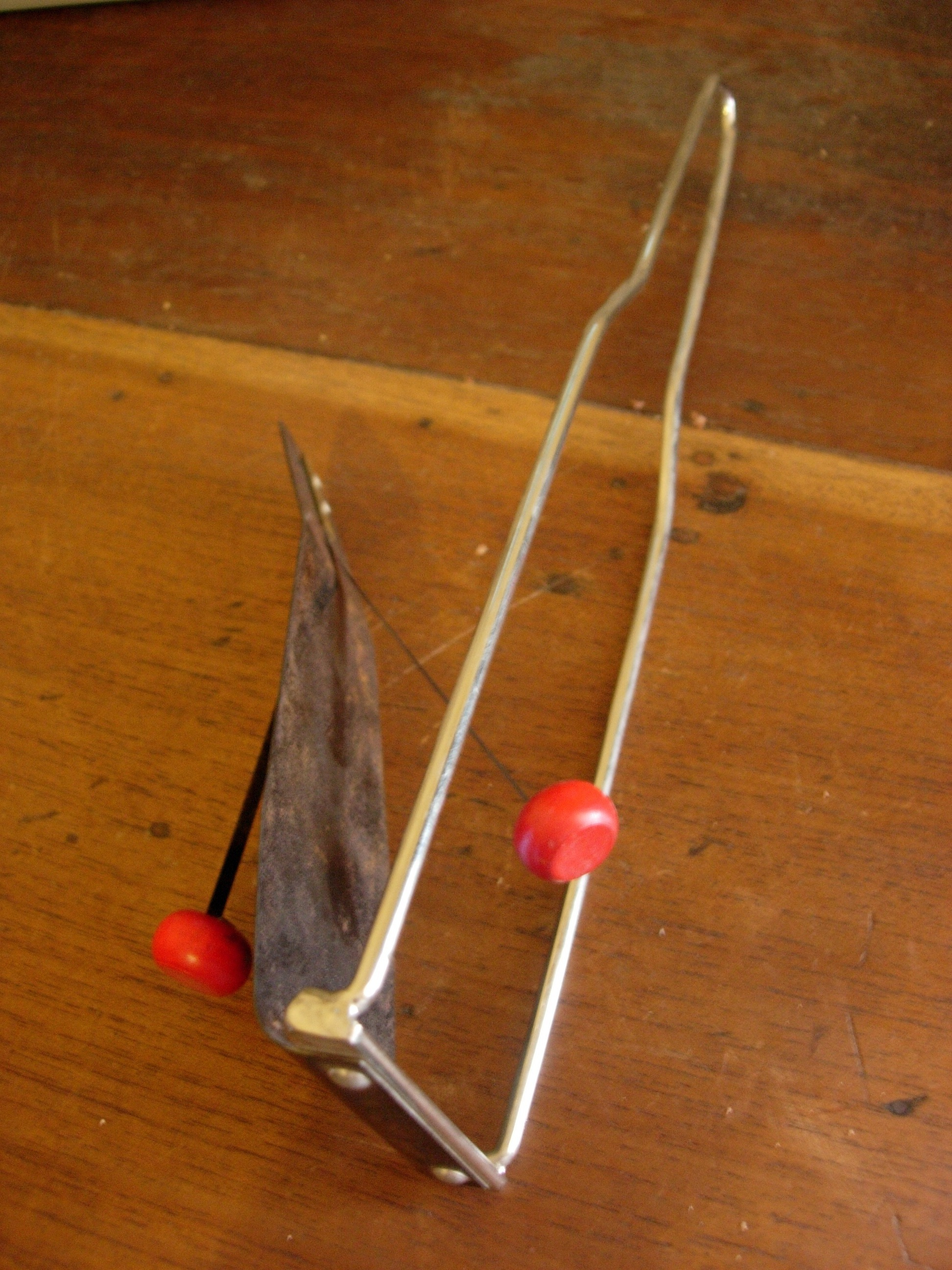

Percussion
- Classification: Percussion
- Hornbostel–Sachs classification: 112.12 (Frame rattles)
- Inventor(s): the Playertone Company of New York, Although we do not have any record of who exactly invented the flexatone
- Developed: 1922
- Timbre: bright, metallic
- Volume: medium
- Attack: fast
- Decay: slow

Playing range
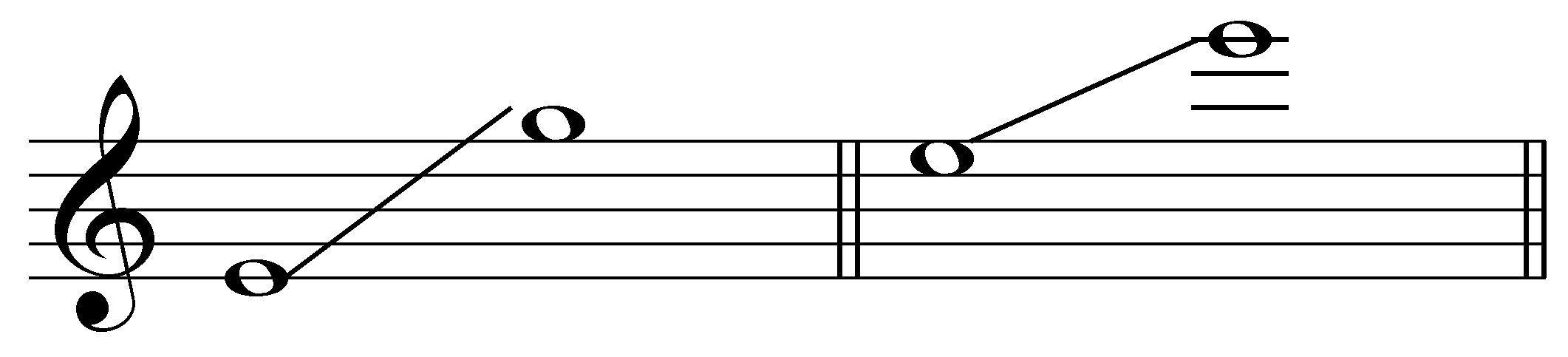
- E_{4}–G_{5} / E_{5}–E_{6} E_{2}–G#_{4} / D#_{3}–D#_{5} medium

Related instruments
- musical saw, ondes Martenot, slide whistle, vibraphone, water gong

Builders
- Playatone, Kolberg Percussion Steve Weiss Music

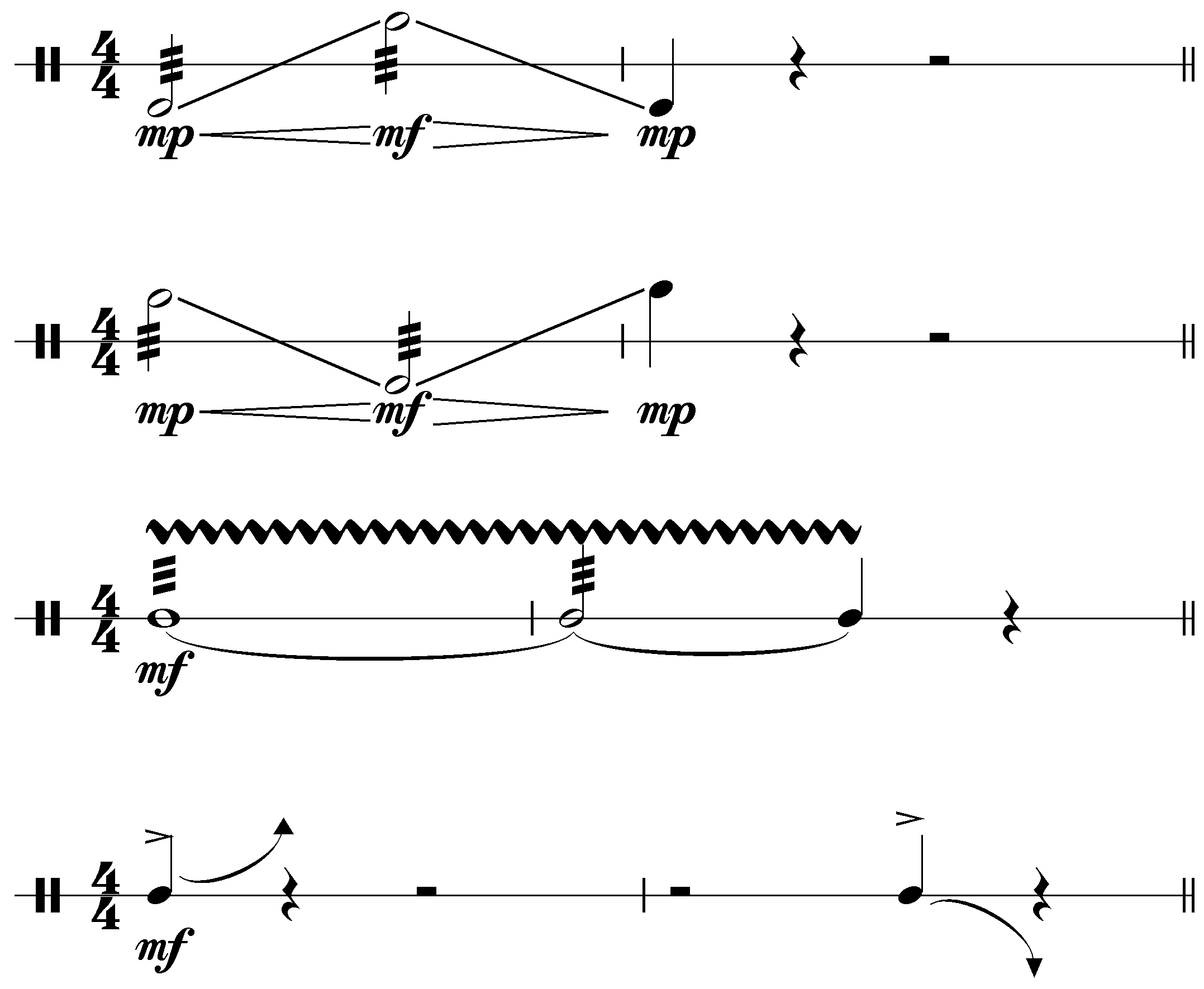
Suggested notation of music for flexatone, using roll symbols for the tremolo and approximate pitch

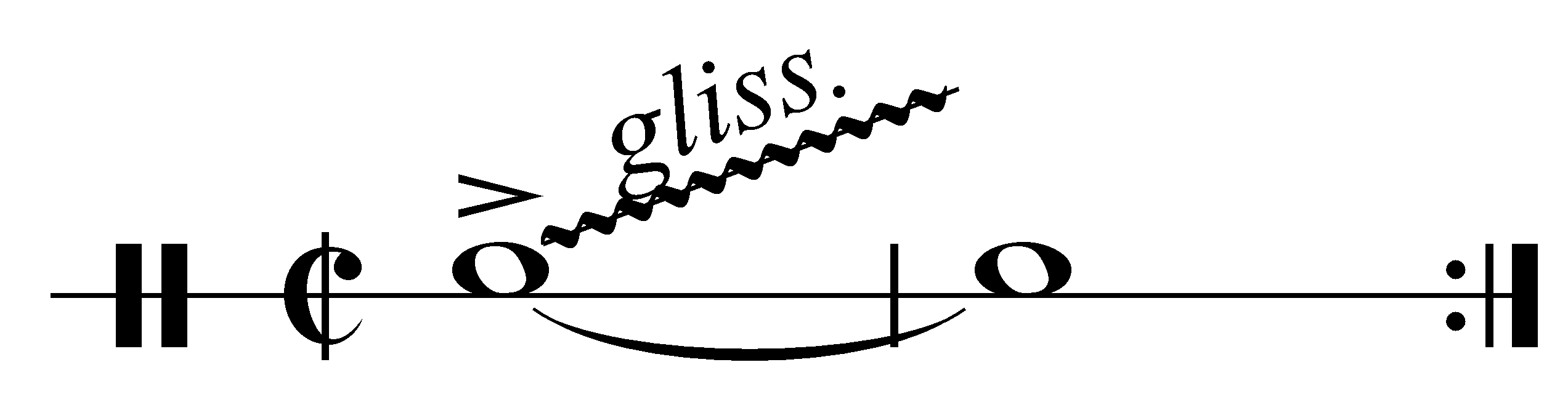
Rhythmic pattern easily playable on the flexatone

The flexatone or fleximetal is a modern percussion instrument (an indirectly struck idiophone) consisting of a small flexible metal sheet suspended in a wire frame ending in a handle. Used in classic cartoons for its glissando effect, its sound is comparable to the musical saw.

== History, construction and technique ==
[The] flexatone [is a] percussion instrument; shaking it causes two wooden balls, one on either side, to strike a metal blade subject to thumb pressure, which thereby can produce spooky glissando effects.

An invention for a flexatone occurs in the British Patent Records of 1922 and 1923. In 1924 the 'Flex-a-tone' was patented in the USA by the Playatone Company of New York. "An instrument called the 'Flex-a-tone' was patented in the U.S.A. in 1924 by the Playertone Company of New York. It was introduced as a new instrument, making 'jazz jazzier' and announced as combining the tone effect of musical saw, orchestra bells, and song whistle." "Small sheet of spring steel in a frame with wooden strikers mounted on either side. The player shakes the beater while bending the steel in order to change the pitch."

The instrument was first used in 1920s jazz bands as an effect but is now mainly and rarely used in orchestral music.

The flexatone is a small, thin, flexible metal plate fastened to its frame at one end. The plate is hit alternatively on each side by rubber or wooden beaters mounted on a clock spring. A tremolo is the normal effect, and thumb pressure on the free end of the plate alone changes the pitch, resulting in a glissando from note to note...It is usually employed as an abstract effect, since it is notoriously difficult to play specified pitches with any accuracy—the thumb pressure to sharpen or flatten is extremely subtle and difficult to gauge...The sound is quite clangy, a cross between the smoothness of a musical saw and a poor glockenspiel.

Wooden knobs mounted on strips of spring steel lie on each side of the metal sheet. The player holds the flexatone in one hand with the palm around the wire frame and the thumb on the free end of the spring steel. The player then shakes the instrument with a trembling movement which causes the beaters to strike the sides of the metal sheet. While shaking the handle, the musician makes a high- or low-pitched sound depending on the curve given to the blade by the pressure from his or her thumb: "As the thumb depresses the vibrating metal sheet, the relative pitch of the instrument ascends; as the thumb pressure is released, the relative pitch of the instrument descends." A vibrato is thus produced. While the instrument has a very limited dynamic range, volume can be controlled by how vigorously or delicately the player shakes the Flexatone.

It cannot be pretended that its scope or range are wide, but such as it is, it is quite irreplaceable. Its curious penetrating whine is created by rapid oscillation of the little wooden knob at the end of the thin flexible strips against the broad curving metal plate, whose curvature—and hence pitch—is controlled by the thumb. This effect cannot be emulated by any other means except possibly the Ondes Martenot...or perhaps the musical saw.

"Vibes generally make a perfectly acceptable alternative, especially when the music is somewhat indeterminate anyway."

An alternate technique involves removing the two wooden knobs and their mounting springs, and then using a small metal rod (e.g., a triangle beater) held in the free hand striking the strip of spring steel. The pitch is altered in the same manner as the previous technique. "This method give the player greater control of the sound of the flexatone as it eliminates the need to shake the instrument." This method of playing results in a different, more constrained sound. The flexatone may also be bowed along its edge with an orchestral string instrument bow.

The flexatone is notated using tremolo lines (rolls) to indicate shaking the instrument and lines to indicate the desired direction of the glissando or a wavy line (chevron) to indicate alternating thumb pressure. If using the instrument with the balls removed, indicate strikes with single notes followed by arrows indicating the direction of the glissando (similar to a guitar tab pitch bend). It is recommended that pitch designation should only be approximate, as, "specific pitches are difficult but possible; glissandi without specific pitch are easily executed."

== Double meaning of the term "Flexatone" ==
In contemporary music of the 20th century between around 1920 and 1970 the term "Flexatone" has been used on one hand for the instrument flexatone, on the other hand for the musical saw. Composers who used it for the musical saw were: Arthur Honegger (Short opera Antigone, 1924/1927), Ernst Krenek (opera Jonny spielt auf, 1927), Dmitri Shostakovich (The Nose (1929), Lady Macbeth of the Mtsensk District (1934), and film music for The New Babylon (1929)), Aram Khachaturian (Piano Concerto 1936), and Hans Werner Henze (opera Elegy for young lovers, 1961).

== Uses ==
The flexatone is sometimes heard in funk music, and occasionally in pop music for special effect. It is occasionally used in the soundtracks of films or cartoons to represent "ghosts" or other paranormal phenomena. The instrument is also typical and common in G-Funk music.

The instrument is not often used in classical music, but it appears in the work of Arnold Schoenberg, Hans Werner Henze, Sofia Gubaidulina, György Ligeti and others. Schoenberg employed it, "unrealistically...accurate bursts of widely spaced sounds being hardly obtainable with such abruptness," in his Variations for Orchestra Op.31 (1928) and his unfinished opera Moses und Aron (1932). The cellist in Sofia Gubaidulina's The Canticle of the Sun (1998) plays a bowed flexatone before the final section. Alfred Schnittke used it in his Faust Cantata (1983), in the Tuba Mirum movement of his Requiem (1975), in his Viola Concerto (1985), and in his score for the ballet Peer Gynt (1987), the flexatone represents the sound of the moaning wind. György Ligeti used it in many of his works, such as his 1988 concerto for piano second movement and his opera Le Grand Macabre (1977). Peter Maxwell Davies uses it in the third movement of his Symphony No. 1 (1976), as well as three of them at the climax of his opera The Lighthouse (1980). Vivian Fine owned a flexatone, and used flexatone music in compositions such as The Race of Life (1937).

=== In popular culture ===
A Flexatone can be heard in the track "Sing Swan Song" by the band Can, from their 1972 album Ege Bamyasi. It is also used in the theme song of Grand Theft Auto: San Andreas (2004), as well as a recurring sound effect in the anime Mobile Suit Gundam and its sequels.

They Might Be Giants utilize a Flextone in their song "Stalk Of Wheat", from their 2004 album The Spine.

Josef Škvorecký incorporates the Flexatone as a narrative device in his story, "Oh, Maytime Witch!" in his 1975 book, Prima sezóna, published in English translation, in 1982, as The Swell Season.

== Samples ==
Sound of a flexatone
Playing 1

Sound of a flexatone
Playing 2

Sound of a flexatone
Playing 3

== See also ==
- Nutty Noah
- Heliogabalus imperator
