= Weston College =

College in England

- Motto: "Creating brighter futures"
- Established: 1845
- Principal: Pat Jones
- Founder: Sir Henry Cole
- Students: 30,000 (approx.)
- Undergraduates: 862
- Location: Weston-super-Mare, North Somerset, England; 51°21′03″N 2°58′53″W
- Website: weston.ac.uk

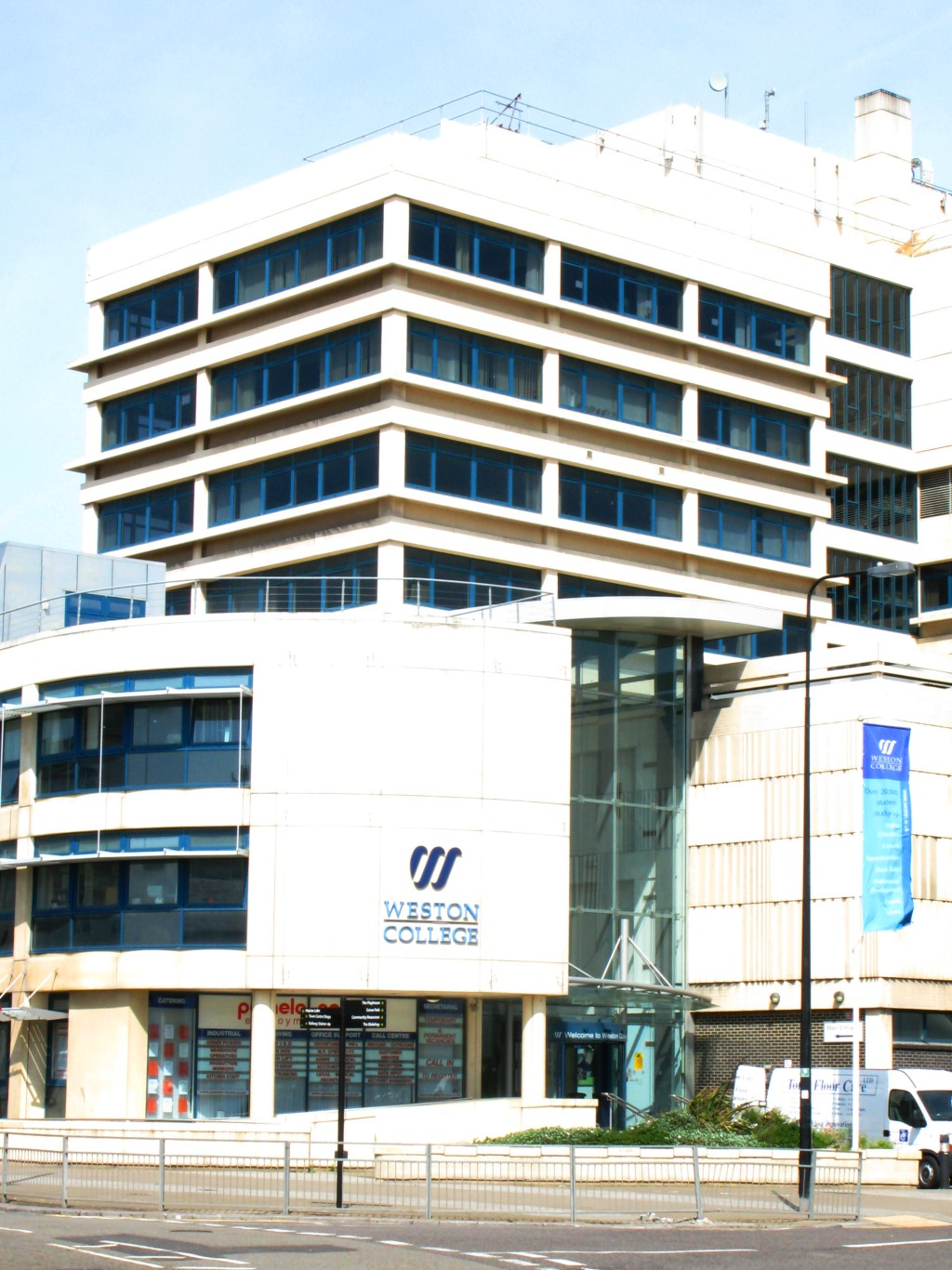
Knightstone Campus

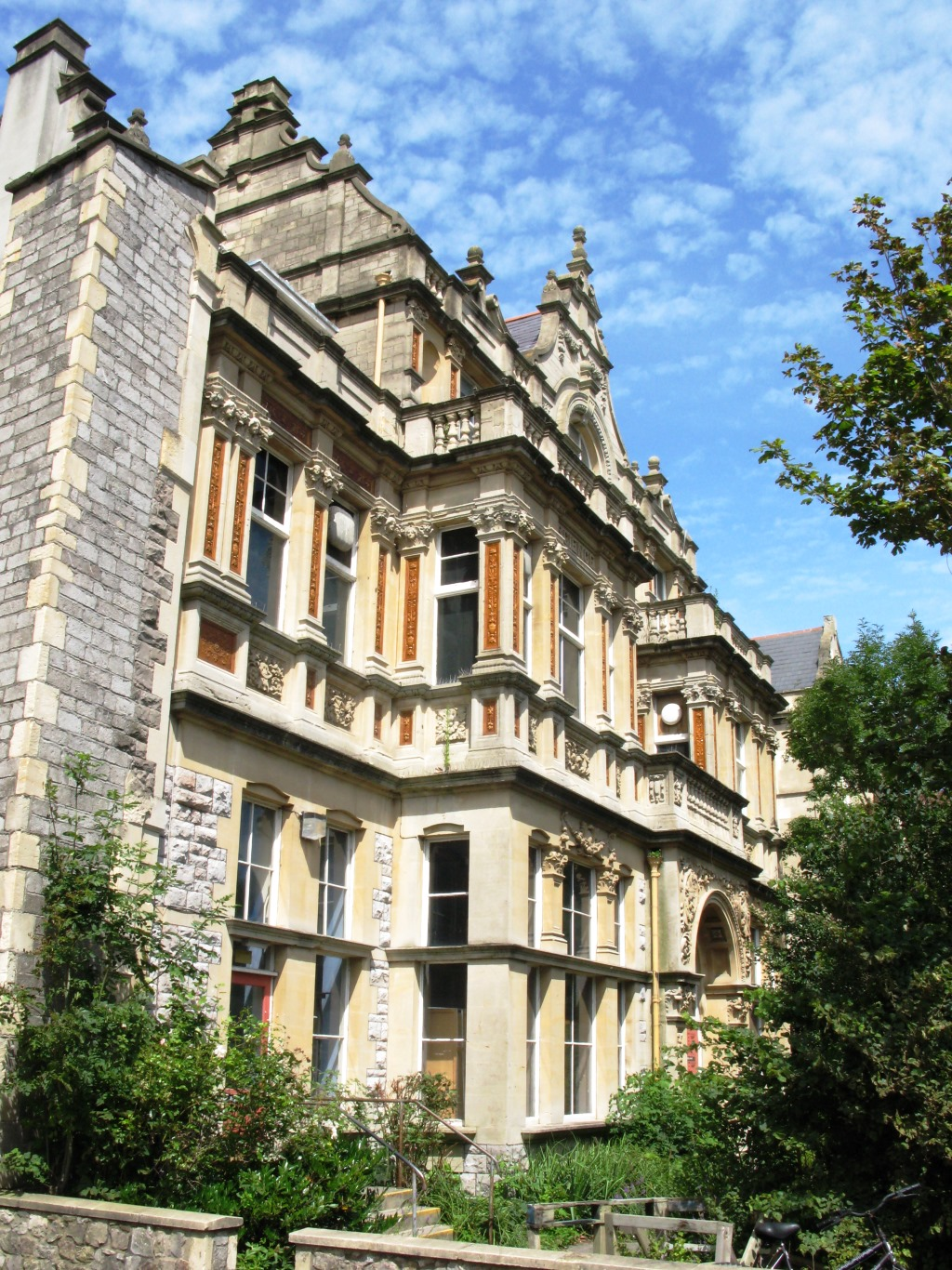
Weston College Conference Centre

Weston College of Further and Higher Education is a general college of further and higher education in Weston-super-Mare, North Somerset, England. It provides education and vocational training from age 14 to adult. The college provided education to approximately 30,000 enrolled learners. It is regarded as one of the top FE colleges in the UK, often winning high profile national awards. The college is part of the 9th largest college group in the UK.

In an Ofsted inspection in January 2014 it received an overall grade of "outstanding". In 2017, the college was awarded the Queen's Anniversary Prize for Higher and Further Education. On 27 February 2015, the college was named "College of the Year" and "Overall FE Provider of the Year" at the Times Educational Supplement Further Education awards. It is a major employer in Weston-super-Mare, employing over 500 members of staff, receiving Employer of the Year Award at the annual Lloyds Bank National Business Awards. On 25 November 2015, the college announced that it was to become a university centre in partnership with the University of the West of England.

== History ==
The first recorded educational building to be built on the college site was the National School, constructed at the corner of Knightstone Road and Lower Church Road. Its construction was funded by Archdeacon Henry Law, Weston-super-Mare's rector from 1834 to 1838 and also 1840 to 1862. Archdeacon Law donated approximately £15,000 towards the cost of churches, schools and other public buildings in the Weston area. The National School opened to 320 students on 22 September 1845 – the day George Henry Law (Bishop of Bath and Wells), the archdeacon's father, died.

In 1897, the boys’ department moved to the newly built Board School in Walliscote Road and the National School became a girls’ school. The school changed its name to St John's Church School and was closed in 1964 before being demolished in May 1966 to make way for the development of Weston Technical College, a building that is now used as the college's Knightstone Campus.

Following the mid-century reforms of Henry Cole and others, which promoted the creation of schools to develop a pool of skilled technicians and designers necessary to maintain the country's industrial dominance, the Hans Price-designed School of Science and Art, now known as the Weston College Conference Centre, was built in 1892 and opened the following year. The building was Grade II listed on 19 May 1983 and was completely refurbished from a derelict state in 2012. In August 2013, the college's redevelopment of the building was nominated for an English Heritage Angel Award to "recognise the time, effort and determination" of the college for the rescue of the building.

Plans to build Weston Technical College were granted approval in June 1965. The £550,000 college was opened on 9 September 1970 and has been an autonomous public body since 1 April 1993.

In 2014, North Somerset Council approached the college's leadership team with the idea of handing the Winter Gardens Pavilion over to the college to establish a new base for the college's expanding higher education provision and its proposed law and professional services academy. The building had previously been reported as running at a loss of around £30,000 per month. Plans to refurbish and redevelop the building were approved in October 2015, and the building was formally transferred to the college in April 2016.

On 25 November 2015, the college announced that it had been granted university centre status in partnership with the University of the West of England. Part of the college's new higher education provision is based in the Winter Gardens.

On 11 January 2016, the college announced that it had purchased the Arosfa Hotel in Weston-super-Mare to redevelop it as a Law and Professional Services Academy. It was reopened for teaching after extensive renovation in September 2016.

== Courses ==
The college offers A-level courses, vocational courses, apprenticeships, traineeships, courses for the unemployed and work-related courses. It also provides bespoke training for professionals across industry It has facilities for learners with difficulties and/or disabilities (SEND). This provision has been recognised nationally, and is now one of three SEND Centres for Excellence in the UK. It also offers some associate degree courses; its degrees are validated by Bath Spa University and by the University of the West of England.

The number of students enrolled in the college's higher education provision has grown considerably over the last decade. In 2009/2010 there were 450 undergraduate students on degree courses. In September 2015, the number of students enrolled in the college's higher education provision had almost doubled to 862.

In 2012, Weston College won a £10 million contract to provide education to inmates of 13 prisons in the South West of England. This has since increased, with the college providing education to 19 prisons across England.

In 2015, Weston College invested £1.5 million into creating a "Future Technology Centre" at the South West Skills Campus, enabling the college to teach a full engineering curriculum. In September 2015, Weston College announced that it had won a contract to train apprentices for GKN Aerospace. The engineering provision is recognised for being successful, which has led to contracts with businesses such as GKN, Rolls-Royce and Airbus.

== Campuses ==
Weston College has three main campuses: Knightstone Campus; Loxton Campus; and South West Skills Campus. Weston College has also opened three new campuses: The Health and Active Living Skills Centre; Animal Management Education Centre – based at Puxton Park; and the Construction Training Centre.

=== Knightstone Campus ===
The Knightstone Campus is the college's main site, located near Weston-super-Mare's town centre, and where its leadership team and support staff are primarily based. The Knightstone Campus is the tallest building in Weston at nine stories in height.

Along with classrooms and office space, the campus contains a library, a canteen, hair and beauty salons, a gym including a sports hall, a training kitchen and restaurant, and specialist facilities for people with learning difficulties and disabilities. The building also has a university centre on its sixth floor, and a wing of performing arts and musical theatre studios in a single story extension at the rear of the building.

In 1998, the college renovated the Knightstone Campus to soften and modernise its reception's appearance. The college's entrance was originally located on the first floor, accessible by a flight of stairs located on the college's southern, Knightstone Road facing elevation. The renovation moved the entrance to the ground floor and relocated it on the college's east elevation, facing Lower Church Road.

=== Loxton Campus ===
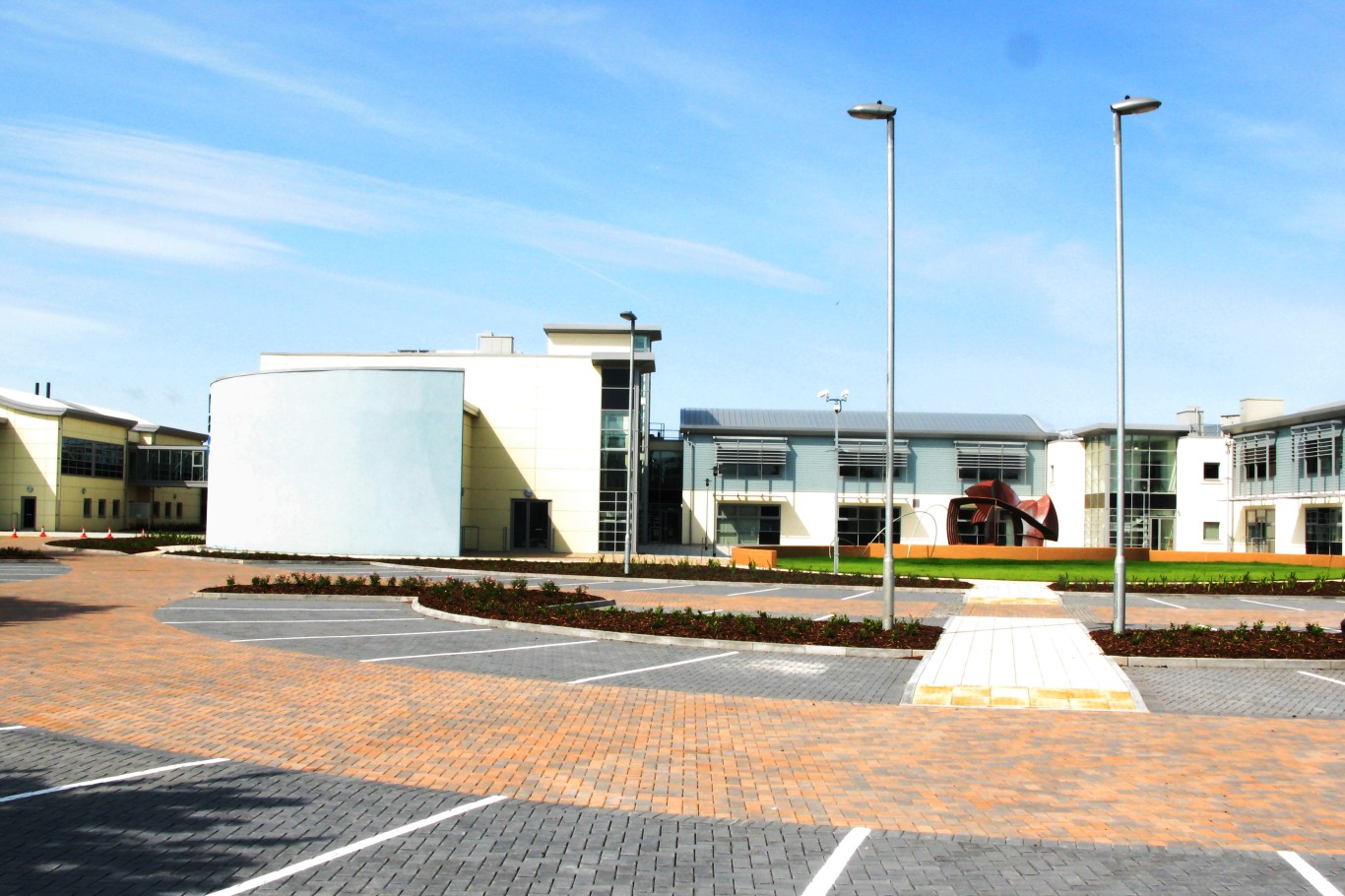
Loxton Campus

North Somerset Council transferred the Broadoak Sixth Form College on Loxton Road to Weston College in 1998. It was relaunched as Weston College's Sixth Form Centre the following year.

Construction began on the plot adjacent to the sixth form centre in 2006 to create Weston College's Loxton Campus. The £15 million university campus was opened by Princess Anne on 23 June 2008. It was named the Jill Dando Centre in commemoration of murdered local television presenter and journalist Jill Dando, who had attended when it was Broadoak Sixth Form.

The campus contains a series of suites and studios from which the college teaches its A-level courses and a variety of creative courses: art, music and drama. The facilities include performance spaces, creative arts workshops, graphic design studios, recording and rehearsal suites, a library and a canteen. The building also has its own sports pitch. The Health and Active Living Skills Centre is part of the campus. It focuses on vocational qualifications in healthcare and sport.

=== South West Skills Campus ===
The South West Skills Campus on Locking Road comprises the college's 'Technology, Engineering and Construction Centre of Excellence', its automotive training centre, its Training Solutions, its eco-house and its 'Future Technology Centre', which includes its engineering centre.

In August 2015, the campus was nominated for the Best Educational Building and Best Change of Use of an Existing Building categories at the Local Authority Building Control Building Excellence Awards.

=== Satellite Centres ===
In 2012 the 10-bedroom Weston Bay Hotel was refurbished as residential accommodation for learners with special educational needs, with a focus on learners on the autism spectrum. The facility promotes independent living and social skills, and assist its learners by increasing their access to Higher Education and career opportunities.

In January 2015, North Somerset Council agreed to sell Weston-super-Mare's Winter Gardens Pavilion to the college for the nominal fee of £1. The sale is part of the council's plan to regenerate Weston-super-Mare's town centre and the college intend to turn the building into a Law and Professional Services Academy.

== Assessment ==
The college was assessed by OFSTED in December 2013, and was classified in Grade I, "outstanding", for overall effectiveness, for its results, for teaching quality, and for management effectiveness. It was the first general further education college in the West of England to receive this grade under the new OFSTED framework. It was assessed as Grade I in five of its nine subject areas, and Grade II, "good", in the remaining four.

The college's 2016 A Level results indicated that 99% of its students passed, with 74% achieving at least one grade above a 'C', and 46% achieving 'B' to 'A*'. In 2018, the college's A-level result pass rate remained at 99% for the third consecutive year.

In 2014, more than 20 per cent of the college's Bachelor of Arts graduates achieved a first class honours degree, beating the national average of 16 per cent. In September 2015, this number of graduates achieving first class honours rose to 21.3%.

In 2016, higher education teaching at Weston College was assessed by the Quality Assurance Agency for Higher Education. It reported that the college met expectations and that the quality of student learning opportunities was 'commended', which is the highest grade the organisation can give.

== Weston College Group ==
=== University Centre Weston ===
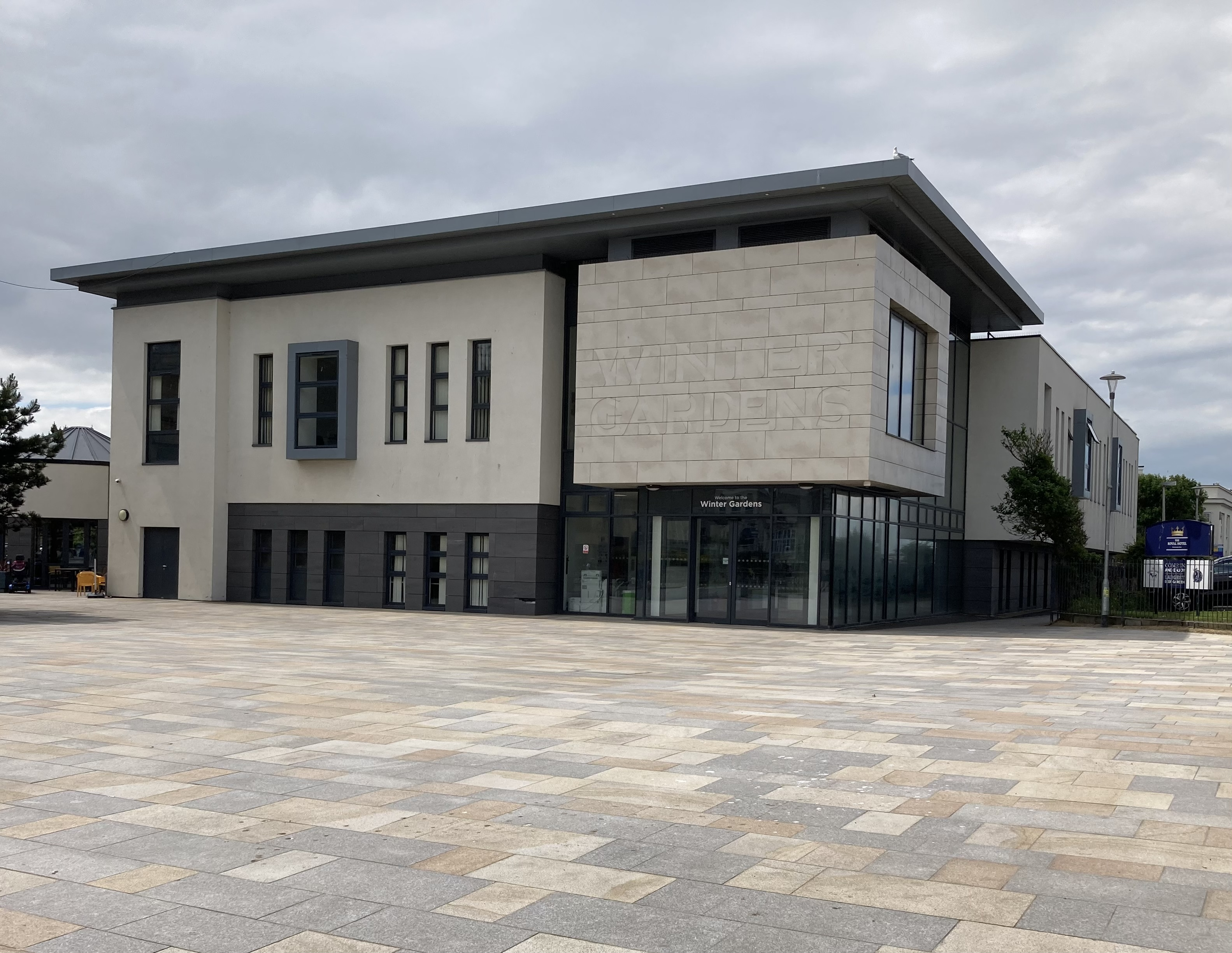
The Winter Gardens building

In 2016, Weston College re-branded its higher education provision to reflect its university centre status with UWE Bristol. The University Centre Weston brand was debuted on the hoarding surrounding the seafront section of the Winter Gardens Pavilion in August 2016.

=== Inspirational Events and Investments ===
In 2017, Weston College launched Inspirational Events and Investments, which consists of the Winter Gardens, Lauriston Hotel, Lasseter's restaurant, Florentine café, and also the Weston College Conference Centre.

=== Offender Learning Services Limited ===
In August 2012, Weston College won the south west offender learning provision contract from Strode College, and has since delivered offender learning to 13 prisons in the south west of England. Following prison closures across the country, the college now delivers to the following nine prisons: HM Prison Erlestoke, HM Prison The Verne, HM Prison Bristol, HM Prison Channings Wood, HM Prison Dartmoor, HM Prison Eastwood Park, HM Prison Exeter, HM Prison Leyhill and HM Prison Portland. In December 2018 it was announced that Weston College had won the contract to deliver education to a further 10 prisons across: Avon and South Dorset, Devon and North Dorset and Kent, Surrey and Sussex.

== Awards ==
Award	Awarding body	Year
Bristol Education Provider of the year	Bristol Life Awards	2018
Training Provider of the Year	Bristol and Bath Apprenticeship Awards	2018
Queen's Anniversary Prize for Higher and Further Education	The Royal Anniversary Trust	2017
Beacon Award for Learning Difficulties and Disabilities	The Association of Colleges	2017
Beacon Award for Widening Participation	The Association of Colleges	2017
Higher Education Quality Mark	Quality Assurance Agency for Higher Education	2016
Matrix Standard accreditation for advice and support services	Assessment Services Ltd	2015
Beacon Award for Careers Education and Guidance	The Association of Colleges	2015
Beacon Award the Effective Integration of Libraries/Learning Resources Centres in Curriculum Delivery	The Association of Colleges	2015
College of the Year	Times Educational Supplement	2015
Overall FE Provider of the Year	Times Educational Supplement	2015
Gold Award for staff development	Investors in People	2013
Sword of Honour	British Safety Council	2012
Building of the Year	Somerset Trust	2012
Beacon Award for Inclusive Practice	The Association of Colleges	2012
Champion status for staff development	Investors in People	2010
Crème de la Crème Business Award	Awards Intelligence	2010

== Notable alumni ==
- Geoff Barrow, songwriter for the band Portishead
- Sophie Long, journalist and BBC News presenter
- Nutty Noah, singer-songwriter
- George Shelley, former member of the band Union J
- Michelle Terry, actor and writer

These people studied as former schools which are now part of Weston College:

- Jill Dando, television presenter and journalist (at Broadoak Sixth Form, now the college's Loxton Campus)
- Alfred Leete, creator of the Lord Kitchener Wants You recruitment campaign (at the School of Science and Art)
