= University Centre Weston =

Coordinates: 51.350896°N 2.981486°W

- Established: 2016
- Parent institution: Weston College
- Affiliations: University of the West of England, Bath Spa University
- Principal: Pat Jones
- Students: 862
- Location: Weston-super-Mare, England
- Campus: Urban
- Website: www.ucw.ac.uk

University Centre Weston, also known as UCW, is a university centre based in the town of Weston-super-Mare, Somerset, England. The centre was formed by Weston College in 2016 following the college's announcement of university centre status with UWE Bristol and Bath Spa University in November 2015.

UCW is currently based at Weston College's Knightstone Campus, with some degree level provision based at its Knightstone, South West Skills and Loxton Campuses.

== History ==
Weston College has delivered higher education courses since 1993. The college expanded its degree-level provision and gained university centre status first with Bath Spa University in May 2014.

In November 2015, at Weston College's annual business breakfast, The college announced that it would further expand its university-level provision through university centre status with UWE Bristol. This partnership was further developed with the announcement of the creation of an Institute of Professional Education in July 2016.

UCW's new logo was debuted on the hoarding surrounding the seafront portion of Weston-super-Mare's Winter Gardens Pavilion, part of which will house the organisation when it is reopened in 2017.

The university centre scored 88% in the National Student Survey's 'overall satisfaction' survey, above the national average of 86%.

== Campuses ==
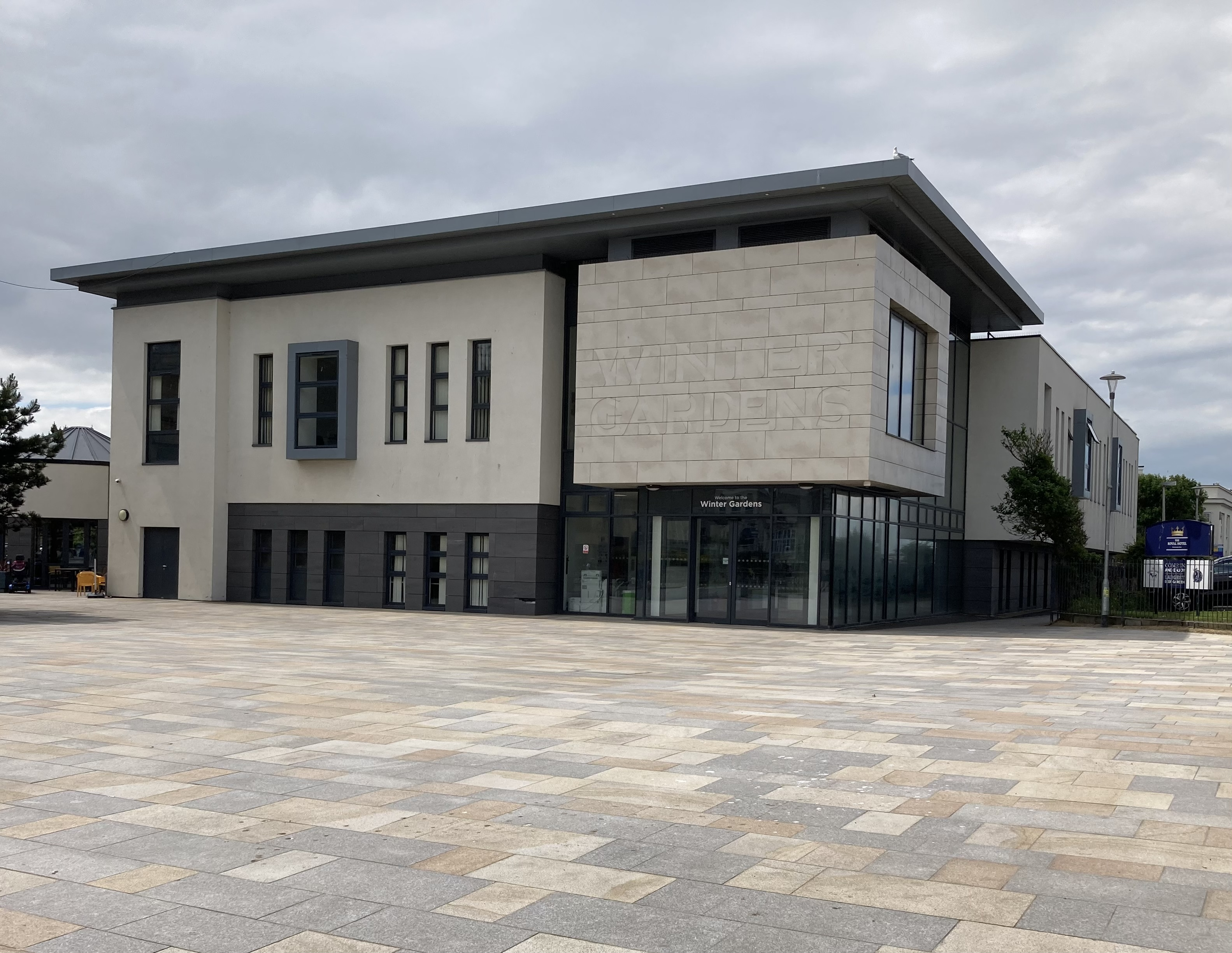
The Winter Gardens building, where many UCW courses are taught

UCW is primarily based at the Winter Gardens Campus. Courses are also taught on the 5th and 6th floors of the Weston College Knightstone Campus. Courses in specialised areas are also taught at Weston College’s Loxton and South West Skills Campuses.

== Courses ==
University Centre Weston runs many courses at levels 5 and 6 of the UK's National Qualifications Framework. It is the only educational establishment in North Somerset that provides higher level qualifications in engineering.

UCW has courses in the following subjects: animal, environment and biological studies, art, film, game and graphic design, business, accounting and operations, computing and digital technologies, counselling, healthcare, education and early years, engineering and construction, criminology, performance and production arts and music.

== Assessment ==
In 2023, over 80% of learners achieved First Class or 2:1 Degree. 95 per cent of UCW students progress to employment or further study within six months of graduating.

In 2025, UCW was rated above average in all nine areas of the National Student Survey, with UCW’s mental wellbeing services being rated at over 95%.

== Awards ==
- 2023 - Teaching Excellence Framework 'Gold'

In 2023, UCW was ranked among the best places to study at university level in the UK by the Teaching Excellence Framework. UCW stated when receiving this certification: “This achievement represents a significant milestone for our region, confirming the excellence of our institution for higher education. Furthermore, it underscores the Weston College Group’s positive impact on learners both locally and nationally.”

- 2017 - Teaching Excellence Framework 'Gold'
- 2016 - Quality Assurance Agency for Higher Education 'Quality Mark' for higher education.
