= Hornophone =

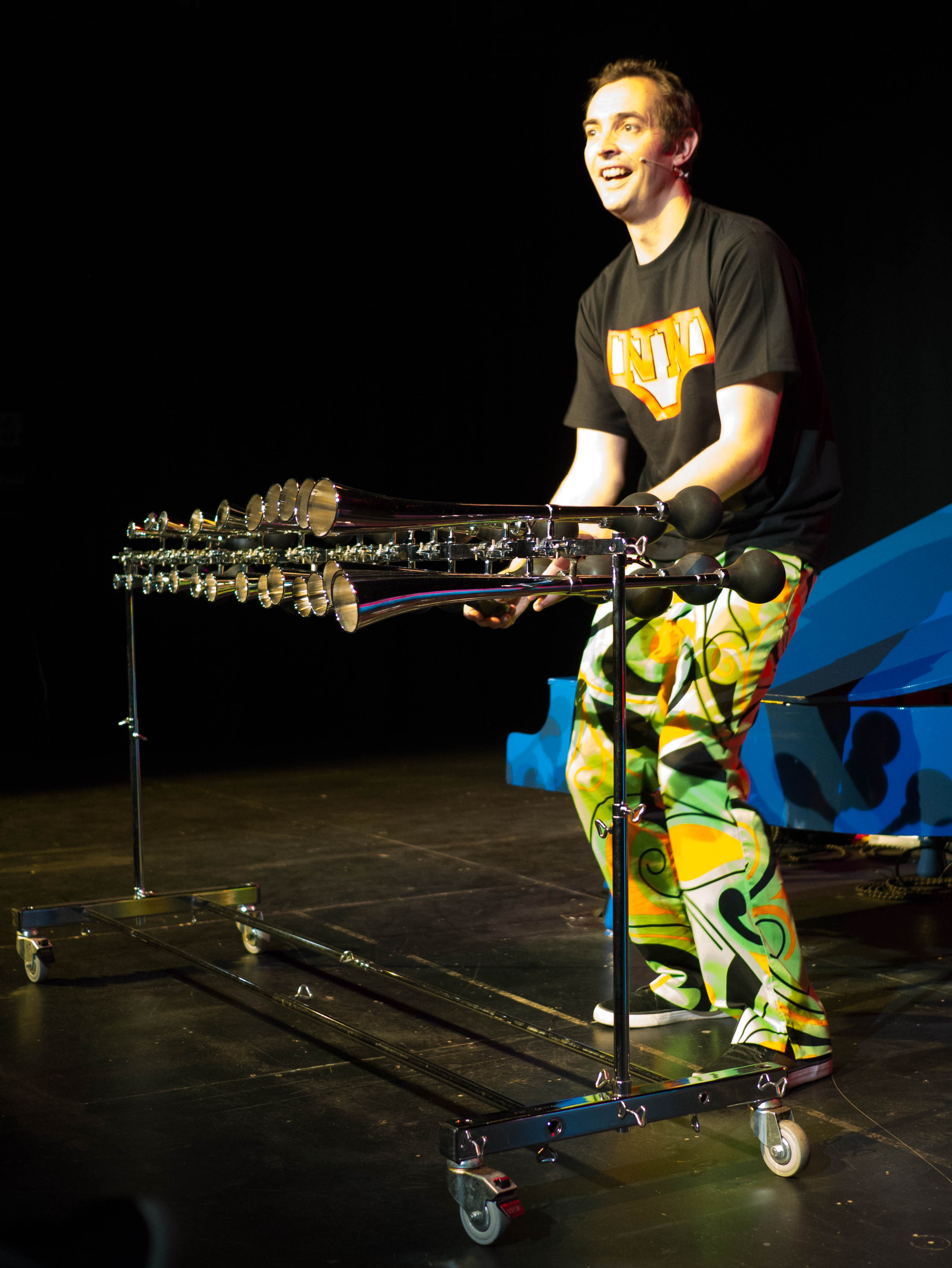
Nutty Noah playing the hornophone

The hornophone is a musical instrument composed of a number of bicycle horns clamped into a metal frame. The horns are tuned to the notes of a chromatic scale and arranged so that the bulbs form a musical keyboard, much like the bars of a xylophone or glockenspiel. The instrument is typically played standing, by squeezing the horn bulbs.

== History ==
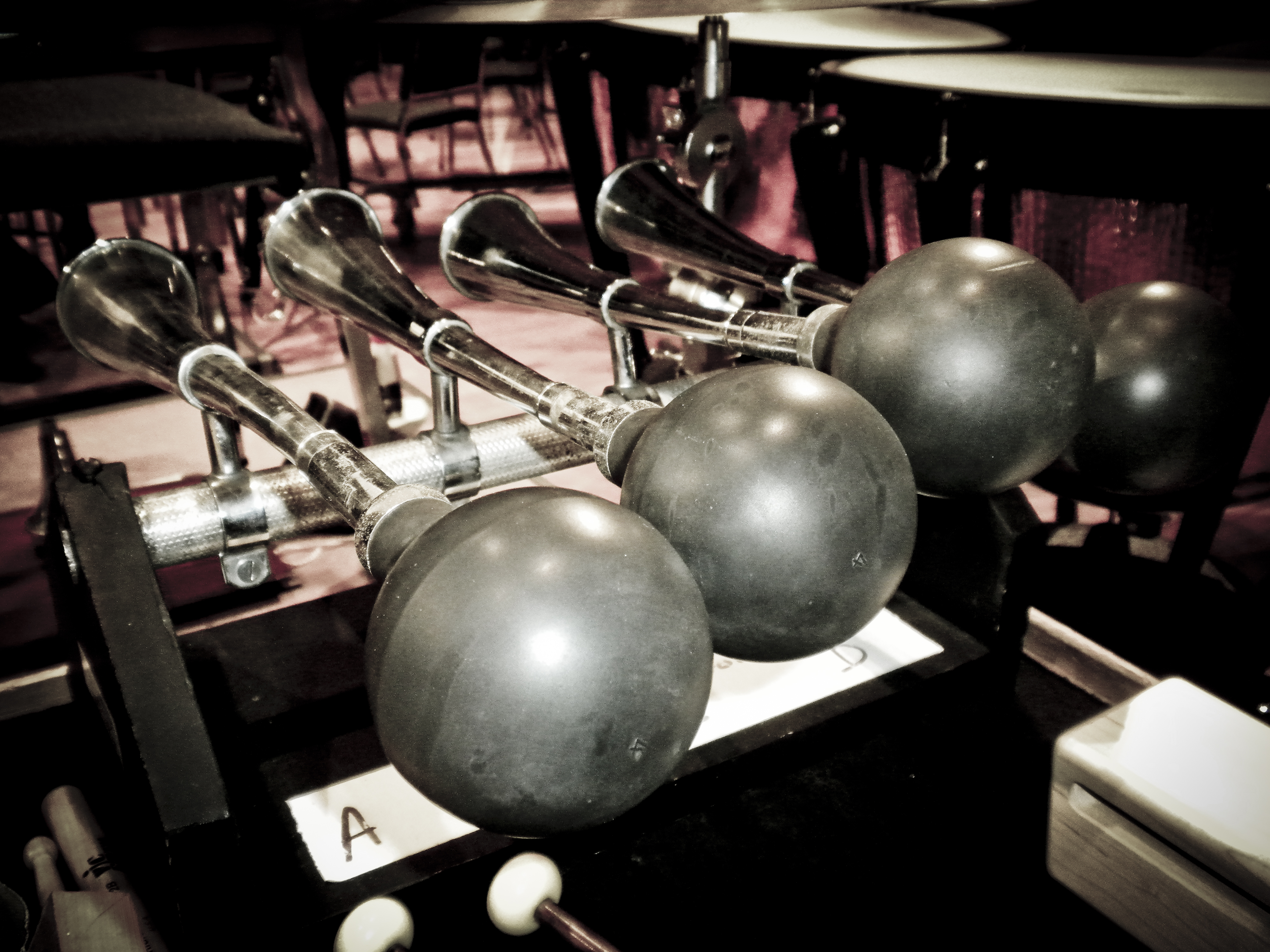
Taxi horns for Gershwin's An American in Paris

The instrument was anticipated in the 1920s as the two-octave "Horn Orchestra of Stanelli", built by British music hall performer Edward Stanley de Groot from 24 car horns. American composer George Gershwin, inspired by the sound of taxi horns when visiting France, included four in the orchestration of his 1928 tone poem An American in Paris. For his 1929 piece March of the Automobiles, American composer Henry Fillmore invented the similar klaxophone, built from 12 tuned klaxons. In the 1940s and 50s, band leader and drummer Spike Jones used many unusual instruments for comic effect, including sets of tuned car horns. Hungarian composer György Ligeti later included a chromatic set of 12 bulb horns in his 1977 opera, Le Grand Macabre.

== Known performers ==
In the 21st century, the hornophone continues to appear mainly in musical comedy acts, notably by British comedians Harry Hill, Nutty Noah, and Bill Bailey.
