= Heliogabalus imperator =

Orchestral work by Hans Werner Henze

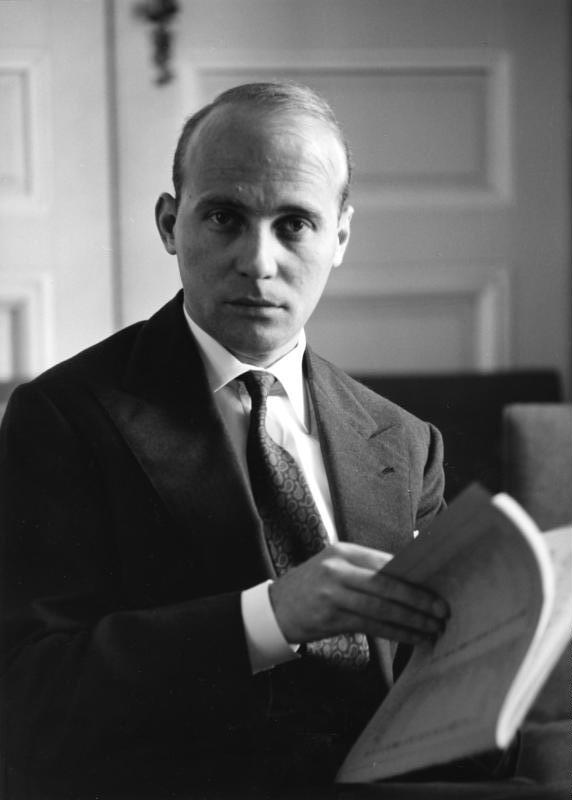
Hans Werner Henze in 1960

Heliogabalus imperator, allegoria per musica (Emperor Heliogabalus, allegory in music) is an orchestral work by the German composer Hans Werner Henze.

Composed in 1972 and revised in 1986, it is a "cinematic, circus-like" depiction of the brief, lurid reign of the teenage third-century Roman emperor Elagabalus. Henze's inspiration came not from historical records but from literature, notably Artaud's fictional biography Héliogabale and Stefan George's collection of poems, Algabal, lines from which preface the score:

Sieh ich bin zart wie eine apfelblüte
Und friedenfroher denn ein neues lamm.
Doch liegen eisen stein und feuer-schwamm
Gefährlich in erschüttertem gemüte — Stefan George, Algabal

A symphonic poem in all but name, the music is episodic in nature, depicting Heliogabalus's extravagant entry into Rome from his native Syria, as "ecstatic Arab children danced to the strident strains of barbarian music" at the head of the procession. Henze goes on to depict the overthrow of traditional morality with dynamic passages "producing all the noise, vulgarity, showiness and bestiality" of the regime, contrasting it with more reflective episodes depicting the young emperor alone, as "sun-god". The piece concludes with Heliogabalus's inevitable murder, the Praetorian guard depicted by brief snatches of German and American marches.

The work lasts for about 28 minutes, and is scored for a large orchestra, with a particularly wide range of percussion (requiring five players), including steel drum, tom-toms, four sets of tam-tams, a flexatone, whistles and an array of bells. It is dedicated to the Italian fellow composer Luigi Nono and to the Chilean poet Gaston Salvatore. The work was premièred by the Chicago Symphony Orchestra under Georg Solti on 16 November 1972. When Henze was later preparing the work to conduct himself, he removed what he described as "clumsy" aleatoric passages. This revision was published in 1986, and given its première on 28 June 1989 at the Villa Massimo, Rome by the RAI National Symphony Orchestra under Eberhard Kloke.

The première of Heliogabalus imperator was recorded, however it was not until 2019 that a commercial recording was issued, by Wergo Records. This was a transfer of a radio broadcast from 2014, made at the Maida Vale Studios in London by the BBC Symphony Orchestra conducted by Oliver Knussen.
