= Klaxophone =

Musical instrument

- Classification: aerophone

Related instruments
- hornophone

The Klaxophone is a musical instrument created by American composer Henry Fillmore. Composed of twelve car horns, it was created for use in his march The Klaxon: March of the Automobiles, which was composed in 1929 for the 1930 Cincinnati Automobile Show. This piece featured the instrument mounted onto a table and powered by a car battery.

The Klaxophone is tuned to play along with a big band, presumably in the Trio and Break strain.
