= Winter Gardens Pavilion, Weston-super-Mare =

Winter Gardens Pavilion
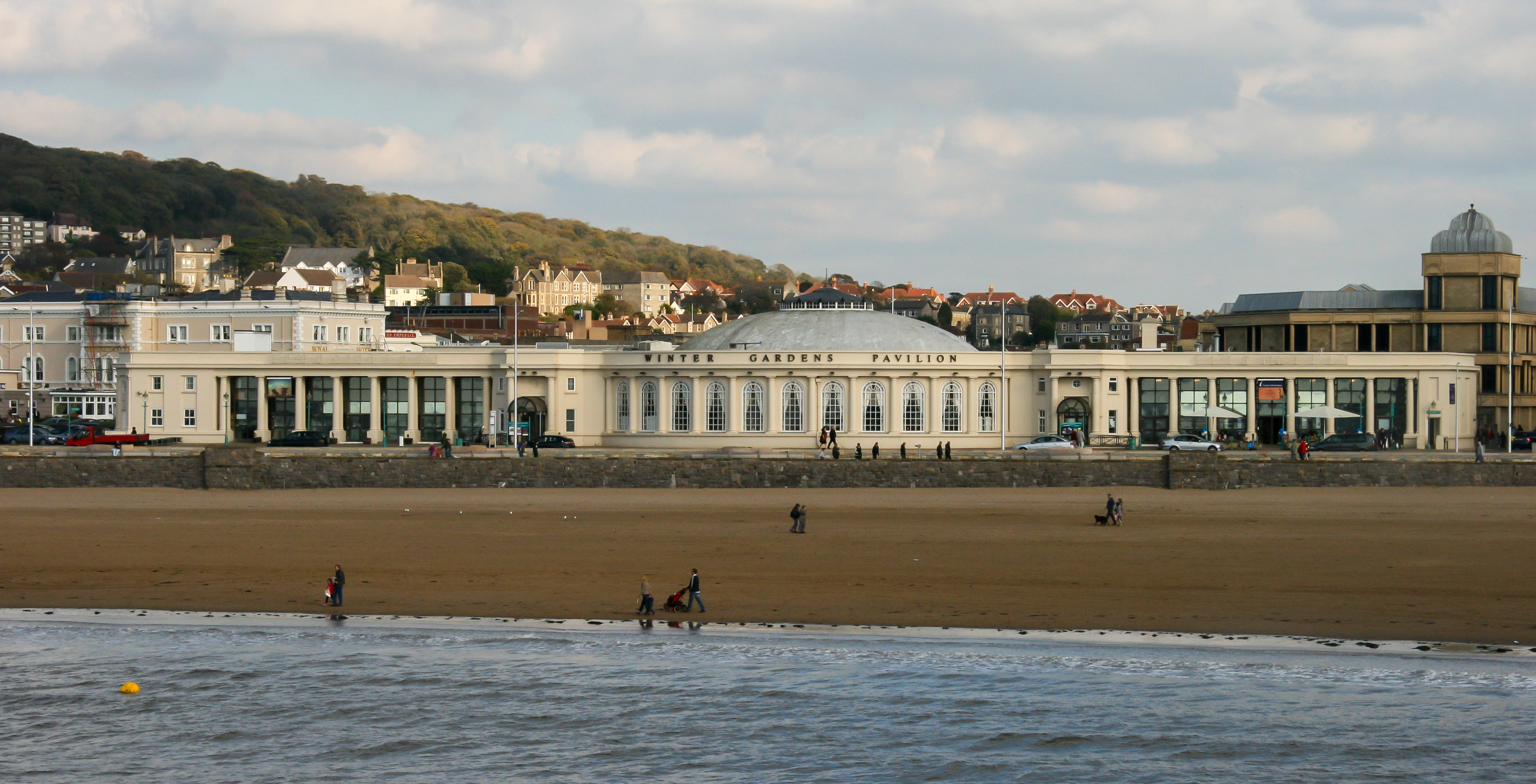
- View of the Winter Gardens' west facade
- Interactive map of the Winter Gardens Pavilion area

General information
- Type: Pavilion
- Architectural style: neo-Georgian
- Location: Royal Parade, Weston-super-Mare, United Kingdom
- Coordinates: 51.3495°N 2.9818°W
- Construction started: 1925
- Completed: 1927
- Renovated: 1945 onwards
- Owner: Weston College

Design and construction
- Architects: Thomas Hayton Mawson, Harry Brown

Website
- www.westonwintergardens.co.uk

The Winter Gardens Pavilion is a neo-Georgian pavilion located in the English seaside town of Weston-super-Mare. The pavilion was originally completed in 1927 and included extensive gardens, a tennis court and a putting green. Much of the gardens are now covered by the nearby Sovereign Shopping Centre and the garden's eastern wall forms the boundary of the town square.

== History ==
The idea of creating a Winter Gardens Pavilion in Weston-super-Mare dates back to at least 1881. Due to restrictive covenants on a plot of seafront land named Roger's Field, on which the Winter Gardens now stands, the town's first Summer and Winter Gardens complex was opened on the Boulevard. These buildings were destroyed by bombing on 28 June 1942. The use of Roger's Field as a potential site for a ballroom and indoor event venue was discussed by the Town Advertising Association in 1914, however the outbreak of the First World War postponed the development.

In 1922, the Urban District Council purchased Roger's Field by compulsory purchase order at a cost of £2,640 with the intention of creating an ‘Old English Garden’. Henry Butt, of the former Weston-super-Mare quarry, gifted the town council money to cover the sale in 1925. On 15 September 1923, the town council discussed plans to create rose gardens, terraces and shelters on the plot of land, but the scheme was deemed to be too unambitious and did not meet the town's need for a venue which could be used for entertainment during the autumn and winter months.

The current Winter Gardens Pavilion was designed in 1924 in a collaboration between landscape architect Thomas Hayton Mawson and town surveyor Harry Brown. A height restriction imposed by a covenant relating to the nearby Royal Hotel compromised the design and resulted in a sunken ballroom and a small domed roof.

During the Second World War, Weston-super-Mare was hit heavily by Luftwaffe bombing, and it has been reported, without direct evidence, that the Winter Gardens may have been damaged. The current building has been subjected to substantial internal alterations following the war, including the removal of the original structure and much of the original detail and character.

A wall incorporating the columns at the front of the pavilion was built in 1950 to create a cafe. In 1963, the Starlight Room was constructed at the rear of the building. In the 1970s, the wings on either side of the ballroom were glazed, and a mezzanine floor was added. Further redevelopment was undertaken in 1989, which included an extensive rear extension over the footprint of the Starlight Room and the tennis courts, the creation of a new main entrance, reception facilities and the Prince Consort Hall. The 1980s developments removed much of the original character of the gardens designed by Mawson.

In 1981, it was reported that the Winter Gardens cost the council £1,000 per week to run and was losing £80,000 per year (£276,610.16 adjusted for inflation) At a meeting held at Weston College, attended by 200 members of the public, options were discussed concerning the Winter Gardens' future - including the proposed demolition of all or part of the building. Other ideas included building a seven-storey hotel on the site of the pavilion or keeping the Winter Gardens and developing part of the Italian Gardens to extend the High Street. Over 7,000 people signed a petition to save the building, and it was decided that the council should pay the deficit using a percentage of the council's tax rates.

In 2013, it was reported that the venue's running costs had continued to rise, and the building was operating at a loss of over £30,000 per month. North Somerset Council approached the college in 2014 with the prospect of transferring the building to the college to further its expansion as part of a wider plan to regenerate the town's centre.

The building was reopened in September 2017 following the refurbishment.

== Redevelopment by Weston College ==
In January 2015, North Somerset Council agreed to sell Weston-super-Mare's Winter Gardens Pavilion to Weston College for the nominal fee of £1. The sale was part of the council's plan to regenerate Weston-super-Mare's town centre and the college intend to turn the 1989 extension into a law and professional services academy. The historic western façade was restored and kept open for community use.

Prior to the transfer announcement, around half of the events held at the Winter Gardens were either led by or involved Weston College, including the largest events held in the venue; the annual academic conference and the celebration of success.

A campaign was then started to get the building listed by English Heritage, but the application was declined in April 2015. Catherine Gibbons, a town Councillor, announced in September 2015 that she would attempt to have parts of the building protected for community use under the Localism Act 2011, but the listing was rejected by the council.

On 14 October 2015, the planning application for the Law and Professional Services Academy was debated by North Somerset Council's planning and regulatory committee. During the meeting, Weston College, the Weston Mercury and the Bristol Post reported that the application had been approved.

The building was transferred to the college in May 2016, and contractors moved onto site in June.

Proposals for the Winter Gardens' redevelopment preserved the historic 1920s portion of the building for public use, and included the refurbishment of the ballroom and kitchen. The restaurant was moved from the northern to the southern wing and the main entrance was moved from the rear of the building to the north wing. The cafe that borders the Italian Gardens was retained and refurbished.

The development saw the building divided into two sections, with a Law and Professional Services Academy and higher education teaching spaces accessed from the Italian Gardens and the Winter Gardens Pavilion accessed from the seafront. A barrier was put in place to further separate the two.

The development was completed in September 2017, for the start of the academic year. The restaurant 'Lasseter's' was opened in October 2017.

== In popular culture ==
The Winter Gardens has been used to host concerts, shows, exhibitions and conferences.

In the 1950s, it featured in episodes of the BBC show Come Dancing. In the 1960s, artists such as Gene Vincent, Cilla Black, Pink Floyd played at the venue. In the 1970s it hosted performances by artists such as David Bowie, Deep Purple, Slade, Mott the Hoople and T. Rex.

The last scenes of The Remains of the Day, a James Ivory film of 1993, were shot at locations in the town including the Grand Pier and the Winter Gardens.
