= Boomwhacker =

Plastic tube tuned to a musical pitch

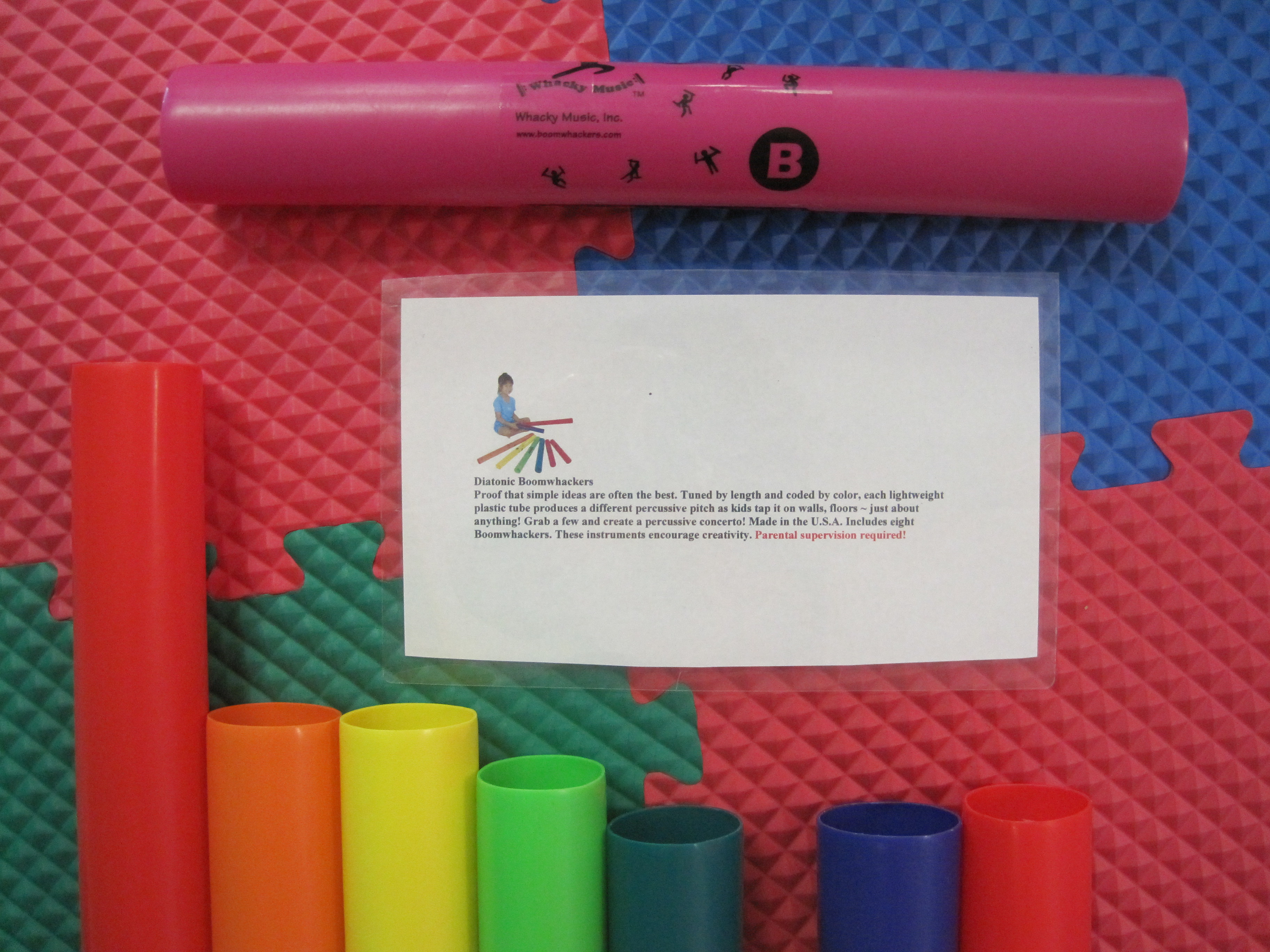

Percussion instrument
- Classification: Percussion
- Hornbostel–Sachs classification: 413, 111.232 (The sound is produced by the vibration of air inside the tube, The sound is produced by striking a rigid, tube-shaped body.)
- Inventor: Craig Ramsell
- Developed: 1994

Playing range
- C2G5

Related instruments
- Physics; Education; Community building

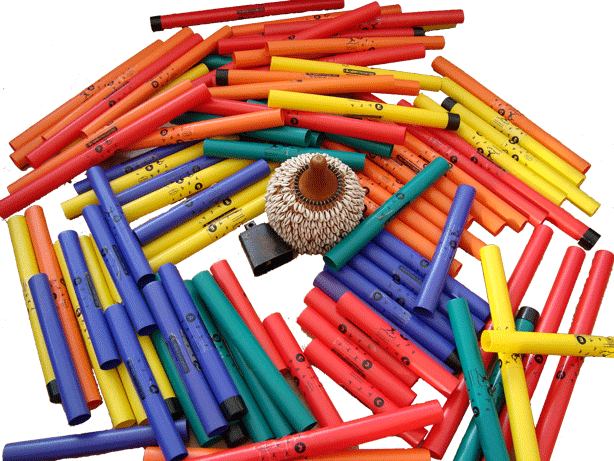
A large pile of pentatonic Boomwhackers

A Boomwhacker is a percussion instrument in the plosive aerophone and idiophone family. They are lightweight, hollow, color-coded, plastic tubes, tuned to a musical pitch by length. They were first produced by Craig Ramsell through his company Whacky Music in 1995. The term is now a registered trademark by Rhythm Band Instruments.

== History ==
Boomwhackers evolved at a time when junk bands and performers using instruments made from recycled materials were popular. Bands often used gas pipes or various cast-offs from plumbers that were cut to length to produce different pitches when struck on an open end. Schools, meanwhile, created their own junk bands as a cheap way to simultaneously promote creativity and encourage recycling. However, creating a custom kit was labor-intensive, leaving a niche for Boomwhackers, which are premade and mass-produced.

American Craig Ramsell reportedly came up with the idea for his Boomwhackers in 1994 while at home recovering from radiation therapy. While cutting cardboard tubes into shorter lengths for recycling, he noticed the different pitches resulting from the different lengths and decided to investigate their creative potential. He experimented with various plastics before settling on plastic mailing tubes. He and his wife, Monnie Ramsell, formed DrumSpirit as a sole proprietorship to market the tubes. The original plastic Boomwhackers were first produced in 1995. The current, more durable version was released in 1997.

Craig Ramsell then started Whacky Music, Inc. in 1998, marketing a wider variety of Boomwhacker sets and materials. Boomwhackers are now available to span 3½ chromatic octaves. (The addition of the Octavator Tube Caps in 1999 allowed for the third lower octave.)

In July 2009, the Sedona, Arizona-based Whacky Music, Inc., sold its interests to Rhythm Band Instruments LLC of Fort Worth, Texas, through an asset purchase agreement. Rhythm Band now distributes and owns the trademark to Boomwhackers.

== Sound production ==
Boomwhackers produce musical tones through vibrations in the instrument when struck. The pitch of the instrument is determined by the length of the tube. The longer a tube is, the lower its pitch; the shorter a tube is, the higher the pitch. When one end of a Boomwhackers tube is covered with what the manufacturer calls an "Octavator Cap", the pitch it produces is lowered by an octave. They are most commonly hit with a hand, against the floor, or on other parts of the human body. They can also be grouped together and struck with mallets in different configurations using specialized holders (either homemade or available from the manufacturer), similar to a horizontally-aligned xylophone.

== Usage ==
Boomwhackers are most commonly used in elementary music classrooms as an inexpensive alternative or supplement to traditional pitched instruments such as xylophones and metallophones. Students are usually given a distinctly pitched tube, such as F♯ or A. Educators then instruct players of certain pitches to strike the Boomwhacker at a precise time, forming a melody. Boomwhackers are often used by performance artists and other musical performance groups to add an element of spectacle. They can also be used by people with intellectual and developmental impairment to develop sensorimotor skills, social skills, and creativity.
