= List of quarter tone pieces =

A selection of compositions using quarter tones:

== A ==
- Thomas Adès
  - Asyla calls for an upright piano tuned a quarter-tone flat.

== B ==
- Jan Bach
  - Concert Variations for solo euphonium; "each variation is based on different performance techniques of the instrument, including quarter-tones"
- János Bali
  - Aiolos ajándéka (Gift of Aiolos) for violin, viola da gamba (tuned 1/4 tone lower), harpsichord (upper manual tuned 1/4 tone lower)
- Clarence Barlow
  - Çoǧluotobüsişletmesi for four pianos. "in which four of the 12 pitches of the chromatic scale are tuned a quarter tone flat"
  - ...until' version 7 for guitar (1980).
- Hans Barth
  - Concerto for Quarter Tone Piano and Quarter Tone Strings (1930)
- Béla Bartók
  - String Quartet No. 6; the third movement Burletta contains quarter-tone tuning used for parodistic effect. Quarter tones are also used in Bartók's ballet The Miraculous Mandarin.
  - Sonata for Solo Violin; the fourth movement Presto contains quarter-tones, but they are not "structural features." This movement also calls for third-tones.
  - Violin Concerto No. 2; the cadenza in the first movement requires the use of quarter-tones, but only as an effect.
- John Beckwith
  - Blurred Lines for violin and harpsichord (1997)
- Jack Behrens
  - Quarter-Tone Quartet, Op. 20.
- Alban Berg
  - Chamber Concerto, for violin, piano, and 13 winds.
- Luciano Berio
  - E vó (1972).
- Easley Blackwood Jr.
  - Twelve Microtonal Etudes for Electronic Music Media: "24 Notes: Moderato" (1980).
- Ernest Bloch
  - Piano Quintet No. 1 (1923); the first movement features use of quarter-tones in the string parts.
- Pierre Boulez
  - Polyphonie X (1951).
  - Le Visage nuptial (1946).

== C ==
- Julián Carrillo
  - Capricho for piano in quarter-tones (1959)
  - Capricho for solo viola in quarter-tones (1926)
  - Casi-sonatas 1–6 for solo violin, viola or cello in quarter-tones (c.1960s)
  - Concertino in quarter-, eighth- and sixteenth-tones for violin, cello and harp with orchestra (1926)
  - Concerto for 1/4-tone and 1/8-tone cello and orchestra (1958)
  - Concerto No. 1 for quarter-tone violin and orchestra (1963)
  - Concerto No. 2 for quarter-tone violin and orchestra (1964)
  - Mass for Pope John XXIII for male chorus in quarter-tones (1920s)
  - Preludio a Colón for vocalizing soprano, octavina (modified bass guitar, in 8th tones), flute, 16th-tone harp, violin, and guitar (1922)
  - Serenata for cello in quarter-tones with English horn, harp, and string quartet (1927)
  - 70 estudios for solo violin in quarter-tones (c. 1927?) {also for solo viola, cello, or double-bass}
  - Sonata for solo guitar in quarter-tones (c.1924)
  - Sonata (Amanecer en Berlin 13) for solo harp in quarter-tones (1931)
  - Sonata casi fantasia for violin, violoncello and guitar in quarter-, eighth- and sixteenth-tones (1925)
  - String Quartet in quarter-tones (c.1924) {There are also 7 others with some using smaller intervals.}
  - Suite for solo guitar in quarter-tones (1960)
  - 3 estudios en forma de sonatina for solo violin in quarter-tones (1927)
  - Symphony No. 1 (Colombia) for orchestra in quarter-tones (c.1924)
  - Symphony No. 2 (Colombia) for orchestra in quarter-tones (1926)
- Dragutin Čolić
  - Concertino for quarter-tone piano and string sextet (1932)
  - String Quartet No. 1 (1932)
- Jacob Collier
  - In the Bleak Midwinter for 10 Vocalists (2016)
- Aaron Copland
  - Vitebsk (1928).
- John Corigliano
  - Chiaroscuro for two pianos tuned a quarter tone apart (1997)
- Mildred Couper
  - Xanadu for two pianos tuned a quarter tone apart (ca. 1930)
  - Dirge for two pianos tuned a quarter tone apart, published in New Music quarterly (January 1937)
  - Rumba for two pianos tuned a quarter tone apart (ca. 1937)

== D ==
- Jean-Jacques Débillemont
  - Vercingétorix, cantata (1863, lost)
- John Diercks
  - Reminiscences, 1971 for two pianos, one tuned a quarter-tone lower.

== E ==
- John Eaton
  - Sonority Movement, for flute and nine harps.
- Danny Elfman
  - Soundtrack score for A Simple Plan features "very specific quarter tone detunings coming off the Emulator".
- Don Ellis
  - Electric Bath
- George Enescu
  - Œdipe (opera)
  - Third Violin Sonata ("In Popular Romanian Style")

== F ==
- Bjørn Fongaard
  - Galaxe [Galaxy] (for three quarter-tone guitars), Opus 46.
- John Foulds
  - Cello Sonata (1905, rev. 1927), passages in the second movement

== G ==
- Sofia Gubaidulina
  - Quaternion for cello quartet, two of the cellos are tuned down a quarter tone
  - Music for Flute, Strings, and Percussion, the strings are divided into two sections, one of which is tuned a quarter-tone lower than the other.

== H ==
- Sampo Haapamäki
  - Velinikka, concerto for quarter-tone accordion (2008)
  - Conception, double concerto for quarter-tone guitar, quarter-tone accordion and orchestra (2012)
  - Quarter-Tone Piano Concerto (2017)
- Georg Friedrich Haas
  - 3 Hommages, for piano player on two pianos tuned a quarter tone apart
    - "Hommage à Steve Reich" (1982)
    - "Hommage à György Ligeti" (1984)
    - "Hommage à Josef Matthias Hauer" (1982)
- Alois Hába
  - Children's Play for unaccompanied youth chorus, Op.43 (1932)
  - Chor-Suite for unaccompanied chorus, Op. 13 (1922)
  - 5 Choruses for unaccompanied youth chorus, Op. 42 (1932)
  - 5 Mixed Choruses, Op. 44 (1932)
  - Detské nálady (Children's Moods), 8-song cycle for mid-ranged voice and quartertone guitar, Op.51 (1943)
  - Fantasy No. 1 for quartertone piano, Op. 17 (1923)
  - Fantasy No. 2 for quartertone piano, Op. 19 (1924)
  - Fantasy No. 3 for quartertone piano, Op. 20 (1924)
  - Fantasy No. 4 for quartertone piano, Op. 25 (1925)
  - Fantasy No. 5 for quartertone piano, Op. 26 (1925)
  - Fantasy No. 6 for quartertone piano, Op. 27 (1926)
  - Fantasy No. 7 for quartertone piano, Op. 28 (1926)
  - Fantasy No. 8 for quartertone piano, Op. 29 (1926)
  - Fantasy No. 9 for quartertone piano, Op. 30 (1926)
  - Fantasy No. 10 for quartertone piano, Op. 31 (1926)
  - Fantasy No. 11 for quartertone piano, Op. 89 (1959)
  - Fantasy for unaccompanied violin, Op. 9a (1921)
  - Fantasy for unaccompanied violoncello, Op. 18 (1924)
  - Fantasy for violin and quartertone piano, Op. 21 (1925)
  - Fantasy for viola and quartertone piano, Op. 32 (1926)
  - Fantasy for violoncello and quartertone piano, Op. 33 (1927)
  - Já (I) for unaccompanied men's chorus, Op. 36 (1928)
  - Matka (The Mother), quartertone opera in 10 scenes, Op. 35 (1927–29)
  - Poesie zivota (Poetry of Life), 12-song cycle for soprano and quartertone guitar, Op. 53 (1943)
  - Pracující den (The working day) for unaccompanied male voices, Op. 45 (1932)
  - Solo for violin Op. 93 (1961–62)
  - Sonata for quartertone piano, Op. 62 (1946–47)
  - String Quartet No. 2 ("In quarter-tone system"), Op. 7 (1920)
  - String Quartet 3 ("In quarter-tone system"), Op. 12 (1922)
  - String Quartet 4 ("In quarter-tone system"), Op. 14 (1922)
  - String Quartet 6 ("In quarter-tone system"), Op. 70 (1950)
  - String Quartet No. 12 ("In quarter-tone system"), Op. 90 (1959–60)
  - String Quartet 14 ("In quarter-tone system"), Op. 94 (1963)
  - Suite No. 1 for quartertone piano, Op. 10 (1922, revised in 1932 as Op. 11a)
  - Suite No. 2 for quartertone piano, Op. 11 (1922, revised in 1932 as Op. 11b)
  - Suite No. 3 for quartertone piano, Op. 16 (1923)
  - Suite No. 4 for quartertone piano, Op. 22 (1924)
  - Suite No. 5 for quartertone piano, Op. 23 (1925)
  - Suite No. 6 for quartertone piano, Op. 88 (1957–59)
  - Suite for clarinet and quartertone piano, Op. 24 (1925)
  - 1st Suite for quartertone guitar, Op. 54 (1943)
  - 2nd Suite for quartertone guitar, Op. 63 (1947)
  - Suite for clarinet (unaccompanied), Op. 55 (1943)
  - Suite for quartertone trumpet and trombone, Op. 56 (1944)
  - Suite in quartertones for 4 trombones, Op. 72 (1950)
- Fromental Halévy
  - Prométhée enchaîné (1849)
- Jonathan Harvey
  - Valley of Aosta for chamber ensemble of 13 players and electronics (1988)
- Lejaren Hiller
  - String Quartet No. 5 (1962).
- Alan Hovhaness
  - O Lord, Bless Thy Mountains, Op. 276, for two pianos tuned a quarter tone apart (1974)

== I ==
- Charles Ives
  - Three Quarter-Tone Pieces, for two pianos, one tuned a quarter-tone sharp, S. 128 (K. 3C3) (1923–24)
  - Symphony No. 4 (1910–1924)

== K ==
- Jeronimas Kačinskas
  - String Quartet No. 2 (1931) (lost? withdrawn?)
  - Trio for trumpet, viola, and harmonium (1933)
- Gideon Klein
  - Duo for violin and viola in the Quartertone System (1940)
- György Kurtág
  - Lebenslauf, Op. 32 (1992)

== L ==
- Dongryul Lee
  - Goethe’s Garden (2016-2017) for two pianos tuned a quarter-tone apart
- Michael A. Levine
  - Divination by Mirrors for Saw and Strings. Strings are divided into two groups of 13 tuned 1/4 step apart. Each group plays only in its own pitch "universe". The featured bowed saw freely moves from standard tuning to pitches a 1/4 step away. Premiered at Merkin Concert Hall, New York City, 1998 by the New York Virtuosi and Dale Stuckenbruck saw soloist.
- György Ligeti
  - Clocks and Clouds for 12-voiced women's choir and orchestra.
  - Quartet No. 2 for strings.
  - Ramifications for 12 solo strings (1968–69), divided into two groups tuned a quarter-tone apart.
- Arthur Lourié
  - Prelude for piano "with higher chromatism", Op.12 No.2 (1912).
- Alain Louvier
  - Anneaux de Lumière (1983) for two pianos, one tuned a quarter-tone apart (1 player)

== M ==
- Drake Mabry
  - Street Cries (11.10.83) for solo B♭ clarinet features extensive use of quarter tones in all three movements.
- Henry Mancini
  - Soundtrack score for Wait Until Dark (1967) features extensive use of quarter-tones including two pianos tuned a quarter-tone apart
  - The Night Visitor
- Steve Mackey
  - Indigenous Instruments
  - On All Fours
- Andrew March
  - Aeolian Rustling (2001) for alto flute (Boehm system) and harp, with Kingma System alto flute ossia.
  - XXIX—in Perpetuum (2001) for solo Kingma System quarter-tone alto flute.
  - Water Lilies (2001) for solo alto flute and harp, with Kingma System quarter-tone alto flute ossia.
  - Memoriam (2002) for Kingma System quarter-tone alto flute, vibraphone, marimba, harp and strings.
- Rytis Mažulis
  - Quartertone Canon for two piano tuned a quarter-tone apart (2010)
  - Sans Pause for string quartet (2001)
- Olivier Messiaen
  - Deux monodies en quarts de ton (1938).

== N ==
- Per Nørgård
  - String Quartet No. 5 'Inscape' (1969)

== O ==
- Frank J. Oteri
  - circles mostly in wood, a quarter-tone wind quintet in five movements (2002)
  - Fair and Balanced?, a quarter-tone saxophone quartet in four short movements (2004)

== P ==
- Krzysztof Penderecki
  - Threnody to the Victims of Hiroshima, for string orchestra, frequently makes use of quarter tones.

== R ==
- Karel Reiner
  - Fantasy for quarter-tone piano (1935-36)
  - Five songs for voice with violin accompaniment in quarter-tones to texts by Karel Hynek Mácha (1936, performed at the 1938 ISCM Festival in Paris)
  - 3 Duos for 2 quarter-tone clarinets (1972)
  - Suite for quarter-tone piano (1935-36)
- Milan Ristić
  - Duo for violin and violoncello, Op. 11 (1938)
  - Septet for clarinet, 2 trombones, string trio, and doublebass, Op. 9 (1938)
  - Suite for unaccompanied violin, Op. 6 (1938)
  - Suite for ten strings, Op. 10 (1938)
  - Suite for four trombones, Op. 8 (1938, scheduled for performance during the 1939 ISCM Festival in Warsaw but the performance could not take place)

== S ==
- Ezra Sims
  - String Quartet No. 3 (1962)
- Richard Heinrich Stein
  - Zwei Konzertstücke, Op. 26, 1906.
- Karlheinz Stockhausen
  - Pietà, for soprano, quarter-tone flugelhorn, and electronic music, from the opera Dienstag aus Licht
  - Schlagquartett, for piano and 3 x 2 timpani (1952)
- Billy Strange
  - These Boots Are Made for Walkin', 1966 popular song, sung by Nancy Sinatra, with a prominent quarter tone double bass riff.

== T ==
- Tōru Takemitsu
  - Bryce (1976).
- James Tenney
  - Bridge for two pianos tuned a quarter-tone apart (1984)
- Jukka Tiensuu
  - Kymmari for Decacorde (2016)
  - Anomal Dances Concerto for quarter-tone accordion and orchestra (2015)
  - Kuuhiomo a proludi in quarter tones for any ensemble of melody instruments (2015)
  - Arsenic and Old Lace for micro-tonally tuned harpsichord, string quartet (1990)
  - Narcissus for oboe and tape (1979)
- Tui St. George Tucker
  - Amoroso for solo clarinet
  - Indian Summer for 2 baritones with 2 flutes, clarinet, bassoon, trombone, viola, and percussion
  - Little Pieces for quarter-tone piano
  - My Melancholy Baby Fantasy for one player performing on two pianos at a right angle tuned a quarter-tone apart
  - Quartertone Carol for recorder trio
  - Quartertone Recorder Duets
  - Quartertone Lullubies 1–3 for recorder trio
  - Romanza for solo recorder.
  - Sarabande: Dance for Miriam Cooper, for microtonal harpsichord (1986)
  - Sonata No. 1 for Solo Recorder ("The Bullfinch").

== W ==
- Craig Walsh
  - String Quartet No. 1 "Ganga" (2010)
- Ivan Wyschnegradsky
  - Ainsi Parlait Zarathoustra, for four pianos two of which are tuned a quarter-tone sharp, Op. 17 (1929–1930, revised 1936)
  - 2 Chants sur Nietzsche, for baritone & 2 pianos in quarter tones, Op. 9 (1923)
  - Chant douloureux et étude, for violin and piano, Op. 6 (1918)
  - Composition, for string quartet, Op. 43 (1960)
  - Cosmos, for 4 pianos in quarter tones, Op. 28 (1939–1940)
  - Dialogue, for two pianos tuned a quarter-tone apart, eight hands, W.o.O. (1959)
  - Dithyrambe, for two pianos tuned a quarter-tone apart, Op. 12 (1923–1924)
  - Études sur les mouvements rotatoires, for two pianos tuned a quarter-tone apart, eight hands, Op. 45a.; for chamber orchestra, Op. 45c (1961)
  - Études sur les densités et les volumes, for two pianos tuned a quarter-tone apart, Op. 39b (1956)
  - Fragment symphonique No. 1, for four pianos two of which are tuned a quarter-tone sharp, Op. 23a; for orchestra, Op. 23c (1934, orch. vers. 1967)
  - Fragment symphonique No. 2, for four pianos two of which are tuned a quarter-tone sharp, timpani & percussions, Op. 24 (1937)
  - Fragment symphonique No. 3, for four pianos two of which are tuned a quarter-tone sharp & ad. lib. percussions, Op. 31 (1946)
  - Prélude et Fugue, Op. 21, for two pianos tuned a quarter-tone apart (1932)
  - Préludes dans tous les tons de l'échelle chromatique diatonisée à 13 sons, Op. 22, for two pianos tuned a quarter-tone apart (1934, revised 1960)
  - String Quartet No. 1, Op. 13 (1923–1924)
  - String Quartet No. 2, Op. 18 (1930–1931)
  - String Trio, Op. 53 (1979, unfinished, completed by Claude Ballif)
  - Variations sans thème et conclusion (five), for orchestra, Op. 33 (1951–52)

== Y ==
- Eugène Ysaÿe
  - Six Sonatas for Solo Violin, Op. 27 (1924), Nos. 3 and 5

== Notes ==
=== References ===
- Anon. 1997. Schwann Opus. 8 (2). p. 921.
- Anon. 2001. [untitled?]. International Record Review 2.
- Anon. 2007. [untitled ]. BBC Music Magazine 15, nos. 7–13:.
- Anon. 2011. "Elektrofoni: Works For Micro Intervallic Guitar 1965–1978: Bjørn Fongaard" (CD track listing). AllMusic (Accessed 15 November 2011).
- Anon. 2015. "Who We Are". NewMusicBox (accessed 28 May 2015).
- Bayley, Amanda. 2001. The Cambridge Companion to Bartók. Cambridge and New York: Cambridge University Press. ISBN 978-0-521-66958-0.
- Benedetti, Robert, Michael Brown, Bernie Laramie, and Patrick Williams. 2004. Creative Postproduction. Boston: Pearson Education. ISBN 978-0-205-37575-2.
- Benson, David J. 2007. Music: A Mathematical Offering. Cambridge and New York: Cambridge University Press, ISBN 978-0-521-85387-3.
- Bentoiu, Pascal. 2010. Masterworks of George Enescu: A Detailed Analysis, translated by Lory Wallfisch. Lanham, Maryland: Scarecrow Press. ISBN 978-0-8108-7665-1 (cloth) ISBN 978-0-8108-7690-3 (ebook).
- Borchert, Gavin. 2015. "The Great American Symphony? The Inclusiveness of Charles Ives". Seattle Weekly (27 January) (accessed 27 May 2015).
- Boulez, Pierre. 1986. "The System Exposed". In Orientations: Collected Writings by Pierre Boulez, edited by Jean-Jacques Nattiez, translated by Martin Cooper, 129–142. Cambridge: Harvard University Press. ISBN 978-0-674-64375-8.
- Brotbeck, Roman. 2004. "Anmerkungen zur Pietà". In Internationales Stockhausen-Symposion 2000: LICHT. Musikwissenschaftliches Institut der Universität zu Köln, 19. bis 22. Oktober 2000. Tagungsbericht, edited by Imke Misch and Christoph von Blumröder, 51–60. Münster: Lit-Verlag. ISBN 978-3-8258-7944-0.
- Brown, Royal S. 1994. Overtones and Undertones: Reading Film Music. Berkeley and London: University of California Press. ISBN 978-0-520-08320-2.
- Clements, Andrew. 23 October 2008. Cybele. "Barlow: Works for Piano and Player Piano (Cybele)" (record review). The Guardian.
- Clendinning, Jane Piper. 1993. "The Pattern-Meccanico Compositions of György Ligeti". Perspectives of New Music 31, no. 1 (Winter): 192–234. doi:10.2307/833050.
- Couper, Mildred. January 1937. Dirge, for 2 Pianos, Second Piano Tuned One Quarter Tone Higher Than the First. New Music 10(2):4–12.
- Couture, François. "Clarence Barlow: ...until...". AllMusic (accessed 28 May 2015).
- Duchesneau, Louise. 2011. "'Play It Like Bill Evans': György Ligeti and Recorded Music". In György Ligeti: Of Foreign Lands and Strange Sounds, edited by Louise Duchesneau and Wolfgang Marx, 125–148. Woodbridge: Boydell Press. ISBN 978-1-84383-550-9.
- Fether, Deborah Carolyn. 2005. "A Discussion of Contemporary Flute Design and the Issues Surrounding these Developments". MMus diss. Goldsmiths College: University of London.
- Fiilin, Teemu. 2020. "Sampo Haapamäki wins Nordic Council Music Prize". Music Finland (Accessed 22 December 2020).
- Froom, David. 1994. American Composers: The Emerging Generation. ISBN 978-3-7186-5529-8.
- Gagné, Nicole V. 2012. Historical Dictionary of Modern and Contemporary Classical Music. Historical Dictionaries of Literature and the Arts. Lanham, Maryland: Scarecrow Press. ISBN 978-0-8108-6765-9 (cloth); ISBN 978-0-8108-7962-1 (ebook).
- Griffiths, Paul. 2001. "Ligeti, György (Sándor)". The New Grove Dictionary of Music and Musicians, second edition, edited by Stanley Sadie and John Tyrrell. London: Macmillan.
- Hansen, Richard K. 2005. The American Wind Band: A Cultural History. [S.l.]: GIA Publications ISBN 978-1-57999-467-9.
- He, Sineng [Edward Ho], Ming-chi Chan, Kenneth Kwan, Chi Cheung Leung, Jane Cheung, Stefan Siu Ming Au, Eton Kung, Patrick Chan, Richard Tsang, John Chen, Daniel P. Law, Joanna C. Lee, Victor Chan, Jenny Yip, Ting-cheong So, Kenneth Kwan, Hing-yan Chan, Kim-ho Ip, Richard Tsang, Joanna C. Lee, Ken Smith, Kenneth Kwan, Clarence Mak, Eton Kung, Poly Ng, Joshua Chan, and Kwong Chi. 2006. Understanding Contemporary Music: A Teaching Manual for Secondary and Primary School Teachers, 15 vols., 2 CDs, and 1 DVD. Hong Kong: Chinese University Press. ISBN 978-962-996-214-2. Chinese edition, as 現代音樂探索－中小學適用教材匯編 [Xian dai yin yue tan suo: zhong xiao xue shi yong jiao cai hui bian = Exploring Contemporary Music—Compilation of Primary and Secondary Application Materials]. Hong Kong: 中文大學出版社 [Chinese University Press], 2006. ISBN 978-962-996-215-9.
- Hettrick, William E. December 1971. "Tui St. George Tucker: Sonata and Romanza, for Solo Recorder. (Recorder Consort Editions, 14.) Brooklyn: Anfor Music Publishing Co., 1970". Notes second series 28(2):312.
- Hinson, Maurice. 1983. Music for More Than One Piano: An Annotated Guide. Bloomington: Indiana University Press. ISBN 978-0-253-33952-2 (cloth); ISBN 978-0-253-21457-7 (pbk).
- Lhermet, Vincent. 2016. "Le répertoire contemporain de l'accordéon en Europe depuis 1990: l'affirmation d'une nouvelle identité sonore", Université Paris-Sorbonne - École doctorale V., p. 31. (Accessed 22 December 2020)
- Johnston, Abby. 29 August 2013. "Blurred Lines: Robin Thicke & John Beckwith Aren't the Only Acts Sharing Song Titles", The Austin Chronicle.
- Keislar, Douglas. 1991. "Six American Composers on Nonstandard Tunings". Perspectives of New Music 29, no. 1 (Winter):176–211.
- Kurtz, Michael. 2007. Sofia Gubaidulina, first English edition, revised and expanded, translated by Christoph K. Lohmann, edited by Malcolm Hamrick Brown, foreword by Mstislav Rostropovich. Russian Music Studies. Bloomington: Indiana University Press. ISBN 978-0-253-34907-1.
- Lanser, Bryan, and Kevin Monahan. [1999]. "Danny Elfman's Big Adventure Continues in Sleepy Hollow". Archived from emu.com. Also at bluntinstrument.org.uk (Accessed 25 June 2012).
- Latham, Cara. 2008. "Mr. Tambourine Man: Seven Songs to Texts by Bob Dylan: A Song Cycle by John Corigliano". DMA diss. Philadelphia: Temple University.
- Macdonald, Hugh. 2001. "Halévy, (Jacques-François-)Fromental(-Elie) [Fromentin(-Elias)]", The New Grove Dictionary of Music and Musicians, second edition, edited by Stanley Sadie and John Tyrrell. London: Macmillan.
- Maxwell, Grant Lyle. 1993. Music for Three or More Pianists: A Historical Survey and Catalogue. Lanham, Maryland: Scarecrow Press. p. 103.
- Michaels, Sean. 27 August 2013. "Blurred Lines Is a Hit ... for an 86-Year-Old Classical Composer". The Guardian.
- Op de Coul, Manuel. 2012. "Discografie". Stichting Huygens-Fokker: Centrum voor Microtonaale Muziek. Huygens-Fokker.org. (Accessed 24 June 2012).
- Oteri, Frank J. 2004. "An Orchestral Improvisation CD Primer". American Composers Orchestra (accessed 23 September 2014).
- Oteri, Frank J. "Circles Mostly in Wood", NewMusicUSA.org.
- Pappastavrou, George. 1974. "Ives's Quarter-Tone Pieces". Clavier 13(7):31–32.
- Patterson, Michael David. 2009. "The Influence of Romanian Folk Music on the Music of George Enescu, with Special Reference to Romanian Rhapsody, Op. 11 no. 1, Sonata for Violin and Piano, Op. 25, No. 3, and Impression (sic) d'Enfance for Violin and Piano, Op. 28". M. Ph. thesis. Brisbane: University of Queensland.
- Read, Gardner. 1964. Music Notation: A Manual of Modern Practice. Boston: Alleyn and Bacon.
- Read, Gardner. 1990. 20th-Century Microtonal Notation. New York: Greenwood Press.
- Richards, Edwin Michael. 1992. The Clarinet of the Twenty-First Century. [Fairport, New York]: E + K Publishers.
- Riley, Charles A. 1996. Color Codes: Modern Theories of Color in Philosophy, Painting and Architecture, Literature, Music and Psychology. UPNE. ISBN 978-0-87451-742-2.
- Roig-Francolí, Miguel A. 1995. "Harmonic and Formal Processes in Ligeti's Net-Structure Compositions". Music Theory Spectrum 17, no. 2 (Autumn): 242–267. doi:10.2307/745873.
- Rosner, Arnold, and Vance Wolverton. 2001. "Hovhaness [Hovaness], Alan [Chakmakjian, Alan Hovhaness]". The New Grove Dictionary of Music and Musicians, second edition, edited by Stanley Sadie and John Tyrrell. London: Macmillan.
- Saffle, Michael. 2000. Perspectives on American Music, 1900–1950. ISBN 978-0-8153-2145-3.
- Saito, Mitsuru. 2008. A Critique of Etudes and Method Books for Advanced Euphoniumists: Status Quo and Future Recommendations. NOOK Study eTextbook. [N.p.]: ProQuest. ISBN 978-0-549-78383-1 (eBook).
- Sherwood, Gayle. 2002. Charles Ives. London and New York: Routledge.
- Skinner, Myles Leigh. 2007. "Toward a Quarter-Tone Syntax: Analyses of Selected Works by Blackwood, Haba, Ives, and Wyschnegradsky". Ph.D. diss. Buffalo: State University of New York.
- Somfai, László. 1996. Béla Bartók. Berkeley and Los Angeles: University of California Press. ISBN 978-0-520-08485-8.
- Steinitz, Richard. 2003. György Ligeti: Music of the Imagination. London: Faber and Faber. ISBN 978-0-571-17631-1; Boston: Northeastern University Press. ISBN 978-1-55553-551-3.
- Stockhausen, Karlheinz. 1964. Texte zur Musik 2, edited and with an afterword by Dieter Schnebel. DuMont Dokumente, Werk Nr. 305. Cologne: Verlag M. DuMont Schauberg.
- Toop, Richard. 1999. György Ligeti. London: Phaidon Press. ISBN 978-0-7148-3795-6.
- Tucker, Tui St. George. 1970. Sonata for Solo Recorder ("The Bullfinch") and Romanza for Solo Recorder. Recorder Consort Editions 14. Brooklyn: Anfor Music Publishing.
- Tucker, Tui St. George. 1986. Sarabande: Dance for Miriam Cooper, for microtonal harpsichord (score). Tui St. George Tucker website (Accessed 18 November 2011).
- Ysaÿe, Eugène. 1924. Six Sonatas pour violin seul, Op. 27. New York: G. Schirmer, Inc.
