= Charles Miller =

Charles Miller or Charlie Miller may refer to:

== Arts and entertainment ==
- Bronco Charlie Miller (1850-1955), American showman and Old West figure
- Charles F. Miller (1878–1925), American actor
- Charles Henry Miller (1842–1922), artist and painter
- Charlie Miller (magician) (1909-1989), magician
- Charles Miller (actor), actor in Thundering Trails (1943) and The Black Hills Express (1943)
- Charles Miller (author) (1918–1986), author of popular books on East African history
- Charles Miller (director) (1857–1936), American film director
- Charles Miller (musician) (1939–1980), in the band War

== Politics ==
- Charles E. Miller (1902–1979), American politician and businessman in Maryland
- Charles H. Miller (1918–1971), American politician and farmer in Minnesota
- Charles Miller (Kentucky politician) (1939–2025), state legislator in Kentucky
- Charles A. Miller (Alabama politician), Secretary of State of Alabama, 1868–70
- Charles A. Miller (Pennsylvania politician) (1850–1917), American businessman, newsworker, and politician from Harrisburg, Pennsylvania
- Charles R. Miller (politician) (1857–1927), governor of Delaware
- Charlie Miller (North Carolina politician), member of the North Carolina House of Representatives
- Charles W. Miller (1863–19??), American lawyer and politician in Indiana

== Sports ==
- "Steeplejack" Charles Miller (1882–1910), American climber
- Charles Darley Miller (1868–1951), polo player at the 1908 Summer Olympics
- Charles William Miller (1874–1953), father of Brazilian football
- Charlie Miller (pinch hitter) (1877–1951), Major League Baseball player
- Charlie Miller (shortstop) (1892–1972), Major League Baseball player
- Charlie Miller (born 1976), Scottish footballer
- Ookie Miller (Charles Lewis Miller, 1909–2002), National Football League player
- Charles Miller (Canadian football) (born 1953), Canadian football player
- Charles Lichty Miller (1887–?), American college football player and coach

== Other ==
- Charles A. Miller (political scientist) (1937–2019), professor emeritus of politics and American studies Lake Forest College
- Charles Miller (businessman) (1843–1927), founder of Galena-Signal Oil Company, commander of the Pennsylvania National Guard Division
- Charles Miller (educator), inducted into the Omaha Black Music Hall of Fame in 2005
- Charles Miller (entrepreneur), serial entrepreneur and former NASA senior manager, known for Nanoracks and Lynk Global
- Charles Miller (gambler) (1851–1881), gambler and confidence man
- Charles Miller (medium) (1870–1943), American spiritualist medium
- Charlie Miller (security researcher), known for identifying Apple product security flaws
- Charles Vance Millar (1853–1926), Canadian lawyer and financier
- Charles R. Miller (general) (born 1967), United States Army general
- Charles Ransom Miller (1849–1922), editor-in-chief of The New York Times
- Charlie Miller (hairdresser), Scottish celebrity hairdresser
- Charles Miller (colonel) (1862–1928), United States Army officer

== See also ==
- Chuck Miller (disambiguation)
