= Quarter tone clarinet =

Musical instrument

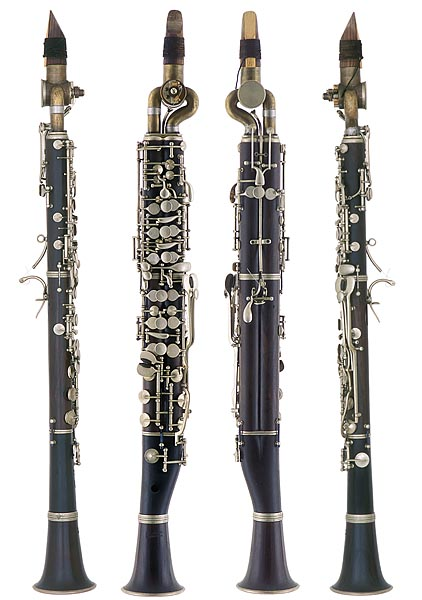
Quarter tone clarinet by Fritz Schüller (1883–1977) of Markneukirchen

A quarter tone clarinet is an experimental clarinet designed to play music using quarter tone intervals.

Around 1900, Dr. Richard H. Stein, a Berlin musicologist made the first quarter-tone clarinet, which was soon abandoned.

Using special fingerings, quarter tones may be produced by a skilled player on a conventional clarinet. However, such fingerings are awkward in rapid passages, and results tend to vary from one clarinet to another. In the 1920s Alois Hába commissioned a quarter tone clarinet from the Kohlert company of Grazlitz. In 1937, another German, the instrument builder Fritz Schüller (1883–1977) of Markneukirchen made an attempt to create a quarter tone clarinet to overcome these problems. It consisted of a single mouthpiece connected to two parallel bores, one slightly longer than the other; effectively these were two clarinets tuned a quarter tone apart. A single set of keywork controlled the tone holes of both bores simultaneously, and a valve was provided to switch rapidly from one bore to the other.

Music for quarter tone clarinet has been written by Eric Mandat, Alois Hába (Sonata and Matka), Viktor Ullmann, and by some various jazz musicians through the late 20th century. Other composers, such as Béla Bartók and Pierre Boulez, wrote for conventional clarinet using quarter tones.

== See also ==
- List of quarter tone pieces
