= Morris Miller =

Morris Miller may refer to

- Morris S. Miller (1779–1824), United States representative from New York
- E. Morris Miller (1881–1964), Australian author
- Morris Miller (judge) (1908–1970), American judge in the District of Columbia
- Robert Merrill (1917–2004), American operatic baritone and actor, also known as Morris Miller

== See also ==
- Maurice Miller, British politician
