= Chuck Miller =

Chuck Miller may refer to:

- Chuck Miller (musician) (1924–2000), American singer and pianist
- Charles A. Miller (political scientist) (1937–2019), American author and academic
- Chuck Miller (baseball) (1889–1961), Major League Baseball outfielder

== See also ==
- Charles Miller (disambiguation)
