= Richard Stein =

Richard Stein may refer to:

- Richard S. Stein, American scientist
- Richard Stein, Romanian composer, author of the song "Sanie cu zurgălăi"
- Richard Frey, born Richard Stein, Austrian-born Chinese doctor and politician
- Richard Heinrich Stein, German composer
