= Tom Miller (travel writer) =

American author (born 1947)

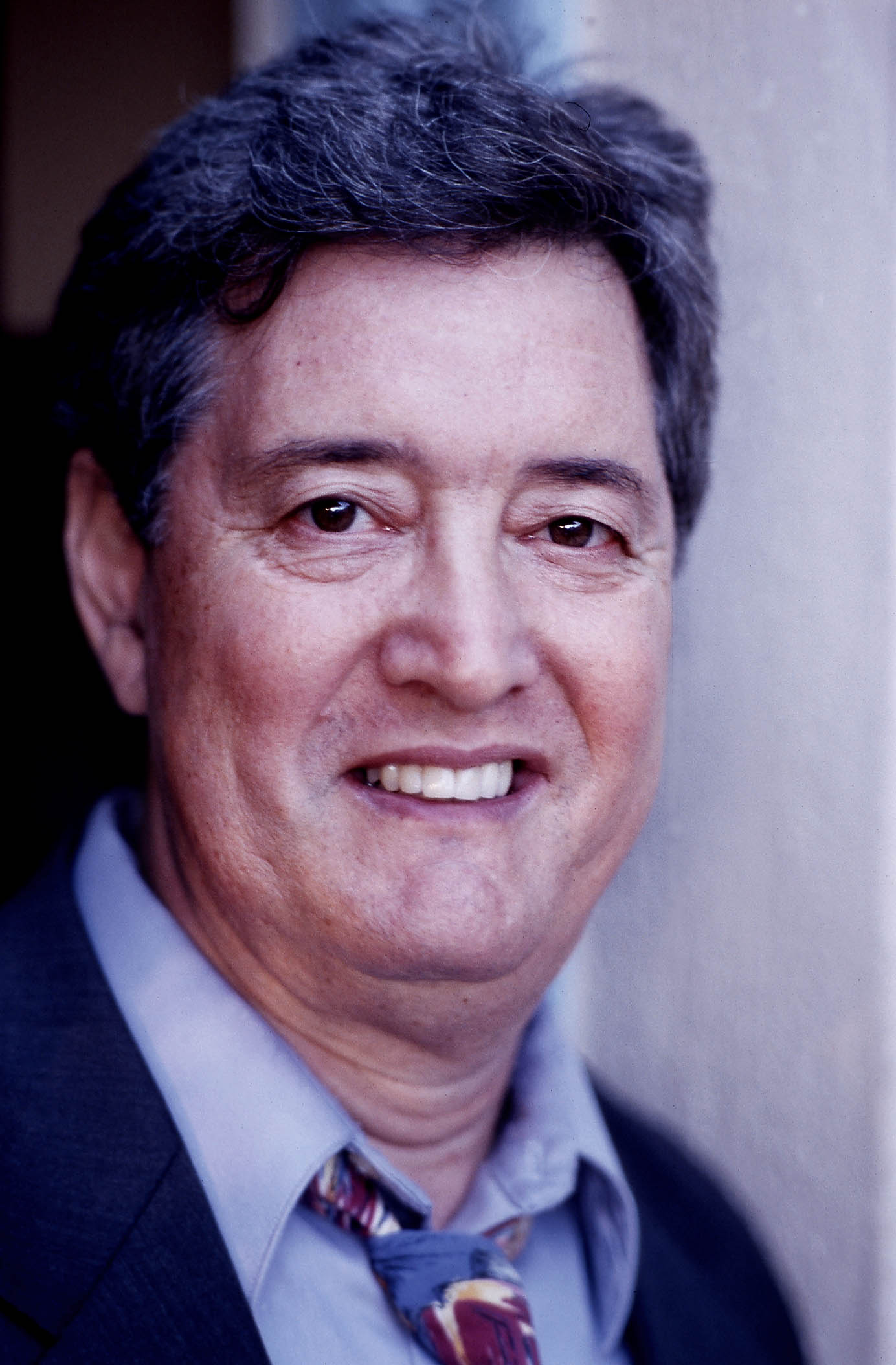
Tom Miller (photographer: Jay Rochlin)

Tom Miller (August 11, 1947, in Washington, D.C. – December 19, 2022, in Tucson, Arizona) was an American author primarily known for travel literature. His eleven books include The Panama Hat Trail, On the Border, Trading with the Enemy, Jack Ruby's Kitchen Sink (later rereleased as Revenge of the Saguaro), and Where Was I? A Travel Writer's Memoir. He has written articles for the New York Times, Washington Post, The New Yorker, The Smithsonian, Natural History, Rolling Stone, Life, Crawdaddy and many other magazines.

== Early life ==
Miller's childhood was full of reading. The family read three newspapers daily, and the bookshelves of his home were always full. His parents were Morris Miller and Sara Levy Miller, a child psychologist and artist. His siblings were Professor Charles A. Miller, Ann Elizabeth Miller Monahan, and John Donald Miller. His earliest travels were to Camp Catawba, a summer boys' camp in the Blue Ridge Mountains of North Carolina. He wrote for his high school newspaper, and by his fifth and final semester of college, was editor-in-chief of the school's weekly paper. But this was the late 1960s, and the underground, anti-war press had for him a cultural and political appeal the college presses lacked. He continued through the early 1970s editing and writing underground pamphlets, papers, and flyers.

== Career ==
In 1969 he moved to Tucson, Arizona. He tried working odd jobs—selling encyclopedias door-to-door and working as a janitor, both jobs lasting four weeks—but focused on living cheaply and writing for whatever money he could earn. In the late sixties and early 1970s Miller continued to write for underground and alternative periodicals such as The Rag in Austin, the Washington Free Press, Dallas Notes, Dallas Iconoclast, the Albuquerque Current, Liberation News Service, the Liberated Guardian, and many other outlets. He soon wrote for "sea level" publications, as his colleague Andrew Kopkind called them – Fusion, Creem, Rolling Stone, and the like. His first break would come after writing a short piece for SunDance magazine that an editor at Esquire happened to read. He had been paid $15 to write the article; the editor suggested his magazine would have paid $750 for the same work. Soon he would find his first mainstream work with them.

In 1971 the Internal Security Division of the U.S. Justice Department probing the anti-Vietnam war protests, subpoenaed Miller to testify before a grand jury. He refused to enter the grand jury room, claiming First Amendment rights that as a journalist, even free-lance for the underground press, to testify in secret would place a cloak of suspicion over him and affect his ability to gather news. Many journalists wrote affidavits on his behalf. US District Court Judge William Frey ruled on Miller's behalf, stating that Miller "appears to be a member of the group about which he reports rather than an objective reporter. He occupies a dual capacity. However..." The Justice Department appealed the decision and refused to state its reason for subpoenaing Miller. Eventually the grand jury expired and the case ended with Miller free and clear of its purpose.

An offbeat 1975 article Miller wrote for Crawdaddy about the Kennedy Assassination was read by a literary agent who insisted it could be expanded into a full-length book. This became The Assassination Please Almanac, his first book, whose cover blurb called it "a consumer's guide to conspiracy theories."

Life on the southern U.S. border inspired his first travel book: On the Border: Portraits of America's Southwestern Frontier. He travelled the full 2,000 mile length of the United States–Mexico border interviewing its denizens. The book was published in 1981. For approximately six years (1979-1985) Miller worked as a stringer for the National Desk of the New York Times, filing stories on conflict and culture in the Southwest borderlands.

His 1986 travelogue, The Panama Hat Trail follows the making and marketing of a (misnomered) Panama hat from the straw fields of Ecuador and its weaving by Indian peasants, to its finishing in a North American hat factory, and finally to a customer in a San Diego retail hat shop.

His book Jack Ruby's Kitchen Sink: Offbeat Portraits of America's Southwest, won the 2000 Lowell Thomas Award for "Best Travel Book of the Year," given by the Society of American Travel Writers Foundation (The book was later retitled Revenge of the Saguaro).

In 1987 he first visited Cuba and moved to that Caribbean Island for eight months in the summer of 1990. In 1992 his experiences there became the book, Trading With the Enemy: A Yankee Travels Through Castro's Cuba. He wrote many articles about Cuba for a wide range of publications. As co-founder and co-director of Writers of the Americas (2000-2002) Miller arranged for approximately 15 American writers to mix with a like number of Cuban writers in Havana in somewhat of a literary détente. In 2008 he began leading annual one-week Literary Havana tours, introducing Americans to Cuba's literary personalities and activities.

Miller conceived and edited the book How I Learned English: 55 Accomplished Latinos Recall Lessons in Language and Life, published simultaneously in Spanish in 2007.

He has also edited anthologies about Cuba and the Mexican border and was a major contributor to the 4-volume Encyclopedia Latina. His collection of over 80 versions of La Bamba led to his Rhino Records compilation The Best of La Bamba.

The University of Arizona Library acquired Miller's archives and in 2004 mounted a major exhibit of his papers. He has served as adjunct research associate at the University of Arizona's Latin American Area Center since 1990, and resided in Tucson with his wife, Regla Albarrán. In 2008 the City of Quito, at a public ceremony in its Centro Historico, proclaimed Miller "Un Huésped Ilustre" (An Illustrious Guest) for his literary contributions to Ecuador. Miller is a member of the Thornton Wilder Society and the Cervantes Society of America, as well as The Authors Guild. One of Miller's siblings is Charles A. Miller (1937-2019), Professor Emeritus of Politics and American Studies, Lake Forest College.

In 2015 he was a guest travel writing workshop leader at the Port Townsend (Washington) Writers Conference.

In 2016, the Cultural Ministry of Mexico selected Revenge of the Saguaro: Portraits of America's Southwestern Frontier to be translated into Spanish by the Trilce Publishing Company.

In addition to leading land-based study tours of Cuba, in 2017 Miller was the on-board lecturer on the Sea Mist, a 200-passenger cruise ship that circumnavigated the island, stopping at various port cities during the ten day journey.

In the fall of 2017 a Festschrift (literary tribute) was published in Miller's honor, with essays about his work and writing style.

Miller was the focus of a panel entitled "Tom Miller, Hot and Cold" at the 2018 Tucson Festival of Books.

== Quotes on writing ==
"Great travel writing consists of equal parts curiosity, vulnerability and vocabulary. It is not a terrain for know-it-alls or the indecisive. The best of the genre can simply be an elegant natural history essay, a nicely writ sports piece, or a well-turned profile of a bar band and its music. A well-grounded sense of place is the challenge for the writer. We observe, we calculate, we inquire, we look for a link between what we already know and what we're about to learn. The finest travel writing describes what's going on when nobody's looking."

"No camera, no recording device, no laptop, none of this palm pilot nonsense or a cell phone. Paper and pencil, a book, maybe a bilingual dictionary. Anything beyond that (a) can be stolen, and (b) intimidates people you encounter. The more double-A batteries you carry, the more you distance yourself from the people you're writing about."

== Bibliography ==
- Cuba: Hot and Cold, (2017) University of Arizona Press
- Trading With the Enemy: A Yankee Travels Through Castro's Cuba, (2008) (re-released with new introduction) Basic Books Publishing
- How I Learned English: 55 Latinos Recall Lessons in Language and Life, (ed) (2007)
- Writing on the Edge: A Borderlands Reader, (ed) (2003)
- Travelers' Tales—Cuba, (ed) (2001)
- Jack Ruby's Kitchen Sink: Offbeat Travels Through America's Southwest, (2000) (re-released as Revenge of the Saguaro in 2010 )
- Trading With the Enemy: A Yankee Travels Through Castro's Cuba, (1992)
- The Panama Hat Trail: A Journey From South America, (1986)
- Arizona: The Land and the People, (ed) (1986)
- The Interstate Gourmet: Texas and the Southwest, (co-author) (1986)
- On the Border: Portraits of America's Southwestern Frontier, (1981)
- The Assassination Please Almanac, (1977)
