= Twelve Microtonal Etudes for Electronic Music Media =

Easley Blackwood's Twelve Microtonal Etudes for Electronic Music Media, "21 Notes", mm. 1–6

Blackwood's notation system for 24 equal temperament

Blackwood's notation system for 21 equal temperament: intervals are notated similarly to those they approximate and there are different enharmonic equivalents.

Twelve Microtonal Etudes for Electronic Music Media, Op. 28, is a set of pieces in various microtonal equal temperaments composed and released on LP in 1980 by American composer Easley Blackwood Jr.

In the late 1970s, Blackwood won a grant from the National Endowment for the Humanities to investigate the harmonic and modal properties of microtonal tunings. The project culminated in the Microtonal Etudes, composed as illustrations of the tonal possibilities of all the equal tunings from 13 to 24 notes to the octave. He was intrigued by "finding conventional harmonic progressions" in unconventional tunings. "What I was particularly interested in was chord progressions that would give a sensation either of modal coherence or else of tonality. That is to say you can actually identify subdominants, dominants, tonics, and keys."

Blackwood likened the task to writing a "sequel" to The Well-Tempered Clavier.

The Twelve Microtonal Etudes were re-released on compact disc in 1994, accompanied by two additional compositions of Blackwood's in tunings he explored in the Etudes: Fanfare in 19-note Equal Tuning, Op. 28a, and Suite for Guitar in 15-note Equal Tuning, Op. 33. The fanfare, like the etudes, was performed by the composer on Polyfusion synthesizer. The suite was performed by guitarist Jeffrey Kust on an acoustic guitar with a modified fretboard.

== Orchestral Arrangement by Matthew Sheeran ==
In January 2024, an acoustic performance of the Twelve Microtonal Etudes on real orchestral instruments, titled "Acoustic Microtonal," was released by Matthew Sheeran (brother to singer-songwriter Ed Sheeran). The album, featuring the Budapest Scoring Orchestra, was produced by Sheeran, who arranged Blackwood's original compositions for traditional orchestral instruments. The recording was produced by first having the orchestral musicians perform "approximated" 12-tone versions of the original etudes on their instruments. These preliminary recordings were then transformed into their intended tunings using the Melodyne electronic retuning software.
