= Richard Heinrich Stein =

German composer (1882–1942)

- Born: 28 February 1882; Halle an der Saale, German Empire
- Died: 11 August 1942 (aged 60); Santa Brígida, Canary Islands, Spain
- Education: University of Erlangen; Royal Academy of Musical Performing Arts
- Occupations: Composer; Musicographer

Richard Heinrich Stein (28 February 1882 – 11 August 1942) was a German composer and musicographer. He is best known for the symbols he developed to notate quarter-tones, which Stein first used in his Op. 26 pieces, the Zwei Konzertstücke für Violoncello und Klavier. Three of the symbols Stein uses in these pieces have become part of the standard system of quarter-tone notation known as the Stein-Zimmermann accidentals. The Zwei Konzertstücke are among the earliest pieces of music published in Europe to incorporate quarter-tones.

== Early life and education ==
Richard Heinrich Stein was born on February 2, 1882 in Halle an der Saale to mining officer Dr. Richard Stein and his wife Henriette Stein, née Kreutz. From 1891 through 1898, Stein attended the Hallenser Städtische Gymnasium in Halle. He later attended schools in Wernigerode and Merseburg before graduating from the Königliche Domgymnasium in Magdeburg.

== Career ==
In 1904, Stein joined the 2nd Garde-Dragoner-Regiment as a one-year volunteer, though was assigned to the Landsturm after only six months of service.

Stein briefly studied law at the University of Berlin, though left to pursue music at the Royal Academy of Musical Performing Arts in Berlin, where he studied under Engelbert Humperdinck. Stein received his doctorate from the University of Erlangen in 1911 after completing his dissertation on psychologist Wilhelm Wundt.

Stein left Germany during World War I and lived in the Canary Islands between 1914 and 1919. After returning to Berlin, Stein directed his own music school in Nikolassee from 1920 to 1922, served as the musical director at the Urania Theater, and directed the Berliner Rundfunk for a short time.

Stein was an advocate for quarter-tone music, and wrote his first quarter-tone pieces, the Zwei Konzertstücke für Violoncello und Klavier, op. 26 in 1905. Stein also had both a clarinet and a piano specially constructed to be able to play quarter-tones. Stein retracted the publication of his op. 26 pieces as well as his quarter-tone clarinet in 1914 as he did not want to be jointly responsible for the development of quarter-tone music. Stein's use of quarter-tones in his music was incredibly conservative compared to his contemporaries such as Alois Hába and Ivan Wyschnegradsky, so Stein likely felt his use of quarter-tones in the Zwei Konzertstücke would equate to an endorsement of their more widespread use. Stein later embraced the use of quarter-tones once again, hosting the First International Quarter-tone Conference at his home in 1922, the attendees of which included both Hába and Wyschnegradsky. After the Conference, Stein wrote an article titled "Vierteltonmusik" (Quarter-tone Music), published in Die Musik in 1923, where he advocates for their use.

Stein worked as a composer, pianist, and piano pedagogue in Steglitz until at least 1929 before fleeing Germany again in either 1932 or 1933 as a result of the growing power of the Nazis. Stein returned to the Canary Islands, building his own house which he called his ‘Casa del Sol’ in Santa Brígida. On the islands, Stein participated in conferences, published several articles, and organized musical evenings both at his home and at the Teatro Pérez Galdós in Las Palmas.

== Death ==
Stein died mysteriously in his home on August 11, 1942.

== Works ==
- Aus meinem Leben: 12 kleine Tongedichte für Pianoforte, op. 3 (by 1903)
- Zwei kleine Lieder, op. 4 (by 1907)
- Drei Gedichte von Theodor Storm, op. 5 (by 1904)
- Drei Lieder, op. 6 (by 1904)
- Abseits, op. 7 (by 1907)
- Zwei schlichte Weisen, op. 9 (by 1907)
- Der Wiesenpfad, op. 10 (by 1907)
- Vier Gesänge, op. 14 (by 1907)
- Zwei Konzertstücke für Violoncello und Klavier, op. 26 (1906)
- Zwei Fantasiestücke für Viola und Klavier, op. 27
- Sechs leichte Klavierstücke für Pianoforte zu zwei Händen, op. 30
- Kanarische Suite, op. 34 (1932)

== Bibliography ==
=== Books ===
- Die Moderne Musik/La Música Moderna (1918)
- Grieg: Eine Biographie (1921)
- Tchaikovsky (1927)

=== Journal articles ===
- "Musikerkammern," Die Musik 12, No. 17 (1913), pp. 314–315
- "Der Verband Deutscher Musikkritiker: Eine Entgegnung," Die Musik 12, Nos. 19 (1913), pp. 17–19 and 21 (1913), pp. 230–234
- "Der Fünfte Kongress der Internationalen Musikgesellschaft," Die Musik 13, No. 21 (1914), pp. 159–165
- "Liszts "Vallée d'Obermann," Die Musik 13, No. 23 (1914), pp. 262–269
- "Die Kirchentänze in Sevilla," Die Musik 15, No. 1 (1922), pp. 29–36
- "Die Musik in der Weltkrise," Die Musik 15, No. 3 (1922), pp. 194–200
- "Vierteltonmusik," Die Musik 15, No. 7 (1923), pp. 510–516
- "Das Vierteltonproblem II," Die Musik 15, No. 10 (1923), pp. 741–746
- "Wanda Landowska," Die Musik 17, No. 1 (1924), pp. 16–20
- "Probleme der Rundfunkmusik," Die Musik 18, No. 4 (1926), pp. 263–269
- "Tchaikowskijs Abschied vom Lieben," Die Musik 19, No. 3 (1926), pp. 153–161

=== Magazine articles ===
- "Das Heidelberger Musikfest," Deutsche Tonkünstler-Zeitung No. 233 [1911–1912?]
- "Danzig," Signale für die musikalische Welt Nos. 23–24 (1912)
- "Musikfeste," Deutsche Tonkünstler-Zeitung No. 264 (1913)
- "Roseberry d'Arguto," Halbmonatsschrift für Schulemusikpflege Nos. 8–10 (1924)
- "Zukunftsmusik im Rundfunk," Der deutsche Rundfunk 3, No. 12 (1925)

== Recordings ==
- "KONZERTSTUCKE Op. 26, #1 (1906) by Richard H. Stein" and "Stein 2 of 2." F.3 CLASSIC MICROTONALITY: Joel Mandelbaum, Mikael Glinka, Alois Haba, Ivan Wyschnegradsky, Richard Stein, Sophia Gubaidulina, Tui St. George Tucker, Ivor Darreg, & Johnny Reinhard: AMERICAN FESTIVAL OF MICROTONAL MUSIC. Released October 17, 2020, with Johnny Reinhard.
- Kanarische Suite: 20 short tone poems (and one episode) for piano two hands, Op. 34 (1932). Recorded November 24, 2023, with Sergio Alonso. NEOS 32404.
