= Vera Lachmann =

German poet and educationist (1904–1985)

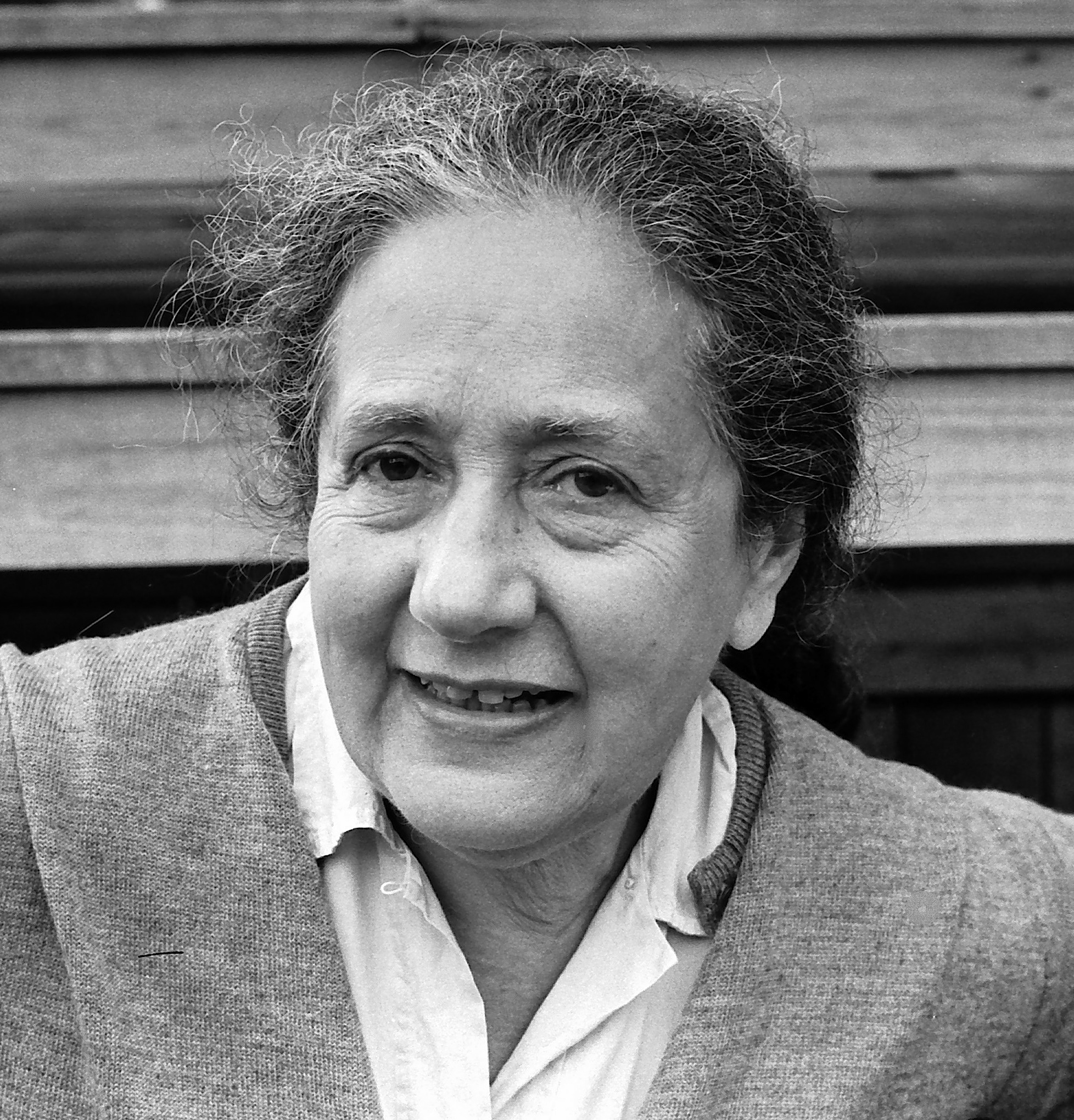
- Vera Lachmann at Camp Catawba, circa 1967
- Born: June 23, 1904
- Died: 1985 (aged 80–81)

Vera Lachmann (June 23, 1904 – 1985) was a German poet, classicist and educator. After founding a school for Jewish children in Nazi Germany, she emigrated to the United States in 1939 and established Camp Catawba, a summer camp for boys.

== Early life in Germany ==
Lachmann was born in 1904 in Berlin, into a family of German-Jewish heritage. After attending a private school for girls, she enrolled in the Humboldt University of Berlin and the University of Basel in 1923 to study philology, language and literature. She earned a PhD from the University in Berlin in 1931, and planned to go on to teach at the university level. However, due to the bias against women in the field of tertiary education, she trained instead to teach at the Gymnasium (secondary school) level.

In 1933, shortly after Adolf Hitler assumed power in Germany, Lachmann founded a private school for children of Jewish and Jewish-Christian parents who had been expelled from public schools. The school, which was held on the property of Lachmann's relatives, was closed by Nazi officials shortly after Kristallnacht in 1938.

== Emigration to the United States ==
Lachmann left Germany for the United States in November 1939, assisted by friends in both countries. She worked at Vassar College's German department until 1941, and subsequently taught at Salem College for two years, Bryn Mawr College for one year, and Yale University for two years. She also held brief positions at the City College of New York and Brooklyn College. Castrum Peregrini Press published three volumes of her poetry, which were heavily influenced by Ancient Greek literature, in both German and (translated) English.

In 1944, Lachmann founded Camp Catawba, a summer camp for boys in Blowing Rock, North Carolina. She directed the camp until its closure in 1970. The camp's focus was a balance of recreation and the arts, and each year Lachmann directed the young campers in a play, some of which were by William Shakespeare. She also chose ancient Greek works by Aristophanes, Aeschylus and Sophocles; she translated Sophocles' tragedy Philoctetes herself for a camp production.

Lachmann's life partner was Tui St. George Tucker, an American composer whom Lachmann met in 1946 when Tucker began working as a music instructor at Camp Catawba.

== Death ==
Lachmann died in January 1985 at Saint Vincent's Catholic Medical Center in Manhattan. She was 80 years old.
