= Neutral sixth =

- Inverse: neutral third

Name
- Other names: -
- Abbreviation: n6

Size
- Semitones: ~8½
- Interval class: ~3½
- Just interval: 18:11 or 13:8

Cents
- 12-Tone equal temperament: N/A
- 24-Tone equal temperament: 850
- Just intonation: 853 or 841

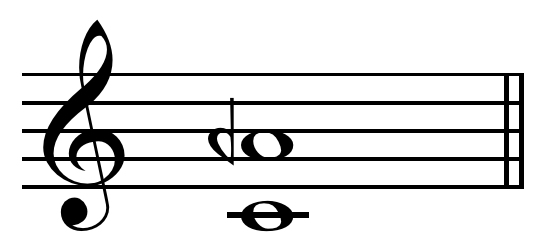
Neutral sixth on C.

A neutral sixth is a musical interval wider than a minor sixth but narrower than a major sixth. Three distinct intervals may be termed neutral sixths:

- The undecimal neutral sixth has a ratio of 18:11 between the frequencies of the two tones, or about 852.59 cents.
- A tridecimal neutral sixth has a ratio of 13:8 between the frequencies of the two tones, or about 840.53 cents. This is the smallest neutral sixth, and occurs infrequently in music, as little music utilizes the 13th harmonic.
- An equal-tempered neutral sixth is 850 cents, a hair narrower than the 18:11 ratio. It is an equal-tempered quarter tone exactly halfway between the equal-tempered minor and major sixths, and half of an equal-tempered perfect eleventh (octave plus fourth).

These intervals are all within about 12 cents of each other and are difficult for most people to distinguish. Neutral sixths are roughly a quarter tone sharp from 12 equal temperament (12-ET) minor sixths and a quarter tone flat from 12-ET major sixths. In just intonation, as well as in tunings such as 31-ET, 41-ET, or 72-ET, which more closely approximate just intonation, the intervals are closer together.

A neutral sixth can be formed by subtracting a neutral second from a minor seventh. Based on its positioning in the harmonic series, the undecimal neutral sixth implies a root one minor seventh above the higher of the two notes.

== Thirteenth harmonic ==
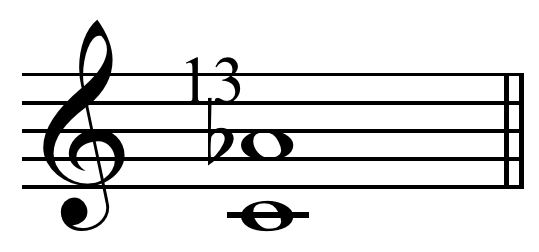
Thirteenth harmonic on C.

The pitch ratio 13:8 (840.53 cents) is the ratio of the thirteenth harmonic and is notated in Ben Johnston's system as A^{13}♭. In 24-ET is approximated by A. This note is often corrected to a just or Pythagorean ratio on the natural horn, but the pure thirteenth harmonic was used in pieces including Britten's Serenade for tenor, horn and strings.

== See also ==
- List of musical intervals
- List of pitch intervals
- Microtonal music
