= Morris Miller (judge) =

American jurist (1908–1970)

Judge Morris Miller
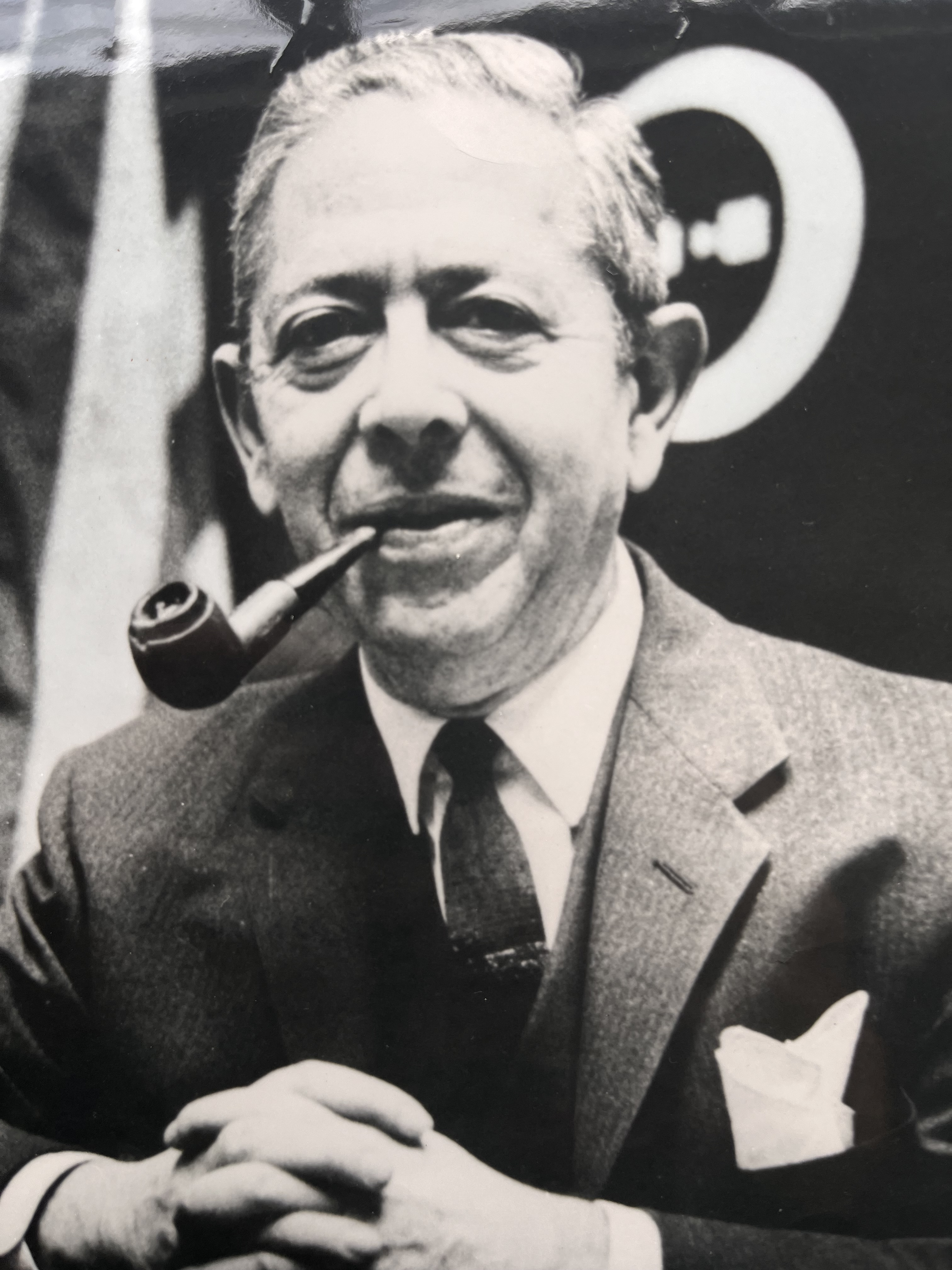
- Morris Miller at his desk in his chambers

1st Chief Judge of the Juvenile Court of the District of Columbia
- Appointed by: John F. Kennedy

Personal details
- Born: July 25, 1908
- Died: May 7, 1970 (aged 61)
- Citizenship: United States
- Spouse: Sara Levy Miller
- Children: Charles A. Miller, Ann Elizabeth Miller Monahan, John Donald Miller, Thomas Lawrence Miller
- Occupation: Lawyer, judge

Morris Miller (July 25, 1908 – May 7, 1970) was the first Chief Judge of the Juvenile Court of the District of Columbia. He was appointed by President John F. Kennedy.

== Early life and education ==
Miller was born on July 25, 1908, in Sheffield, Alabama to Jewish Lithuanian immigrants, and grew up in St. Louis, Missouri.

Miller attended Washington University in St. Louis, and graduated with a law degree in 1928. He later attended New York University, graduating in 1930 with a B.S. in education. Following this, he studied for an M.A. in government, which he obtained in 1932.

== Career ==
In 1933, Miller left St Louis for Washington, where he started work as Counsel for the Public Works Administration. He worked there until 1937, and regularly worked around national housing policy.

During World War II, Miller served as an attorney in the Coast Guard. Later, he worked in the law firm of US Senator Scott W. Lucas.

Miller was appointed to the District of Columbia Juvenile Court in 1962, along with Marjorie Lawson, Washington D.C's first black female judge. Miller's appointment as Chief Judge came as a consequence of the court's expansion from a single judge to three judges. His swearing-in ceremony was attended by many Washington notables who had been involved in that expansion effort. The US Senate hearings on Judge Miller's appointment noted the financial sacrifice he would make from the private practice of law to the court.

The Juvenile Court's backlog of cases and philosophical approaches to juvenile delinquency were early issues in Judge Miller's tenure and continued over his time on the court. Among the many improvements Judge Miller made to the Juvenile Court were the inclusion of legal aid for juvenile defendants, the incorporation of the Boy Scouts of America in efforts to combat juvenile delinquency, and the application of a set of tools to improve juvenile justice.

One of the more public and controversial judgements Judge Miller made was to order a life-saving blood transfusion for an infant whose Seventh Day Adventist parents had refused to allow it.

Upon Judge Miller's death, lawyer Joseph L. Rauh Jr. extolled his life of public service.

== Personal life ==
Judge Miller was married to Sara Levy Miller (1909–1990), a child psychologist and artist. His children were Charles Allen Miller (1937–2019), Ann Elizabeth Miller Monahan (1940–2024), John Donald Miller (1942), and Thomas Lawrence Miller (1947–2022).
