= Easley Blackwood Jr. =

American classical composer (1933–2023)

- Born: April 21, 1933
- Died: January 22, 2023 (aged 89)
- Occupations: professor; pianist; composer; author
- Instrument: piano
- Formerly of: Chicago Pro Musica

Easley Rutland Blackwood Jr. (April 21, 1933 – January 22, 2023) was an American professor of music, concert pianist, composer (sometimes using unusual tunings), and the author of books on music theory, including his research into the properties of microtonal tunings and traditional harmony.

== Biography ==
Blackwood was born in Indianapolis, Indiana, on April 21, 1933. He studied piano there and was doing solo appearances at the age of 14 with the Indianapolis Symphony Orchestra. After studies at many places (including Yale University, where he earned his Master of Arts degree) in the United States, he went to Paris to study from 1954 to 1956. His teachers include Olivier Messiaen, Paul Hindemith, and Nadia Boulanger. For forty years, from 1958 to 1997, Blackwood taught at the University of Chicago, most of the time with the title of Professor. He then became Professor Emeritus at the university.

He received the Quantrell Award.

Blackwood's initial compositions were not particularly unconventional although in them he employed polyrhythm and wide melodic contours. This early music by Blackwood has been characterized as in an atonal yet a formally conservative style. In 1980–81 Blackwood shifted rather abruptly to a new style, releasing Twelve Microtonal Etudes for Electronic Music Media. For these pieces, he used microtonality to create unusual equal tempered musical scales. Blackwood has explored all equal temperaments from 13 through 24, including 15-ET and 19-ET.

Although Blackwood recorded most of these pieces with a synthesizer, his "Suite in 15-Note Equal Tuning, Op. 33" was performed live on a specially constructed guitar. His compositional style moved toward a late-19th-century tonality; he has likened its harmonic syntax to Verdi, Ravel, and Franck. As a performer at the piano, Blackwood played diverse compositions and promoted the music of Charles Ives, Pierre Boulez, and the Second Viennese School. In addition to his solo piano performances, Blackwood was pianist in the chamber group Chicago Pro Musica, largely comprising members of the Chicago Symphony Orchestra.

Blackwood was known for his book The Structure of Recognizable Diatonic Tunings (Princeton: Princeton University Press; ISBN 0691091293), published in 1985. A number of recordings of his music have been released by Cedille Records (the label of the Chicago Classical Recording Foundation) beginning in the 1990s such as Introducing Easley Blackwood.

== Personal life ==
His father, Easley Blackwood Sr., was a noted contract bridge player and writer.

Blackwood died in Chicago on January 22, 2023, at the age of 89.

== Works with Opus Numbers ==
- Sonata No. 1 for Viola and Piano, Op. 1 (1953)
- Chamber Symphony for 14 Wind Instruments, Op. 2 (1955)
- Symphony No. 1, Op. 3 (1955)
- String Quartet No. 1, Op. 4 (1957)
- Concertino for 5 Instruments, Op. 5 (1959)
- String Quartet No. 2, Op. 6 (1959)
- Sonata No. 1 for Violin and Piano, Op. 7 (1960)
- Fantasy for Cello and Piano, Op. 8 (1960)
- Symphony No. 2, Op. 9 (1960)
- Chaconne for Carillon, Op. 10 (1961)
- Pastorale and Variations for Wind Quintet, Op. 11 (1961)
- Sonata for Flute and Harpsichord, Op. 12 (1962)
- Concerto for Clarinet and Orchestra, Op. 13 (1964)
- Symphony No. 3, Op. 14 (1964)
- Fantasy for Flute, Clarinet, Violin, and Piano, Op. 15 (1965)
- Three Short Fantasies for Piano, Op. 16 (1965)
- Symphonic Fantasy, Op. 17 (1965)
- Symphonic Movement for Organ, Op. 18 (1966)
- Concerto for Oboe and String Orchestra, Op. 19 (1966)
- Un voyage à Cythère for Soprano and 10 Instruments, Op. 20 (1966)
- Concerto for Violin and Orchestra, Op. 21 (1967)
- Piano Trio, Op. 22 (1968)
- Concerto for Flute and String Orchestra, Op. 23 (1968)
- Concerto for Piano and Orchestra, Op. 24 (1970)
- Four Letter Scenes from Gulliver for Voices and Electronics, Op. 25 (1972)
- Sonata No. 2 for Violin and Piano, Op. 26 (1975)
- Symphony No. 4, Op. 27 (1977)
- Twelve Microtonal Etudes for Electronic Music Media, Op. 28 (1980)
- Fanfare for WFMT (electronic), Op. 28a (1981)
- Sonata for Guitar, Op. 29 (1983)
- Five Concert Etudes for Piano, Op. 30 (1984)
- Sonata for Cello and Piano, Op. 31 (1985)
- Festival Overture for Steel Band, Op. 31a (1986)
- Sonata for Solo Violin, Op. 32 (1986)
- Suite for Guitar in 15-Note Equal Tuning, Op. 33 (1987)
- Symphony No. 5, Op. 34 (1990)
- Rondo Caprice for Flute and Guitar, Op. 35 (1992)
- Seven Bagatelles for Piano, Op. 36 (1993)
- Sonata for Clarinet and Piano, Op. 37 (1994)
- Sonatina for Piccolo Clarinet and Piano, Op. 38 (1994)
- Sonatina for Carillon, Op. 39 (1996)
- Sonata for Piano, Op. 40 (1996)
- Two Nocturnes for Piano, Op. 41 (1996)
- String Quartet No. 3, Op. 42 (1998)
- Sonata No. 2 for Viola and Piano, Op. 43 (2001)
- A King James Magnificat (for choir), Op. 44 (2004)
- Sonata for Trumpet and Piano, Op. 45 (2008)
- Concerto for 10 Brass, Op. 46 (2011?)
- Partita for Harpsichord, Op. 47 (2012, almost complete)

== See also ==
- See: List of music students by teacher: A to B#Easley Blackwood.
