= Mildred Couper =

American classical composer (1887–1974)

- Mildred Couper, from a 1933 publication.
- Born: Mildred Cooper; December 10, 1887; Buenos Aires, Argentina
- Died: August 9, 1974 (aged 86); Santa Barbara, California
- Occupations: Musician, composer

Mildred Couper (December 10, 1887 in Buenos Aires, Argentina – August 9, 1974 in Santa Barbara, United States) was a prominent composer and pianist, and one of the first American musicians to experiment with quarter-tone music. She was based in Santa Barbara, California.

== Early life ==
Mildred Cooper was born in Buenos Aires, the daughter of Reginald Cooper and Harriet Hathaway Jacobs (1849-1931). Her father was born in England; her mother was born in Argentina to Wilson Jacobs III and Harriet Hathaway Moores, both American-born. She began her serious musical studies at the Williams Conservatory in Argentina, and pursued further training in Italy, Germany and France, where she studied piano with Moritz Moszkowski and composition with Nadia Boulanger.

== Career ==
Couper taught piano for nine years at the David Mannes Music School in New York. She moved with her children to California in 1927 and established a studio in Santa Barbara, where she started her experiments with two pianos by tuning the first a quarter tone higher than the second. This increased the normal 88 pitch levels to 176, expanding so the gamut by a quarter step to emphasize the character of the harmony. Her first work in this medium was the ballet Xanadu (1930), which was performed in the production of Eugene O'Neill's Marco Millions in the Lobero Theatre. Mildred Couper also wrote incidental music for plays at the Lobero and also a dance-opera, And on Earth Peace, with libretto by Scottish-Argentine artist Malcolm Thurburn.

== Personal life ==
Mildred Cooper married American expatriate artist Richard Hamilton Couper in 1910, and they had two children, Clive (1913-2004) and Rosalind (1915-2016), both born in Rome. At the outbreak of World War I the Coupers moved to New York City. She was widowed soon after, when her husband died during the 1918 influenza pandemic. She died in Santa Barbara, California, in 1974, aged 86 years. Her papers are archived in the Department of Special Collections at the University of California, Santa Barbara.

== Trivia ==
Mildred Cooper's first cousin Harry Norman Jacobs-Hughes (1877-1951) was the grandfather of Argentine-born composer Carlos Micháns-Jacobs (1950-), who resides in the Netherlands since 1982.

A biography of Mildred Cooper-Couper and some music samples are available at https://wingedsun.com/couper-m/
