= Charles Miller (medium) =

American spiritualist medium

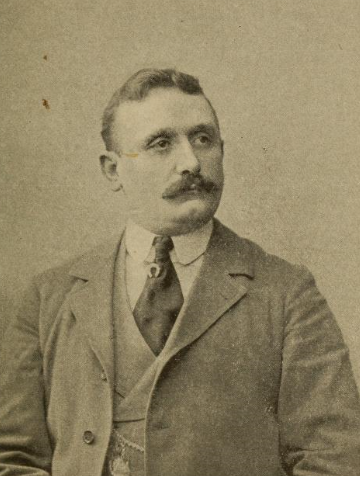
Charles Miller

Charles Victor Miller (1870–1943) was an American spiritualist medium.

Miller was born in Longeville-lès-Saint-Avold, France, but moved to San Francisco where he took up mediumship. Miller produced 'spirit' materializations in and outside his cabinet during séances. He managed to convince several psychical researchers such as Willie Reichel that the manifestations were genuine. Reichel in his book An Occultist's Travels (1908) described witnessing paranormal phenomena at many séances with Miller. However, most researchers were not convinced the materializations were genuine. They noted he only chose favourable conditions to work in, or worked before an audience of his choice which allowed easy opportunity for trickery.

In 1908, Miller was eventually exposed as a fraud. He was invited by spiritualists to Paris but during a séance it was noted that the materialization figures looked very suspicious. When his cabinet was searched, tulle netting and a perfumed cloth were found. Charles Richet commented that Miller was exposed as an "evident fraud".
