= Charles Lichty Miller =

American football player and coach

Biographical details
- Born: December 1, 1887; Lancaster, Pennsylvania, U.S.

Playing career
- 1904–1907: Haverford

Coaching career (HC unless noted)
- 1909: Haverford

Charles Lichty Miller (born December 1, 1887) was an American college football player and coach at Haverford College in Haverford, Pennsylvania.
