= Charles A. Miller (political scientist) =

American author and political scientist (1937–2019)

- Born: October 27, 1937; Washington, D.C., U.S.
- Died: March 22, 2019 (aged 81); New Market, Virginia, U.S.
- Occupations: Professor of Politics and American Studies

Academic background
- Education: Swarthmore College (BA); Harvard University (MA, PhD)

Academic work
- Discipline: Political scientist
- Institutions: Lake Forest College

Charles Allen ("Chuck") Miller (October 27, 1937 – March 22, 2019) was an author and Professor of Politics and American Studies at Lake Forest College.

== Biography ==
Miller received his Bachelor of Arts from Swarthmore College (1959) in political science with highest honors, studied public law at the University of Freiburg in Germany under a Fulbright grant (1959–60), and received Masters of Public Administration and Doctor of Philosophy degrees from Harvard University (1962, 1968). Prior to his career at Lake Forest College (1974–98), he taught at Clark College in Georgia (now Clark Atlanta University; 1967–70) and Princeton University (1970–74).

Among the courses Miller taught or co-taught were constitutional law; civil liberties; the Politics of Aristotle; law and literature; U.S. foreign policy; the political economy of health care; the Jewish Experience in America; Nature in American Life; and courses comparing Justices Holmes and Brandeis; The Federalist and Democracy in America; and The Odyssey and Walden. At Lake Forest College he was instrumental in establishing the Christopher C. Mojekwu Memorial Fund for Intercultural Understanding in honor of a late member of the faculty.

Miller's scholarly passions are reflected in books, essays, reviews and a vast correspondence. His contributions to American intellectual thought are The Supreme Court and the Uses of History (Harvard University Press, 1969), and Jefferson and Nature: An Interpretation (The Johns Hopkins University Press, 1988). He is the author of A Catawba Assembly (Trackaday, 1973) about Camp Catawba, a camp near Blowing Rock, NC, where he spent twelve summers, and the editor of Homer’s Sun Still Shines: Ancient Greek in Essays, Poems, and Translations by Vera Lachmann (Trackaday, 2004), a book about the camp's director. A fascination with literary wordplay and metaphors led to Isn’t that Lewis Carroll? A Guide to the Mimsy Words and Frabjous Quotations of Alice’s Adventures in Wonderland, Through the Looking-Glass, and The Hunting of the Snark (Trackaday, 1984) and Ship of State: The Nautical Metaphors of Thomas Jefferson, With Numerous Examples by other Writers from Classical Antiquity to the Present (University Press of America, 2003).

His essays include "Constitutional Law and the Rhetoric of Race " (1971) and "The Forest of Due Process of Law" (1977). He wrote or edited pamphlets: "African-American Life at Monticello: The Paintings of Nathaniel K. Gibbs" (2002), "The Shenandoah Valley in History and Literature" (2003) for children, a guide to Gilbert and Sullivan's Ruddigore (2007), and Brandeis: The Legacy of a Justice, Marquette University Law Review, vol. 100, iss. 2 (2016)

== Personal life ==
Miller's father was Judge Morris Miller Morris Miller (judge), Chief Judge of the Juvenile Court in the Superior Court of the District of Columbia. His mother, Sara Levy Miller, was a child psychologist, and artist, whose paintings and drawings are reproduced in a book he co-edited, The Art of Sara Miller (Trackaday, 2006). A brother, Tom Miller, was an author and free-lance journalist. Charles Miller lived in the Shenandoah Valley of Virginia with his wife Barbara Brennan, a nurse practitioner. Among his avocations was piano improvisation, begun in his childhood when he took music lessons from Ruth Crawford Seeger.

The Arcola Collection: Chuck Miller, In His Own Words, published in 2024, is part memoir, part scholarly analysis, part cultural adventure. In Miller’s essays on nearly 120 books and other writings, The Arcola Collection reflects his interests and curiosity, from Aristotle to Appalachia, from Lewis Carroll to Lewis and Clark, from Newton to the New Deal.

Miller died of severe oropharyngeal and esophageal dysphagia at the age of 81 on March 22, 2019.
