= Mother (opera) =

Mother, op. 35 (Czech: Matka) is a quarter-tone opera in ten scenes by the Czech composer Alois Hába. It was completed in 1929 to the composer's own libretto; its plot is drawn from the author's native Valašsko. The opera is written in prose.

== Background ==
After Hába successfully resolved instrumental and theoretical problems with the quarter-tone system in the 1920s, he started to compose fully in that style. His work is bi-chromatic and in some folklore-inspired scenes and recitative parts of the score Hába approached to the intonational diction of the folk dialect. In spite of the folklore atmosphere of the work, its music is very independent and entirely original. The opera is strongly connected to Moravian ethnic traditions and takes advantage of local dialect and music.

Daniel Albright describes it as, "a remarkable work: slightly in awe of its own daring, in that Hába seemed more fascinated by the quarter-tone scale themselves than by any melody that might be construed from them, and yet resolute in refusing to employ the small intervals in the expected way, as a resource for denoting pain and disorientation [ expressionism ]," instead Hába intended the opera as a peasant comedy in the tradition of Smetana's Bartered Bride (1866).

== Performance history ==
The work was premiered at the Gärtnerplatztheater in Munich, Germany in May 1931.

== Roles ==
- Křen, the farmer (tenor)
- Maruša, his wife (soprano)
- Francka, one of Křen's children by his first marriage (soprano)
- Nanka, one of Křen's children by his first marriage (mezzo-soprano)
- Maruša, one of Křen's children by his first marriage (soprano)
- Francek, one of Křen's children by his first marriage (tenor)
- Vincek (baritone)
- Maruša's father (bass)
- Sister-in-law (soprano)
- Brother-in-law (bass)
- Priest (tenor)
- First lachrymose old woman (soprano)
- Second lachrymose old woman (soprano)
- Third lachrymose old woman (contralto)
- Fourth lachrymose old woman (contralto)
- First neighbor (tenor)
- Second neighbor (bass)
- Best man (tenor)
- Bridesmaid (soprano)
- Chorus of Village People

== Synopsis ==
In a poor part of Moravia there lives a small farmer Křen with his large family. Hard working Křen toiled his first wife to death and married again. His second wife, Maruša, isn't satisfied with the passion of her husband. With her maternal love, she eventually succeeds in breaking the defiant nature of her husband, accustomed to physical work and satisfaction. She gives birth to children and brings them up according to her idea of "God's will". She becomes the fellow-observer of life, forever regenerating itself, in the similar way as the course of life is conceived by the Christian view of the world.

== Recordings ==
- Alois Hába: Matka (Mother) (Sung in Czech). Prague National Theatre Chorus and Orchestra, cond. Jiří Jirouš, quarter-tone piano Jiří Pokorný, recorded 1964, published 1965, two 12-inch gramophone records, Supraphon 10 8258-2 612
