= Camp Catawba =

Summer camp in North Carolina, US

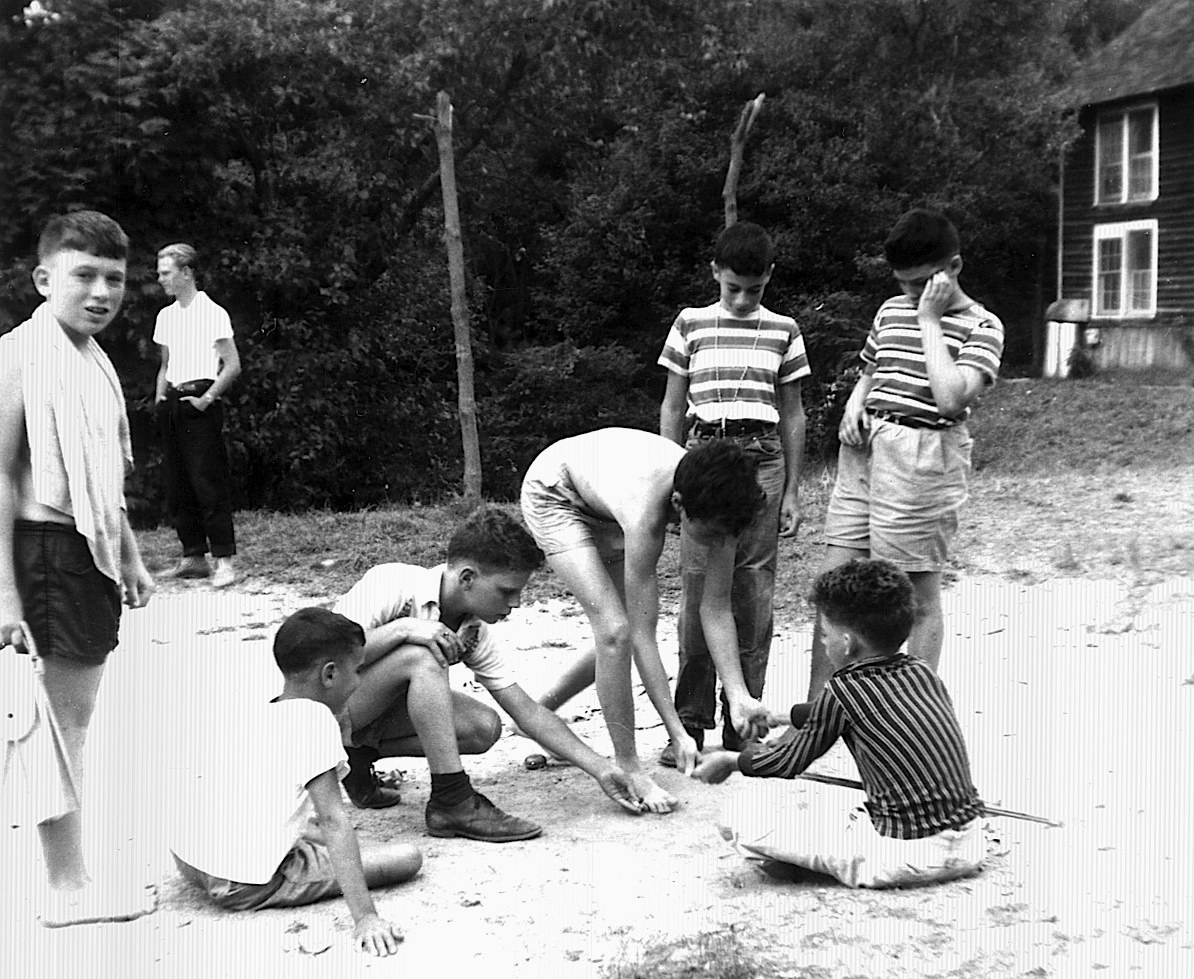
Campers of Camp Catawba

Camp Catawba was a summer camp for boys near the town of Blowing Rock in the Blue Ridge Mountains of North Carolina.

== History ==
It was established in 1944 by educator Vera Lachmann. In 1947, she was joined by the composer Tui St. George Tucker, who was the camp's music director. Camp Catawba closed after the 1970 season. The camp's nearest neighbors and indispensable practical aids were Mr. and Mrs. Ira W. and Sally Lentz Bolick, a mountain farm couple who descended from 18th-century German immigrants to America.

Cash poor but culturally rich, Camp Catawba was guided by Vera Lachmann's idealism, her upbringing in Weimar Germany, and her finding at Catawba a haven from the torment of the Nazi era.

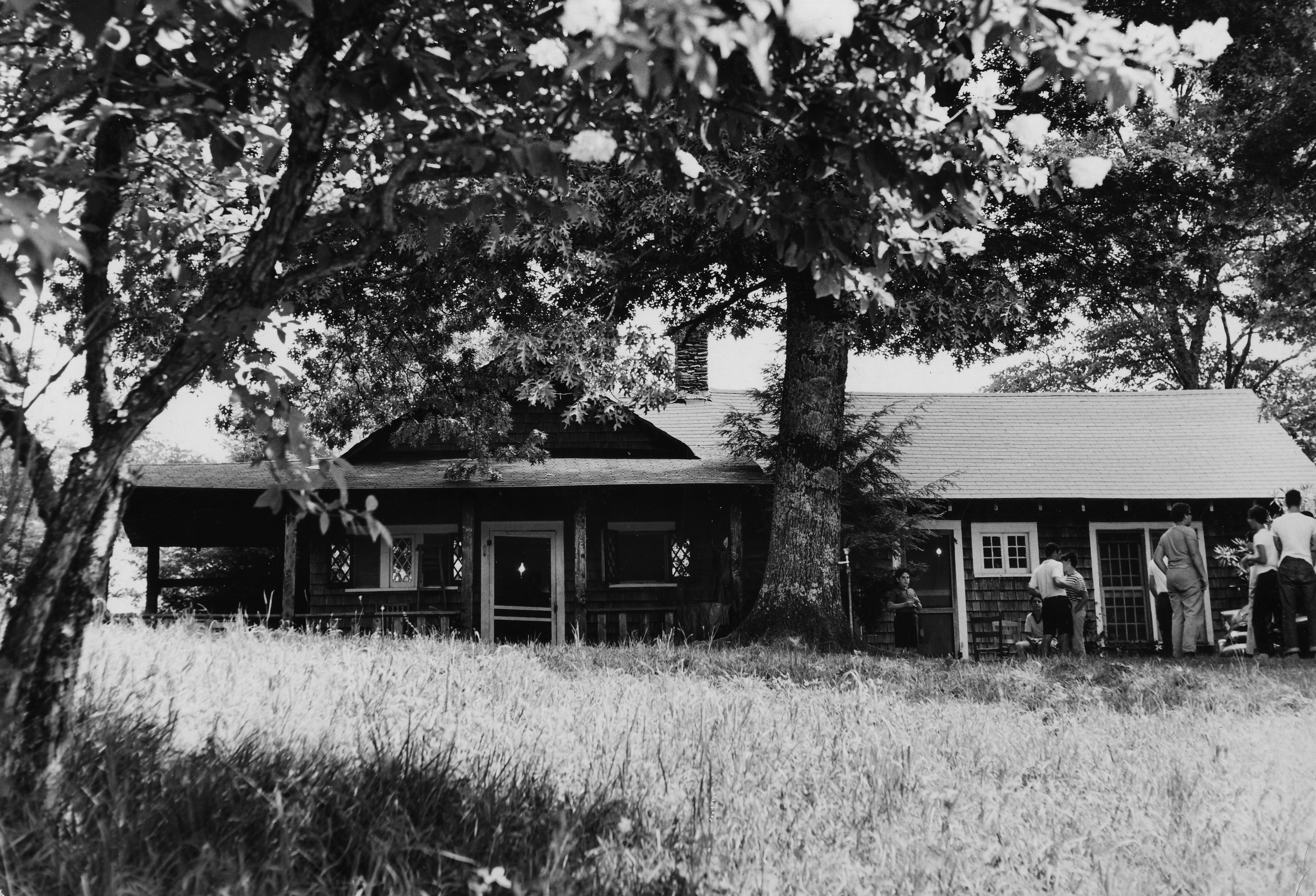
The camp’s central building, a chestnut lodge known as the Mainhouse

Throughout Catawba's 27 summers, most of the campers and many of the staff came from New York City and Washington, DC. In the beginning many of the boys were the sons of parents who, like Lachmann, had fled Nazi Germany. This also meant they were mostly Jewish - though Catawba was decidedly ecumenical and Lachmann read from both the Old and New Testaments at Sunday services. An article from 1951 in The Blowing Rocket, the local weekly newspaper, captures Lachmann's idealism, as well as the anomaly of Catawba in the southern mountains at the time: "There are in the camp today 29 boys from France, Germany, Norway, South American countries, New York and New Jersey, just as a sample of the various nationalities which the camp attracts. Absolutely no race or creed is turned away, and soon possibly color will be no bar to admission to the camp".

The physical heart of the camp was a chestnut lodge, constructed in 1913 before the blight decimated the American chestnut forests of the southern Appalachians. In 1985 the National Park Service purchased the camp grounds from Tui St. George Tucker, who inherited the site from Vera Lachmann, and on Tucker's death the Park Service took possession of the property. As of 2010, Park Service officials are deciding whether to preserve the chestnut lodge and how to interpret the camp to the public.
