= Tui St. George Tucker =

American classical composer (1924-2004)

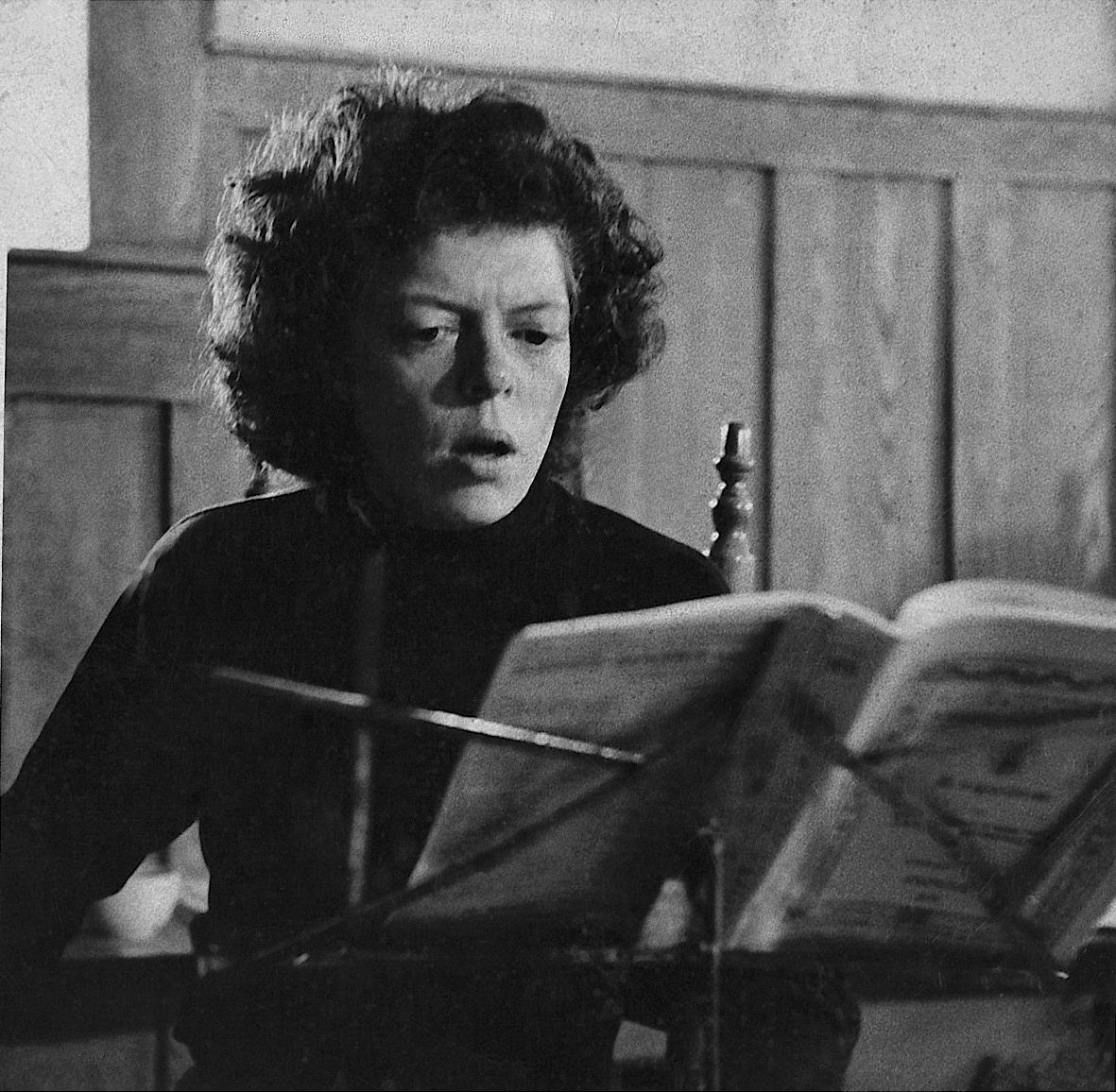
- Photo of Tucker taken at Camp Catawba, North Carolina (c. 1967)
- Born: 25 November 1924; Fullerton, California, U.S.
- Died: 21 April 2004 (aged 79) near Blowing Rock, North Carolina, U.S.
- Education: Occidental College (1941-44)
- Occupations: Composer; conductor; recorder player; music theorist
- Partner: Vera Lachmann (1947-85) (her death)

Signature
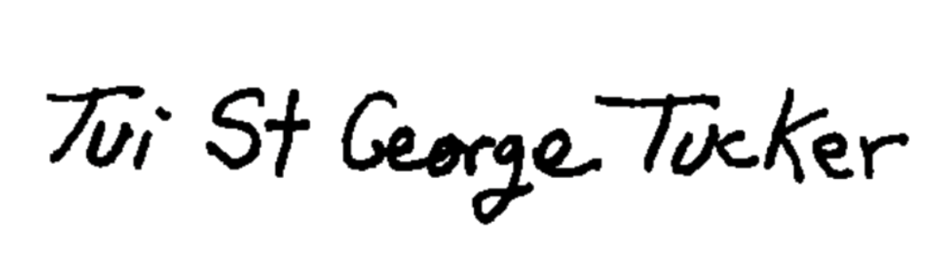

Tui St. George Tucker (Note: Some sources identify her as Tui Saint George Tucker.) (born Lorraine St. George Tucker; November 25, 1924 – April 21, 2004) was an American modernist composer, conductor, recorder virtuoso and creator of unique musical instruments. Her compositions often feature microtonality and are strongly influenced by jazz, Buddhism, the music of Medieval Europe, and more. She developed special recorders with extra holes, in addition to unique fingerings for modern recorders to allow for the playing of quarter tones, typically in 24-tone equal temperament.

Her avant-garde disposition and unique compositional language made her a staple in the 1940s New York scene, being encouraged by musicians such as John Cage and Larry Polansky. After relocating to North Carolina in 1947, however, she fell into obscurity – but continued to write a large number of works for various ensembles. The exact size of her oeuvre is debated, but is believed to comprise around one hundred works, a few being unfinished.

== Early life ==
=== Childhood ===
Tucker was born in Fullerton, California, the daughter of an English father and a mother from New Zealand. Her family often referred to her as "Tui"; named for the eponymous bird native to New Zealand, where her mother was born. She attended Eagle Rock High School in northeast Los Angeles, California, graduating in 1941. She then attended Occidental College in Los Angeles from 1941 to 1944.

== Career ==
Tucker relocated to central New York City in 1946, working as a composer, conductor, and recorder player, and spending most of her professional life in Greenwich Village. She had become a member of a circle of avant-garde composers living in the city, including John Cage, Lou Harrison, Virgil Thomson, and others. Her Indian Summer: Three Microtonal Antiphons on Psalm Texts written during this era, for two baritones and chamber ensemble, was among the first of her pieces to explore the use of quarter tones. Tucker met the German-American poet and scholar Vera Lachmann (1904-1985) in 1946, with whom she had a lifelong relationship.

From 1947 onward, she spent her summers at Camp Catawba, located near the Blue Ridge Parkway on the Boone side of Blowing Rock, North Carolina. Lachmann founded the camp two years prior, and Tucker worked as the camp's music director at Lachmann's request. Under her guidance, the campers performed music ranging from medieval plainsong and organum to works by contemporary American composers. Pianist Grete Sultan also worked there during several summers.

Many of her best known compositions date from this era, including the Peyote Sonata (1956), which experiments with polyrhythms and experimental subdivisions, including a phrase in 15:16; a chamber piece dedicated to Polish composer Krzysztof Penderecki, and the cantata Drum Taps (1973) in eight movements, set to a libretto by Walt Whitman.

== Personal life ==
In 1985, Tui inherited the camp grounds of Catawba from Lachmann after she died the same year. In accordance with Lachmann's will, Tucker sold the grounds to the Blue Ridge Parkway Foundation, while retaining a life estate and maintaining a residence on the grounds from 1985 until her death in 2004, continuing to conduct and compose for local instrumental ensembles.

== Legacy ==
Her works have been performed by people and ensembles including the Kohon Quartet, pianists Grete Sultan and Loretta Goldberg, and recorder player Pete Rose. Her Little Pieces for Quartertone Piano is a standard work in the instrument's repertoire.

== Music ==
=== List of selected works ===
Sorted chronologically:

- Trio for Brass (1940) for two B flat trumpets and F horn
- Duo Sonata (1946) for two soprano recorders
- Partita (1946) for viola solo
- First Piano Sonata (1947; rev. 1979) for piano solo
- The Voice of the Lord (1949) for boy soprano and medieval lute
- Peyote Sonata (1956) for piano solo
- Sonata for Solo Recorder (The Bullfinch) (1960) for soprano recorder
- Passacaglia for White Sunday (1964) for piano solo
- Second Sonata for Solo Recorder (The Hypertonic) (1967) for soprano recorder
- Drum Taps (1973), cantata for men's voices and chamber orchestra
- Quartertone Carol (1980) for female voice and recorder trio
- Quartertone Lullaby (1981) for recorder trio
- Second Quartertone Lullaby (1982) for recorder trio
- Catawba (1984) for baritone and piano
- Adoramus Te (1985) for mixed chorus and piano
- Ave Verum Corpus (1988) for SATB choir
- All Colors of Light (1990) for chorus and piano
- Amoroso 2 (1990) for tenor recorder (or flute)
- The Lydian Sonata (1995) for violin and piano
- Laudate (1996) for SATB choir
- But Parting is Return (1999) for SATB choir

== Discography ==
- Little Pieces for Quartertone Piano [1972]. Elisa Järvi: In tune – tune in! Music for quarter-tone piano. SRDG-1032. Sibarecords 2025.
- Indian Summer: Three Microtonal Antiphons on Psalm Texts. LP. Greenville, Maine: Opus One, [1984?].
- String Quartet No. 1. LP. Greenville, Maine: Opus One, [1986?].
- Herzliebster Jesu. CD. Harriman, New York: Spectrum, 1988. (Title of disc: Buxtehude, Moondog & Co., performed by Paul Jordan, Schuke organ.)
- Piano Sonata No, 2, "The Peyote". CD. Greenville, Maine: Opus One, [1991?]. (Title of disc: Soundbridge, performed by pianist Loretta Goldberg.)
- The Music of Tui St. George Tucker (1998). Baton Rouge, Louisiana: Centaur.
