= Quarter tone =

Musical interval

Quarter tone on C

A quarter tone is a pitch halfway between the usual notes of a chromatic scale or an interval about half as wide (aurally, or logarithmically) as a semitone, which itself is half a whole tone. Quarter tones divide the octave by 50 cents each, and have 24 different pitches.

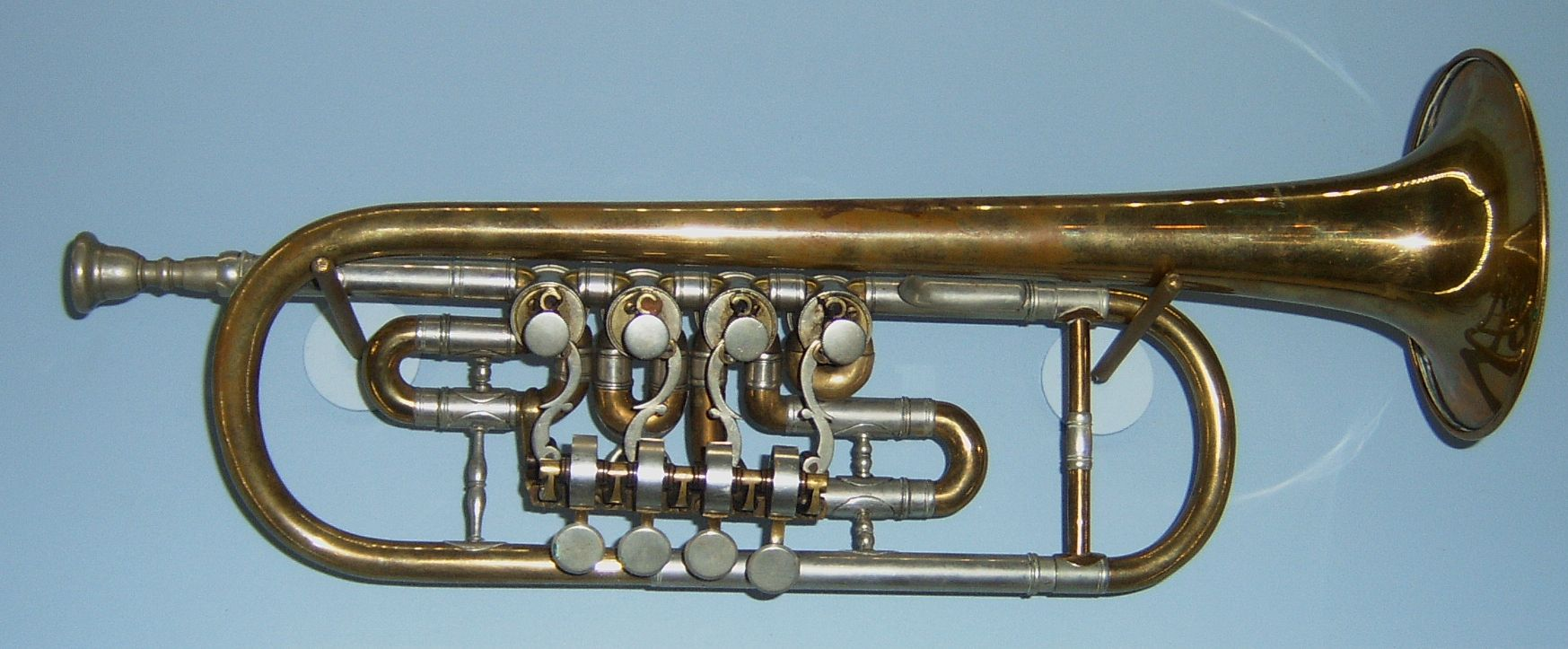
Trumpet with 3 normal valves and a quartering on the extension valve (right)

Quarter tones have their roots in the music of the Middle East and more specifically in Persian traditional music. However, the first evidenced proposal of the equally-tempered quarter tone scale, or 24 equal temperament, was made by 19th-century music theorists Heinrich Richter in 1823 and Mikhail Mishaqa about 1840. Composers who have written music using this scale include: Igor Markevitch, Pierre Boulez, Julián Carrillo, Mildred Couper, George Enescu, Alberto Ginastera, Gérard Grisey, Alois Hába, Thomas Heberer Ljubica Marić, Charles Ives, Tristan Murail, Krzysztof Penderecki, Giacinto Scelsi, Ammar El Sherei, Karlheinz Stockhausen, Tui St. George Tucker, Ivan Wyschnegradsky, Iannis Xenakis, and Seppe Gebruers (See List of quarter tone pieces.)

== Types ==
=== Equal-tempered tuning systems ===
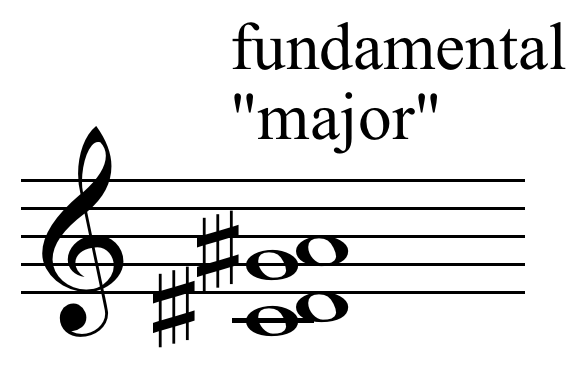
Composer Charles Ives chose the four-note chord above (C–D–G–A) as good possibility for a "fundamental" chord in the quarter-tone scale, akin not to the tonic but to the major chord of traditional tonality.

Neutral second on C

8-tet scale on C

Major second on C

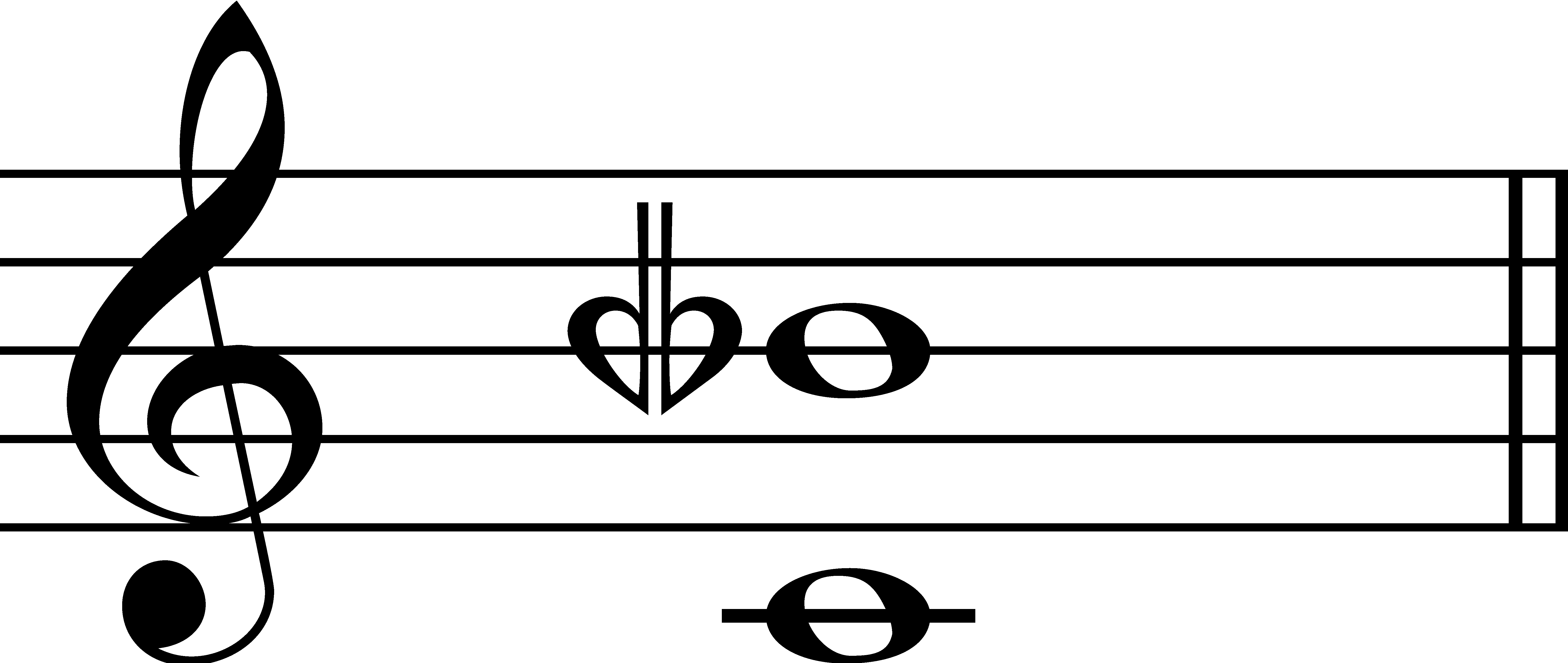
The "subminor seventh": B=A, 19 quarter tones. It approximates the harmonic seventh, B♭. Maneri-Sims notation: B♭

The term quarter tone can refer to a number of different intervals, all very close in size. For example, some 17th- and 18th-century theorists used the term to describe the distance between a sharp and enharmonically distinct flat in mean-tone temperaments (e.g., D♯–E♭). In the quarter-tone scale, also called 24-tone equal temperament (24-TET), the quarter tone is 50 cents, or a frequency ratio of $\sqrt[24]{2}$ or approximately 1.0293, and divides the octave into 24 equal steps (equal temperament). In this scale the quarter tone is the smallest step. A semitone is thus made of two steps, and three steps make a three-quarter tone or neutral second, half of a minor third. The 8-TET scale is composed of three-quarter tones. Four steps make a whole tone.

Quarter tones and intervals close to them also occur in a number of other equally tempered tuning systems. 22-TET contains an interval of 54.55 cents, slightly wider than a quarter-tone, whereas 53-TET has an interval of 22.642 cents, which doubled makes up for over 90% the spectral range of a quarter tone. 72-TET also has equally tempered quarter-tones, and indeed contains three quarter-tone scales, since 72 is divisible by 24. The smallest interval in 31 equal temperament (the "diesis" of 38.71 cents) is half a chromatic semitone, one-third of a diatonic semitone and one-fifth of a whole tone, so it may function as a quarter tone, a fifth-tone or a sixth-tone.

=== Just intonation tuning systems ===
In just intonation the quarter tone can be represented by the septimal quarter tone, 36:35 (48.77 cents), or by the undecimal quarter tone (i.e. the thirty-third harmonic), 33:32 (53.27 cents), approximately half the semitone of 16:15 or 25:24. The ratio of 36:35 is only 1.23 cents narrower than a 24-TET quarter tone. This just ratio is also the difference between a minor third (6:5) and septimal minor third (7:6).

Composer Ben Johnston, to accommodate the just septimal quarter tone, uses a small "7" as an accidental to indicate a note is lowered 49 cents, or an upside down "7" to indicate a note is raised 49 cents, or a ratio of 36:35. Johnston uses an upward and downward arrow to indicate a note is raised or lowered by a ratio of 33:32, or 53 cents. The Maneri-Sims notation system designed for 72-et uses the accidentals and for a quarter tone (36:35 or 48.77 cents) up and down.

== Playing quarter tones ==
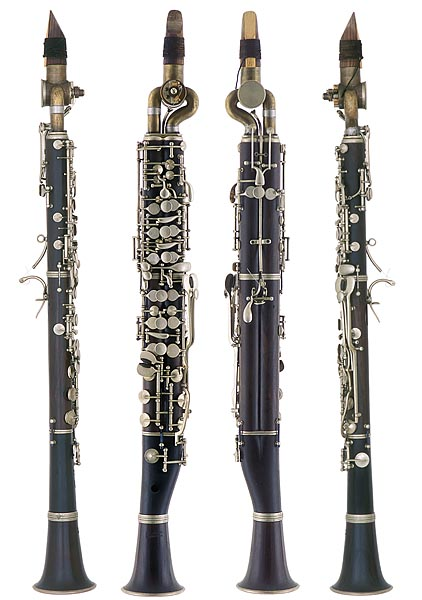
Quarter tone clarinet by Fritz Schüller viewed from four sides.

A quarter tone clarinet was built by Fritz Schüller (1883–1977) of Markneukirchen, and a quarter tone mechanism for flutes by Eva Kingma.

== Music of the Middle East ==
Many Persian dastgah and Arabic maqamat contain intervals of three-quarter tone size; a short list of these follows.

1. Bayati (بیاتی): D E F G A B♭ C D
2. Rast (راست):
  C D E F G A B C (ascending)
  C B A G F E D C (descending)
3. Saba (صبا): D E F G♭ A B♭ C D♭
4. Segah (سه گاه): E F G A B C D E
5. ‘Ajam (عجم)
6. Hoseyni

The Islamic philosopher and scientist Al-Farabi described a number of intervals in his work in music, including a number of quarter tones.

Assyrian/Syriac Church Music Scale:

1. Qadmoyo (Bayati)
2. Trayono (Hussayni)
3. Tlithoyo (Segah)
4. Rbiʿoyo (Rast)
5. Hmishoyo
6. Shtithoyo (ʿAjam)
7. Shbiʿoyo
8. Tminoyo

=== Quarter-tone scale ===
Known as gadwal in Arabic, the quarter-tone scale was developed in the Middle East in the eighteenth century and many of the first detailed writings in the nineteenth century Syria describe the scale as being of 24 equal tones. The invention of the scale is attributed to Mishaqa who wrote a book devoted to the topic but made clear that his teacher, Sheikh Muhammad al-Attar (1764–1828), was one among many already familiar with the concept.

The quarter tone scale may be primarily a theoretical construct in Arabic music. The quarter tone gives musicians a "conceptual map" they can use to discuss and compare intervals by number of quarter tones, and this may be one of the reasons it accompanies a renewed interest in theory, with instruction in music theory a mainstream requirement since that period.

Previously, pitches of a mode were chosen from a scale consisting of seventeen tones, developed by Safi al-Din al-Urmawi in the thirteenth century.

19-Limit just intonation intervals approximated in 24 TET

Composer Charles Ives chose the chord C–D–F–G–B♭ as good possibility for a "secondary" chord in the quarter-tone scale, akin to the minor chord of traditional tonality. He considered that it may be built upon any degree of the quarter tone scale Here is the secondary "minor" and its "first inversion":

== In popular Western music ==
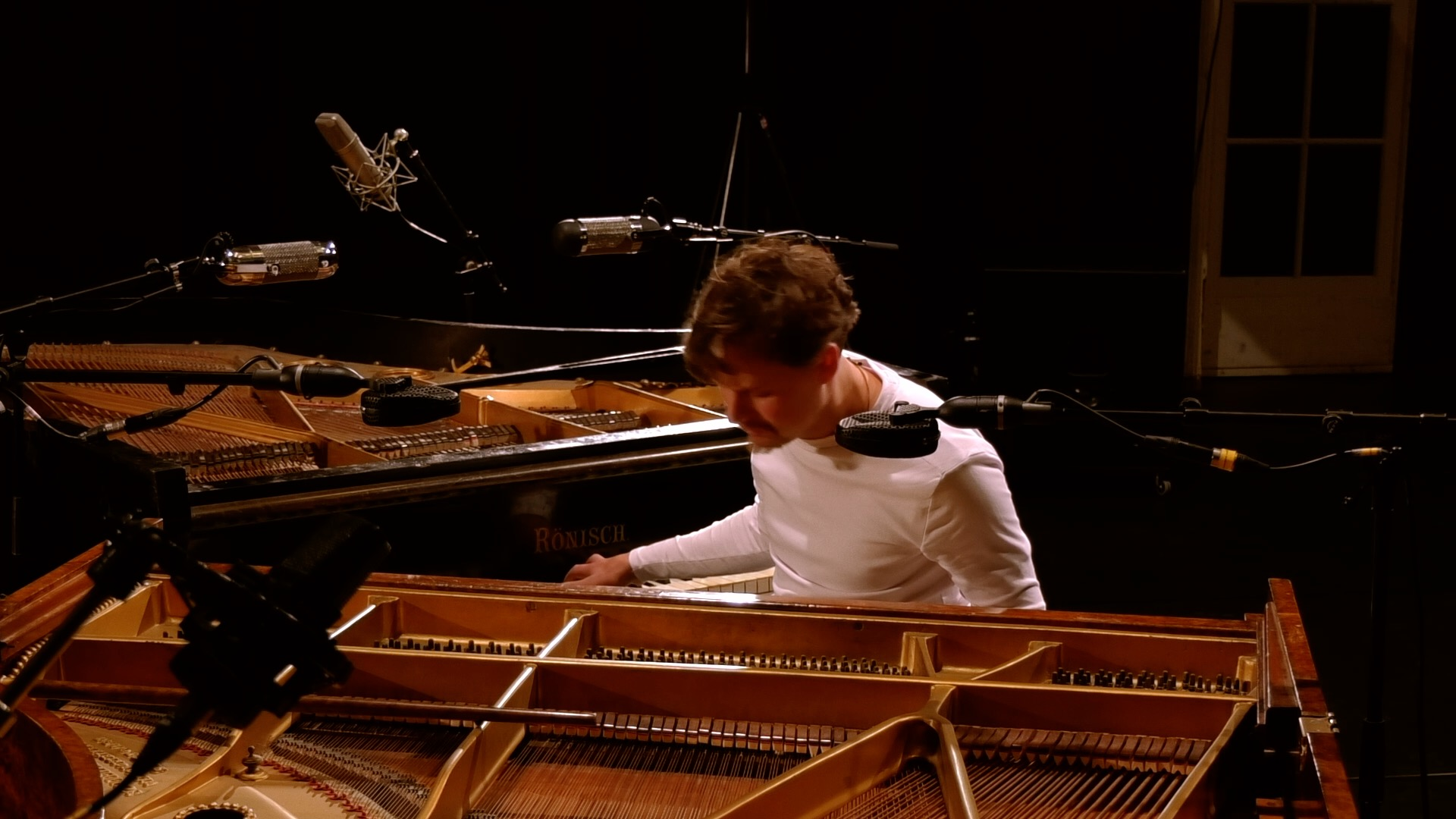
Seppe Gebruers playing with two pianos tuned a quarter-tone apart.

The bass descent of Nancy Sinatra's version of "These Boots Are Made for Walkin'" includes quarter tone descents. Several quarter-tone albums have been recorded by Jute Gyte, a one-man avantgarde black metal band from Missouri, US. Another quartertone metal album was issued by the Swedish band Massive Audio Nerve. Australian psychedelic rock band King Gizzard & the Lizard Wizard's albums Flying Microtonal Banana, K.G., and L.W. heavily emphasize quarter-tones and used a custom-built guitar in 24 TET tuning. Jazz violinist / violist Mat Maneri, in conjunction with his father Joe Maneri, made a crossover fusion album, Pentagon (2005), that featured experiments in hip hop with quarter tone pianos, as well as electric organ and mellotron textures, along with distorted trombone, in a post-Bitches Brew type of mixed jazz / rock.

Later, Seppe Gebruers started playing and improvising with two pianos tuned a quarter-tone apart. In 2019 he started a research project at the Royal Conservatory of Ghent, titled 'Unexplored possibilities of contemporary improvisation and the influence of microtonality in the creation process'. With two pianos tuned a quarter tone apart Gebruers recorded 'The Room: Time & Space' (2018) in a trio formation with drummer Paul Lovens and bassist Hugo Anthunes. In his solo project 'Playing with standards' (album release January 2023), Gebruers plays with famous songs including jazz standards. With Paul Lytton and Nils Vermeulen he forms a 'Playing with standards' trio. In 2026, Quebec rock duet Angine de Poitrine went viral with their performances using 24TET guitar and bass combined in a doubleneck instrument and drumset.

== Ancient Greek tetrachords ==
The enharmonic genus of the Greek tetrachord consisted of a ditone or an approximate major third, and a semitone, which was divided into two microtones. Aristoxenos, Didymos and others presented the semitone as being divided into two approximate quarter tone intervals of about the same size, while other ancient Greek theorists described the microtones resulting from dividing the semitone of the enharmonic genus as unequal in size (i.e., one smaller than a quarter tone and one larger).

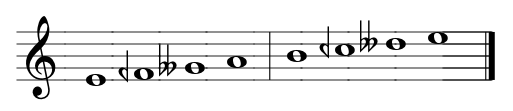
Greek Dorian enharmonic genus: two disjunct tetrachords each of a quarter tone, quarter tone, and major third.

== Interval size in equal temperament ==
Here are the sizes of some common intervals in a 24-note equally tempered scale, with the interval names proposed by Alois Hába (neutral third, etc.) and Ivan Wyschnegradsky (major fourth, etc.):

Interval name	Size (steps)	Size (cents)	MIDI	Just ratio	Just (cents)	MIDI	Error (cents)
octave	24	1200		2:1	1200.00		0.00
semidiminished octave	23	1150		35:18	1151.23		−1.23
supermajor seventh	23	1150		27:14	1137.04		+12.96
major seventh	22	1100		15:8	1088.27		+11.73
neutral seventh, major tone	21	1050		11:6	1049.36		+0.64
neutral seventh, minor tone	21	1050		20:11	1035.00		+15.00
large just minor seventh	20	1000		9:5	1017.60		−17.60
small just minor seventh	20	1000		16:9	996.09		+3.91
supermajor sixth/subminor seventh	19	950		7:4	968.83		−18.83
major sixth	18	900		5:3	884.36		+15.64
neutral sixth	17	850		18:11	852.59		−2.59
minor sixth	16	800		8:5	813.69		−13.69
subminor sixth	15	750		14:9	764.92		−14.92
perfect fifth	14	700		3:2	701.96		−1.96
minor fifth	13	650		16:11	648.68		+1.32
lesser septimal tritone	12	600		7:5	582.51		+17.49
major fourth	11	550		11:8	551.32		−1.32
perfect fourth	10	500		4:3	498.04		+1.96
tridecimal major third	9	450		13:10	454.21		−4.21
septimal major third	9	450		9:7	435.08		+14.92
major third	8	400		5:4	386.31		+13.69
undecimal neutral third	7	350		11:9	347.41		+2.59
minor third	6	300		6:5	315.64		−15.64
septimal minor third	5	250		7:6	266.87		−16.87
tridecimal five-quarter tone	5	250		15:13	247.74		+2.26
septimal whole tone	5	250		8:7	231.17		+18.83
major second, major tone	4	200		9:8	203.91		−3.91
major second, minor tone	4	200		10:9	182.40		+17.60
neutral second, greater undecimal	3	150		11:10	165.00		−15.00
neutral second, lesser undecimal	3	150		12:11	150.64		−0.64
15:14 semitone	2	100		15:14	119.44		−19.44
diatonic semitone, just	2	100		16:15	111.73		−11.73
21:20 semitone	2	100		21:20	84.47		+15.53
28:27 semitone	1	50		28:27	62.96		−12.96
33:32 semitone	1	50		33:32	53.27		−3.27
unison	0	0		1:1	0.00		0.00

Moving from 12-TET to 24-TET allows the better approximation of a number of intervals. Intervals matched particularly closely include the neutral second, neutral third, and (11:8) ratio, or the 11th harmonic. The septimal minor third and septimal major third are approximated rather poorly; the (13:10) and (15:13) ratios, involving the 13th harmonic, are matched very closely. Overall, 24-TET can be viewed as matching the 11th and 13th harmonics more closely than the 7th.

== See also ==
- Musical temperament
- List of quarter tone pieces
- List of meantone intervals
- Holdrian Comma
- Koron, Sori
