= March 16 =

March 16 this year in various calendars
- Monday, 16 March 2026
Akan	Kwadwo
Armenian	29 Areg 1475
Aztec	Huei Tecuilhuitl 5, 1 Ācatl
Babylonian	26 Shabatu, 2336 SE
Balinese pawukon	Luang, Pepet, Beteng, Sri, Paing, Was, Coma of Kelawu, Ludra, Tulus, Duka
Bengali	2 Chaitro, BS 1432
Chinese	Yin Earth Ox・Roof Mansion; Fire Horse Year, Month 1, Day 28 (Jingzhe, 4 days until Chunfen)
Common Era	16 March 2026 CE
Coptic	7 Paremhat, AM 1742
Egyptian	4 Mesori, 2774 NE
Ethiopian	7 Magābit, 2018 Amätä Məhrät
French Republican	Décade III, Sextidi de Ventôse de l'Année 234 de la République
Gregorian	16 March, AD 2026
Hebrew	27 Adar, AM 5786
Hindu	Dhaniṣṭhā・Śiva; Solar: 3 Caitra, 1947 SE; Lunisolar: Dvādaśī, Kṛishna pakṣa of Phālguna, 2082 VE; Rāudra・5126 KY・1,872,650
Icelandic	Mánudagur, 23 Góa 2025
Islamic	27 Ramadan, AH 1447 (using tabular method)
ISO week date	2026-W12-1
Japanese	28 Mutsuki, Reiwa 8 (Keichitsu, 4 days until Shunbun)
Julian	3 March, AD 2026 (AM 7534)
Julian day	2461116
Korean	28 Horangidal, 4359 DE
Maya	13.0.13.7.13; 11 Cumku, 1 Ben
Roman	ante diem V Nonas Martias, MMDCCLXXIX AUC
Solar Hijri	25 Esfand, SH 1404
Tibetan	28 mchu, me pho rta 2153 or 1772 or 1000

<<	March					>>
Su	Mo	Tu	We	Th	Fr	Sa
1	2	3	4	5	6	7
8	9	10	11	12	13	14
15	16	17	18	19	20	21
22	23	24	25	26	27	28
29	30	31
2026

March 16 in recent years
2026 (Monday)
2025 (Sunday)
2024 (Saturday)
2023 (Thursday)
2022 (Wednesday)
2021 (Tuesday)
2020 (Monday)
2019 (Saturday)
2018 (Friday)
2017 (Thursday)

March 16 is the 75th day of the year (76th in leap years) in the Gregorian calendar; 290 days remain until the end of the year.

== Events ==
=== Pre-1600 ===
- 597 BC – The first siege of Jerusalem by the Neo-Babylonian Empire ends with the city surrendering to king Nebuchadnezzar II.
- 445 – Western Roman Emperor Valentinian III is assassinated while practising on the Campus Martius on behalf of Petronius Maximus.
- 1190 – Massacre of Jews at Clifford's Tower, York.
- 1244 – Over 200 Cathars who refuse to recant are burnt to death after the Fall of Montségur.
- 1355 – Amidst the Red Turban Rebellions, Han Lin'er, a claimed descendant of Emperor Huizong of Song, is proclaimed emperor of the restored Song dynasty in Bozhou.

=== 1601–1900 ===
- 1621 – Samoset, an Abenaki, visits the settlers of Plymouth Colony and greets them, "Welcome, Englishmen! My name is Samoset."
- 1660 – The Long Parliament of England is dissolved so as to prepare for the new Convention Parliament.
- 1696 – The Dutch bombard Givet during the Nine Years' War.
- 1792 – King Gustav III of Sweden is shot; he dies on March 29.
- 1802 – The Army Corps of Engineers is established to found and operate the United States Military Academy at West Point.
- 1815 – Prince Willem proclaims himself King of the United Kingdom of the Netherlands, the first constitutional monarch in the Netherlands.
- 1872 – The Wanderers F.C. win the first FA Cup, the oldest football competition in the world, beating Royal Engineers A.F.C. 1–0 at The Oval in Kennington, London.
- 1898 – In Melbourne, the representatives of five colonies adopt a constitution, which would become the basis of the Commonwealth of Australia.

=== 1901–present ===
- 1916 – The 7th and 10th US cavalry regiments under John J. Pershing cross the US–Mexico border to join the hunt for Pancho Villa.
- 1918 – Finnish Civil War: Battle of Länkipohja is infamous for its bloody aftermath as the Whites execute 70–100 capitulated Reds.
- 1924 – In accordance with the Treaty of Rome, Fiume becomes annexed as part of Italy.
- 1925 – An earthquake (measuring around 7.0 magnitude) occurs in Dali, China, killing an estimated 5,000 people.
- 1926 – History of rocketry: Robert Goddard launches the first liquid-fueled rocket, at Auburn, Massachusetts.
- 1935 – Adolf Hitler orders Germany to rearm itself in violation of the Treaty of Versailles. Conscription is reintroduced to form the Wehrmacht.
- 1936 – Warmer-than-normal temperatures rapidly melt snow and ice on the upper Allegheny and Monongahela rivers, leading to a major flood in Pittsburgh.
- 1939 – From Prague Castle, Hitler proclaims Bohemia and Moravia a German protectorate.
- 1941 – Operation Appearance takes place to re-establish British Somaliland.
- 1945 – World War II: The Battle of Iwo Jima ends, but small pockets of Japanese resistance persist.
- 1945 – World War II: Ninety percent of Würzburg, Germany is destroyed in only 20 minutes by British bombers, resulting in at least 4,000 deaths.
- 1962 – Flying Tiger Line Flight 739 disappears in the western Pacific Ocean with all 107 aboard missing and presumed dead.
- 1966 – Launch of Gemini 8 with astronauts Neil Armstrong and David Scott. It would perform the first docking of two spacecraft in orbit.
- 1968 – Vietnam War: My Lai massacre occurs; between 347 and 500 Vietnamese villagers are killed by American troops.
- 1969 – A Viasa McDonnell Douglas DC-9 crashes in Maracaibo, Venezuela, killing 155.
- 1977 – Assassination of Kamal Jumblatt, the main leader of the anti-government forces in the Lebanese Civil War.
- 1978 – Former Italian Prime Minister Aldo Moro is kidnapped; he is later murdered by his captors.
- 1978 – A Balkan Bulgarian Airlines Tupolev Tu-134 crashes near Gabare, Bulgaria, killing 73.
- 1978 – Supertanker Amoco Cadiz splits in two after running aground on the Portsall Rocks, three miles off the coast of Brittany, resulting in the largest oil spill in history at that time.
- 1979 – Sino-Vietnamese War: The People's Liberation Army crosses the border back into China, ending the war.
- 1984 – William Buckley, the CIA station chief in Lebanon, is kidnapped by Hezbollah; he later dies in captivity.
- 1985 – Associated Press newsman Terry Anderson is taken hostage in Beirut; he is not released until December 1991.
- 1988 – Iran–Contra affair: Lieutenant Colonel Oliver North and Vice Admiral John Poindexter are indicted on charges of conspiracy to defraud the United States.
- 1988 – Halabja chemical attack: The Kurdish town of Halabja in Iraq is attacked with a mix of poison gas and nerve agents on the orders of Saddam Hussein, killing 5,000 people and injuring about 10,000 people.
- 1988 – The Troubles: Ulster loyalist militant Michael Stone attacks a Provisional IRA funeral in Belfast with pistols and grenades. Three persons, one of them a member of PIRA, are killed, and more than 60 others are wounded.
- 1995 – Mississippi formally ratifies the Thirteenth Amendment to the United States Constitution, becoming the last state to approve the abolition of slavery. The Thirteenth Amendment was officially ratified in 1865.
- 2001 – A series of bomb blasts in the city of Shijiazhuang, China kill 108 people and injure 38 others, the biggest mass murder in China in decades.
- 2002 – Sofia Gubaidulina's Johannes-Ostern is premiered, together with her earlier Johannes-Passion, at Hamburg's Michaeliskirche, performed by soloists, choir and orchestra from the Mariinsky Theatre combined with NDR choir and orchestra, conducted by Valery Gergiev.
- 2003 – American activist Rachel Corrie is killed in Rafah by being run over by an Israel Defense Forces bulldozer while trying to obstruct the demolition of a home.
- 2005 – Israel officially hands over Jericho to Palestinian control.
- 2010 – The Kasubi Tombs, Uganda's only cultural World Heritage Site, are destroyed in a fire.
- 2012 – Indian cricketer Sachin Tendulkar becomes the first batter in history to score 100 centuries in international cricket.
- 2014 – Crimea votes in a controversial referendum to secede from Ukraine to join Russia.
- 2016 – A bomb detonates in a bus carrying government employees in Peshawar, Pakistan, killing 15 and injuring at least 30.
- 2016 – Two suicide bombers detonate their explosives at a mosque during morning prayer on the outskirts of Maiduguri, Nigeria, killing 24 and injuring 18.
- 2020 – The Dow Jones Industrial Average falls by 2,997.10, the single largest point drop in history and the second-largest percentage drop ever at 12.93%, an even greater crash than Black Monday (1929). This follows the U.S. Federal Reserve announcing that it will cut its target interest rate to 0–0.25%.
- 2021 – Atlanta spa shootings: Eight people are killed and one is injured in a trio of shootings at spas in and near Atlanta, Georgia, U.S. A suspect is arrested the same day.
- 2022 – A 7.4-magnitude earthquake occurs off the coast of Fukushima, Japan, killing 4 people and injuring 225.
- 2022 – Mariupol theatre airstrike during the siege of Mariupol.
- 2025 – A fire breaks out in a nightclub in Kočani, North Macedonia, killing at least 59 people and injuring 155 others.
- 2026 – A series of Boko Haram bombings leave 26 dead and 146 injured in Maiduguri, Nigeria.

== Births ==
=== Pre-1600 ===
- 1399 – The Xuande Emperor, ruler of Ming China (died 1435)
- 1445 – Johann Geiler von Kaysersberg, Swiss priest and theologian (died 1510)
- 1465 – Kunigunde of Austria, Duchess of Bavaria (died 1520)
- 1473 – Henry IV, Duke of Saxony (died 1541)
- 1559 – Amar Singh I, successor of Maharana Pratap of Mewar (died 1620)
- 1581 – Pieter Corneliszoon Hooft, Dutch historian and poet (died 1647)
- 1585 – Gerbrand Bredero, Dutch poet and playwright (died 1618)
- 1590 – Ii Naotaka, Japanese daimyō (died 1659)
- 1596 – Ebba Brahe, Swedish countess (died 1674)

=== 1601–1900 ===
- 1609 – Michael Franck, German poet and composer of hymns (died 1667)
- 1609 – Agostino Mitelli, Italian painter (died 1660)
- 1621 – Georg Neumark, German poet and composer of hymns (died 1681)
- 1631 – René Le Bossu, French literary critic (died 1680)
- 1638 – François Crépieul, Jesuit missionary (died 1702)
- 1654 – Andreas Acoluthus, German scholar (died 1704)
- 1670 – François de Franquetot de Coigny, French general (died 1759)
- 1673 – Jean Bouhier, French jurist and scholar (died 1746)
- 1687 – Sophia Dorothea of Hanover, queen consort of Frederick William I (died 1757)
- 1693 – Malhar Rao Holkar, Indian nobleman (died 1766)
- 1701 – Daniel Lorenz Salthenius, Swedish theologian (died 1750)
- 1729 – Maria Louise Albertine (died 1818)
- 1741 – Carlo Amoretti, Italian scientist (died 1816)
- 1744 – Nicolas-Germain Léonard, Guadeloupean poet and novelist (died 1793)
- 1750 – Caroline Herschel, German-English astronomer (died 1848)
- 1751 – James Madison, American academic and politician, 4th President of the United States (died 1836)
- 1753 – François Amédée Doppet, French general (died 1799)
- 1760 – Johann Heinrich Meyer, Swiss painter and writer (died 1832)
- 1766 – Jean-Frédéric Waldeck, French antiquarian, cartographer, artist and explorer (died 1875)
- 1771 – Antoine-Jean Gros, French painter (died 1835)
- 1773 – Juan Ramón Balcarce, Argentinian general and politician, 6th Governor of Buenos Aires Province (died 1836)
- 1774 – Matthew Flinders, English navigator and cartographer (died 1814)
- 1776 – Johan Gijsbert Verstolk van Soelen, Dutch Minister of Foreign Affairs (died 1845)
- 1789 – Francis Rawdon Chesney, English general and explorer (died 1872)
- 1789 – Georg Ohm, German physicist and mathematician (died 1854)
- 1794 – Ami Boué, Austrian geologist and ethnographer (died 1881)
- 1797 – Alaric Alexander Watts, English poet and journalist (died 1864)
- 1799 – Anna Atkins, English botanist and photographer (died 1871)
- 1800 – Emperor Ninkō of Japan (died 1846)
- 1805 – Ernst von Lasaulx, German philologist and politician (died 1861)
- 1806 – Félix De Vigne, Belgian painter (died 1862)
- 1808 – Hannah T. King, British-born American writer and pioneer (died 1886)
- 1813 – Gaëtan de Rochebouët, French prime minister (died 1899)
- 1819 – José Paranhos, Brazilian politician (died 1880)
- 1820 – Enrico Tamberlik, Italian tenor (died 1889)
- 1821 – Eduard Heine, German mathematician and academic (died 1881)
- 1822 – Rosa Bonheur, French painter and sculptor (died 1899)
- 1822 – John Pope, American general (died 1892)
- 1823 – William Henry Monk, English organist and composer (died 1889)
- 1825 – Camilo Castelo Branco, Portuguese writer (died 1890)
- 1828 – Émile Deshayes de Marcère, French politician (died 1918)
- 1834 – James Hector, Scottish geologist and surgeon (died 1907)
- 1836 – Andrew Smith Hallidie, English-American engineer and inventor (died 1900)
- 1839 – Sully Prudhomme, French poet and critic, Nobel Prize laureate (died 1907)
- 1839 – John Butler Yeats, Irish painter (died 1922)
- 1840 – Shibusawa Eiichi, Japanese industrialist (died 1931)
- 1840 – Georg von der Gabelentz, German linguist and sinologist (died 1893)
- 1845 – Umegatani Tōtarō I, Japanese sumo wrestler, the 15th Yokozuna (died 1928)
- 1846 – Gösta Mittag-Leffler, Swedish mathematician and academic (died 1927)
- 1846 – Rebecca Cole, American physician and social reformer (died 1922)
- 1846 – Jurgis Bielinis, Lithuanian book smuggler (died 1918)
- 1848 – Axel Heiberg, Norwegian financier and diplomat (died 1932)
- 1851 – Otto Bardenhewer, German theologian (died 1935)
- 1851 – Martinus Beijerinck, Dutch microbiologist and botanist (died 1931)
- 1856 – Napoléon, Prince Imperial of France (died 1879)
- 1857 – Charles Harding Firth, English historian (died 1936)
- 1859 – Alexander Stepanovich Popov, Russian physicist and inventor (died 1906)
- 1865 – Patsy Donovan, Irish-American baseball player and manager (died 1953)
- 1869 – Willy Burmester, German violinist (died 1933)
- 1871 – Hans Merensky, South African geologist and philanthropist (died 1951)
- 1871 – Frantz Reichel, French rugby player and hurdler (died 1932)
- 1874 – Frédéric François-Marsal, French prime minister (died 1958)
- 1877 – Léo-Ernest Ouimet, Canadian director and producer (died 1972)
- 1878 – Clemens August Graf von Galen, German cardinal (died 1946)
- 1878 – Paul Jouve, French painter (died 1973)
- 1881 – Fannie Charles Dillon, American composer (died 1947)
- 1882 – James Lightbody, American runner (died 1953)
- 1883 – Ethel Anderson, Australian poet, author, and painter (died 1958)
- 1884 – Eric P. Kelly, American journalist and author (died 1960)
- 1884 – J. Alfred Tanner, Finnish singer and songwriter (died 1927)
- 1885 – Giacomo Benvenuti, Italian composer and musicologist (died 1943)
- 1885 – Sydney Chaplin, English actor (died 1965)
- 1886 – Herbert Lindström, Swedish tug of war player (died 1951)
- 1887 – Emilio Lunghi, Italian runner (died 1925)
- 1887 – S. Stillman Berry, American marine zoologist (1984)
- 1889 – Reggie Walker, South African athlete (died 1951)
- 1892 – César Vallejo, Peruvian poet (died 1938)
- 1895 – Ernest Labrousse, French historian (died 1988)
- 1897 – Antonio Donghi, Italian painter (died 1963)
- 1897 – Conrad Nagel, American actor (died 1970)
- 1900 – Cyril Hume, American novelist and screenwriter (died 1966)
- 1900 – Mencha Karnicheva, Macedonian revolutionary and assassin (died 1964)

=== 1901–present ===
- 1901 – Alexis Chantraine, Belgian footballer (died 1987)
- 1903 – Mike Mansfield, American politician and diplomat, 22nd United States Ambassador to Japan (died 2001)
- 1904 – Buddy Myer, American baseball player (died 1974)
- 1906 – Francisco Ayala, Spanish sociologist, author, and translator (died 2009)
- 1906 – Maurice Turnbull, Welsh-English cricketer and rugby player (died 1944)
- 1906 – Lloyd Waner, American baseball player (died 1982)
- 1906 – Henny Youngman, English-American violinist and comedian (died 1998)
- 1908 – René Daumal, French author and poet (died 1944)
- 1908 – Ernest Rogez, French water polo player (died 1986)
- 1908 – Robert Rossen, American director, producer, and screenwriter (died 1966)
- 1909 – Don Raye, American songwriter (died 1985)
- 1910 – Aladár Gerevich, Hungarian fencer (died 1991)
- 1910 – Iftikhar Ali Khan Pataudi, Indian-English cricketer and politician, 8th Nawab of Pataudi (died 1952)
- 1911 – Pierre Harmel, Belgian lawyer and diplomat, Prime Minister of Belgium (died 2009)
- 1911 – Josef Mengele, German physician, SS captain and mass-murderer (died 1979)
- 1911 – Philip Pavia, American painter and sculptor (died 2005)
- 1912 – Pat Nixon, American teacher, First Lady of the United States (died 1993)
- 1913 – Rémy Raffalli, French soldier (died 1952)
- 1915 – Kunihiko Kodaira, Japanese mathematician (died 1997)
- 1916 – Mercedes McCambridge, American actress (died 2004)
- 1916 – Tsutomu Yamaguchi, Japanese engineer and businessman (died 2010)
- 1917 – Mehrdad Pahlbod, Iranian politician (died 2018)
- 1917 – Laure Pillay, Mauritian lawyer and jurist (died 2017)
- 1917 – Louis C. Wyman, American lawyer and politician (died 2002)
- 1918 – Frederick Reines, American physicist and academic, Nobel Prize laureate (died 1998)
- 1918 – Aldo van Eyck, Dutch architect (died 1999)
- 1920 – John Addison, English-American soldier and composer (died 1998)
- 1920 – Sid Fleischman, American author and screenwriter (died 2010)
- 1920 – Traudl Junge, German secretary (died 2002)
- 1920 – Leo McKern, Australian-English actor (died 2002)
- 1922 – Harding Lemay, American screenwriter and playwright (died 2018)
- 1923 – Heinz Wallberg, German conductor (died 2004)
- 1925 – Cornell Borchers, Lithuanian-German actress and singer (died 2014)
- 1925 – Mary Hinkson, American dancer and choreographer (died 2014)
- 1925 – Ervin Kassai, Hungarian basketball player and referee (died 2012)
- 1925 – Luis E. Miramontes, Mexican chemist and engineer (died 2004)
- 1926 – Charles Goodell, American lawyer and politician (died 1987)
- 1926 – Jerry Lewis, American actor and comedian (died 2017)
- 1927 – Vladimir Komarov, Russian pilot, engineer, and cosmonaut (died 1967)
- 1927 – Daniel Patrick Moynihan, American sociologist and politician, 12th United States Ambassador to the United Nations (died 2003)
- 1927 – Olga San Juan, American actress and dancer (died 2009)
- 1928 – Wakanohana Kanji I, Japanese sumo wrestler, the 45th Yokozuna (died 2010)
- 1928 – Christa Ludwig, German opera singer (died 2021)
- 1929 – Betty Johnson, American singer (died 2022)
- 1929 – Tihomir Novakov, Serbian-American physicist and academic (died 2015)
- 1929 – Nadja Tiller, Austrian actress (died 2023)
- 1930 – Tommy Flanagan, American pianist and composer (died 2001)
- 1930 – Minoru Miki, Japanese composer (died 2011)
- 1931 – Augusto Boal, Brazilian theatre director, writer and politician (died 2009)
- 1931 – Alan Heyman, American-South Korean musicologist and composer (died 2014)
- 1931 – Anthony Kenny, English philosopher and academic (died 2026)
- 1931 – John Munro, Canadian lawyer and politician, 22nd Canadian Minister of Labour (died 2003)
- 1932 – Don Blasingame, American baseball player and manager (died 2005)
- 1932 – Walter Cunningham, American astronaut (died 2023)
- 1932 – Kurt Diemberger, Austrian mountaineer and author
- 1932 – Herbert Marx, Canadian politician (died 2020)
- 1933 – Keith Critchlow, English architect and academic, co-founded Temenos Academy (died 2020)
- 1933 – Sanford I. Weill, American banker, financier, and philanthropist
- 1934 – Jean Cournoyer, Canadian politician
- 1934 – Ray Hnatyshyn, Canadian lawyer and politician, 24th Governor General of Canada (died 2002)
- 1934 – Roger Norrington, English violinist and conductor (died 2025)
- 1934 – Howard Schnellenberger, American football player and coach (died 2021)
- 1935 – Teresa Berganza, Spanish soprano and actress (died 2022)
- 1935 – Pepe Cáceres, Colombian bullfighter (died 1987)
- 1936 – Raymond Vahan Damadian, Armenian-American inventor, invented the MRI (died 2022)
- 1936 – Fred Neil, American folk singer-songwriter and guitarist (died 2001)
- 1937 – David Frith, English historian, journalist, and author
- 1937 – Attilio Nicora, Italian cardinal (died 2017)
- 1937 – Amos Tversky, Israeli-American psychologist and academic (died 1996)
- 1938 – Carlos Bilardo, Argentinian footballer and manager
- 1939 – Yvon Côté, Canadian politician and teacher
- 1940 – Vagif Mustafazadeh, Azerbaijani pianist and composer (died 1979)
- 1940 – Jan Pronk, Dutch academic and politician, Dutch Ministry of Housing, Spatial Planning and the Environment
- 1940 – Keith Rowe, English guitarist
- 1940 – Kaak, Indian cartoonist (died 2025)
- 1941 – Bernardo Bertolucci, Italian director and screenwriter (died 2018)
- 1941 – Robert Guéï, Ivorian soldier and politician, 3rd President of Côte d'Ivoire (died 2002)
- 1941 – Chuck Woolery, American game show host and television personality (died 2024)
- 1942 – Roger Crozier, Canadian-American ice hockey player (died 1996)
- 1942 – Jean-Pierre Schosteck, French politician
- 1942 – James Soong, Chinese-Taiwanese politician, Governor of Taiwan Province
- 1942 – Gijs van Lennep, Dutch race car driver
- 1942 – Jerry Jeff Walker, American singer-songwriter and guitarist (died 2020)
- 1943 – Álvaro de Soto, Peruvian diplomat
- 1943 – Ursula Goodenough, American biologist, zoologist, and author
- 1943 – Hans Heyer, German race car driver
- 1943 – Harry van Hoof, Dutch conductor, composer, and music arranger (died 2024)
- 1944 – Andrew S. Tanenbaum, American computer scientist and academic
- 1945 – Douglas Ahlstedt, American tenor (died 2023)
- 1946 – Sigmund Groven, Norwegian harmonica player and composer
- 1946 – Mary Kaldor, English economist and academic
- 1946 – J. Z. Knight, American New Age teacher and author
- 1946 – Guesch Patti, French singer
- 1948 – Michael Owen Bruce, American singer-songwriter and guitarist
- 1948 – Richard Desjardins, Canadian singer-songwriter and director
- 1948 – Catherine Quéré, French politician
- 1949 – Erik Estrada, American actor
- 1949 – Victor Garber, Canadian actor and singer
- 1949 – Elliott Murphy, American-French singer-songwriter and journalist
- 1950 – Peter Forster, English bishop
- 1950 – Kate Nelligan, Canadian actress
- 1950 – Edhem Šljivo, Bosnian footballer
- 1951 – Ray Benson, American singer-songwriter, guitarist, and producer
- 1951 – Abdelmajid Bourebbou, Algerian footballer
- 1951 – Oddvar Brå, Norwegian skier
- 1951 – Joe DeLamielleure, American football player
- 1951 – Alexandre Gonzalez, French long-distance runner
- 1953 – Claus Peter Flor, German conductor
- 1953 – Isabelle Huppert, French actress
- 1953 – Rainer Knaak, German chess player
- 1953 – Richard Stallman, American computer scientist and programmer
- 1954 – David Heath, English politician
- 1954 – Colin Ireland, English serial killer (died 2012)
- 1954 – Jimmy Nail, English singer-songwriter, guitarist, and actor
- 1954 – Tim O'Brien, American singer-songwriter and guitarist
- 1954 – Dav Whatmore, Sri Lankan-Australian cricketer and coach
- 1954 – Nancy Wilson, American singer-songwriter, guitarist, producer, and actress
- 1955 – Svetlana Alexeeva, Russian ice dancer and coach
- 1955 – Rimantas Astrauskas, Lithuanian physicist
- 1955 – Bruno Barreto, Brazilian director, producer, and screenwriter
- 1955 – Linda Lepomme, Belgian actress and singer
- 1955 – Bob Ley, American sports anchor and reporter
- 1955 – Andy Scott, Canadian politician (died 2013)
- 1955 – Jiro Watanabe, Japanese boxer
- 1956 – Ozzie Newsome, American football player and executive
- 1956 – Clifton Powell, American actor, director, and producer
- 1956 – Yoriko Shono, Japanese writer
- 1956 – Eveline Widmer-Schlumpf, Swiss lawyer and politician
- 1958 – Jorge Ramos, Mexican-American journalist and author
- 1958 – Phillip Wilcher, Australian pianist and composer
- 1958 – Kate Worley, American author (died 2004)
- 1959 – Michael J. Bloomfield, American astronaut
- 1959 – Sebastian Currier, American composer and educator
- 1959 – Greg Dyer, Australian cricketer
- 1959 – Flavor Flav, American rapper and actor
- 1959 – Charles Hudson, American baseball player
- 1959 – Steve Marker, American musician
- 1959 – Jens Stoltenberg, Norwegian economist and politician, 27th Prime Minister of Norway, 13th Secretary General of NATO
- 1959 – Scott L. Schwartz, American actor stuntman and wrestler (died 2024)
- 1960 – Jenny Eclair, English comedian, actress and screenwriter
- 1960 – John Hemming, English businessman and politician
- 1960 – Duane Sutter, Canadian ice hockey player and coach
- 1961 – Todd McFarlane, Canadian author, illustrator, and businessman, founded McFarlane Toys
- 1962 – Franck Fréon, French race car driver
- 1962 – Liliane Gaschet, French athlete
- 1963 – Jerome Flynn, English actor and singer
- 1963 – Kevin Smith, New Zealand actor and singer (died 2002)
- 1964 – Patty Griffin, American singer-songwriter
- 1964 – Jaclyn Jose, Filipino actress (died 2024)
- 1964 – Pascal Richard, Swiss racing cyclist
- 1964 – Gore Verbinski, American director, producer, and screenwriter
- 1965 – Steve Armstrong, American wrestler
- 1965 – Sergei Bazarevich, Russian basketball player and coach
- 1965 – Cindy Brown, American basketball player
- 1965 – Mark Carney, Canadian economist and politician, Prime Minister of Canada
- 1965 – Cristiana Reali, Italian-Brazilian actress
- 1966 – H.P. Baxxter, German musician
- 1966 – Chrissy Redden, Canadian cross-country cyclist
- 1967 – Tracy Bonham, American singer and violinist
- 1967 – John Darnielle, American musician and novelist
- 1967 – Lauren Graham, American actress and producer
- 1967 – Ronnie McCoury, American bluegrass mandolin player, singer and songwriter
- 1967 – Heidi Zurbriggen, Swiss alpine skier
- 1969 – Judah Friedlander, American comedian and actor
- 1969 – Ottis Gibson, Barbadian cricketer and coach
- 1969 – Alina Ivanova, Russian athlete
- 1969 – Evangelos Koronios, Greek basketball player and coach
- 1970 – Joakim Berg, Swedish singer-songwriter and guitarist
- 1971 – Greg Johnson, Canadian ice hockey player (died 2019)
- 1971 – Alan Tudyk, American actor
- 1972 – Ismaïl Sghyr, French-Moroccan long-distance runner
- 1973 – Tim Kang, American actor
- 1973 – Andrey Mizurov, Kazakhstani road bicycle racer
- 1973 – Vonda Ward, American boxer
- 1974 – Georgios Anatolakis, Greek footballer and politician
- 1974 – Anne Charrier, French actress
- 1974 – Heath Streak, Zimbabwean cricketer (died 2023)
- 1975 – Luciano Castro, Argentine actor
- 1975 – Sienna Guillory, English model and actress
- 1975 – Lionel Torres, French archer
- 1976 – Blu Cantrell, American singer-songwriter and producer
- 1976 – Zhu Chen, Qatari chess Grandmaster
- 1976 – Kim Johnsson, Swedish ice hockey player
- 1976 – Leila Lejeune, French handballer
- 1976 – Susanne Ljungskog, Swedish cyclist
- 1976 – Abraham Núñez, Dominican baseball player
- 1977 – Mónica Cruz, Spanish actress and dancer
- 1977 – Thomas Rupprath, German swimmer
- 1978 – Brooke Burns, American fashion model, television personality, and actress
- 1978 – Annett Renneberg, German actress and singer
- 1979 – Tyler Arnason, American ice hockey player
- 1979 – Hee-seop Choi, South Korean baseball player
- 1979 – Christina Liebherr, Swiss equestrian
- 1979 – Rashad Moore, American football player
- 1979 – Sébastien Ostertag, French handball player
- 1979 – Leena Peisa, Finnish keyboard player and songwriter
- 1979 – Andrei Stepanov, Estonian footballer
- 1980 – Todd Heap, American football player
- 1980 – Felipe Reyes, Spanish basketball player
- 1981 – Andrew Bree, Irish swimmer
- 1981 – Danny Brown, American rapper
- 1981 – Curtis Granderson, American baseball player
- 1982 – Julia Letlow, American politician
- 1981 – Julien Mazet, French road bicycle racer
- 1981 – Fabiana Murer, Brazilian pole vaulter
- 1982 – Miguel Comminges, Guadeloupean footballer
- 1982 – Riley Cote, Canadian ice hockey player and coach
- 1982 – Jesús Del Nero, Spanish road bicycle racer
- 1982 – Brian Wilson, American baseball player
- 1983 – Stephen Drew, American baseball player
- 1983 – Brandon League, American baseball player
- 1983 – Nicolas Rousseau, French road bicycle racer
- 1983 – Tramon Williams, American football player
- 1984 – Aisling Bea, Irish comedienne and actress
- 1984 – Levi Brown, American football player
- 1984 – Sharon Cherop, Kenyan long-distance runner
- 1984 – Hosea Gear, New Zealand rugby player
- 1984 – Brandon Prust, Canadian ice hockey player
- 1985 – Teddy Atine-Venel, French athlete
- 1985 – Eddy Lover, Panamanian singer-songwriter
- 1985 – Aleksei Sokirskiy, Russian hammer thrower
- 1986 – Alexandra Daddario, American actress
- 1986 – Toney Douglas, American basketball player
- 1986 – Kenny Dykstra, American wrestler
- 1986 – T. J. Jordan, American basketball player
- 1986 – Boaz Solossa, Indonesian footballer
- 1986 – Daisuke Takahashi, Japanese figure skater
- 1987 – Fabien Lemoine, French football player
- 1988 – Jhené Aiko, American singer-songwriter and rapper
- 1988 – Jessica Gregg, Canadian speed skater
- 1988 – Patrick Herrmann, German footballer
- 1988 – Agustín Marchesín, Argentinian footballer
- 1988 – Jiří Tlustý, Czech ice hockey player
- 1989 – Blake Griffin, American basketball player
- 1989 – Jung So-min, South Korean actress
- 1989 – Magalie Pottier, French racing cyclist
- 1989 – Theo Walcott, English footballer
- 1990 – Josh Johnson, American comedian and writer
- 1990 – Andre Young, American basketball player
- 1991 – Chris Boswell, American football player
- 1991 – Reggie Bullock, American basketball player
- 1991 – Admir Mehmedi, Swiss footballer
- 1991 – Wolfgang Van Halen, American bassist
- 1992 – Tim Hardaway Jr., American basketball player
- 1992 – Brett Davern, American actor
- 1993 – George Ford, English rugby union player
- 1993 – Marine Lorphelin, French model and beauty queen, Miss France 2013
- 1994 – Camilo, Colombian singer
- 1994 – Joel Embiid, Cameroonian basketball player
- 1994 – Sierra McClain, American actress
- 1995 – Inga Janulevičiūtė, Lithuanian figure skater
- 1996 – Ajiona Alexus, American actress and singer
- 1996 – Ivan Toney, English footballer
- 1996 – Tim David, Singaporean-born Australian cricketer
- 1997 – Dominic Calvert-Lewin, English footballer
- 1997 – Florian Neuhaus, German footballer
- 1997 – Tyrel Jackson Williams, American actor
- 1999 – Vladimir Guerrero Jr., Canadian baseball player
- 2000 – Jalen Smith, American basketball player
- 2001 – Kyle Hamilton, American football player

== Deaths ==
=== Pre-1600 ===
- AD 37 – Tiberius, Roman emperor (born 42 BC)
- 455 – Valentinian III, Roman emperor (assassinated; b. 419)
- 455 – Heraclius, Roman courtier (primicerius sacri cubiculi )
- 842 – Xiao Mian, chancellor of the Tang dynasty
- 933 – Takin al-Khazari, Egyptian commander and politician, Abbasid Governor of Egypt
- 943 – Pi Guangye, Chinese official and chancellor (born 877)
- 1021 – Heribert of Cologne, German archbishop and saint (born 970)
- 1072 – Adalbert of Hamburg, German archbishop (born 1000)
- 1181 – Henry I, Count of Champagne
- 1185 – Baldwin IV of Jerusalem (born 1161)
- 1279 – Jeanne of Dammartin, Queen consort of Castile and León (born 1216)
- 1405 – Margaret III, Countess of Flanders (born 1350)
- 1410 – John Beaufort, 1st Earl of Somerset, French-English admiral and politician, Lord Warden of the Cinque Ports (born 1373)
- 1457 – Ladislaus Hunyadi, Hungarian politician (born 1433)
- 1485 – Anne Neville, Queen Consort of Richard III of England (born 1456)
- 1559 – Anthony St. Leger, English-Irish politician Lord Deputy of Ireland (born 1496)

=== 1601–1900 ===
- 1649 – Jean de Brébeuf, French-Canadian missionary and saint (born 1593)
- 1679 – John Leverett, English general and politician, 19th Governor of the Massachusetts Bay Colony (born 1616)
- 1698 – Leonora Christina Ulfeldt, Danish countess, author of Jammers Minde (born 1621)
- 1721 – James Craggs the Elder, English politician, Postmaster General of the United Kingdom (born 1657)
- 1736 – Giovanni Battista Pergolesi, Italian composer (born 1710)
- 1737 – Benjamin Wadsworth, American minister and academic (born 1670)
- 1738 – George Bähr, German architect, designed the Dresden Frauenkirche (born 1666)
- 1747 – Christian August, Prince of Anhalt-Zerbst (born 1690)
- 1804 – Henrik Gabriel Porthan, Finnish professor and historian (born 1739)
- 1838 – Nathaniel Bowditch, American ocean navigator and mathematician (born 1773)
- 1841 – Félix Savart, French physicist and psychologist (born 1791)
- 1868 – David Wilmot, American politician, sponsor of Wilmot Proviso (born 1814)
- 1884 – Art Croft, American baseball player (born 1855)
- 1888 – Hippolyte Carnot, French politician (born 1801)
- 1892 – Samuel F. Miller, American politician (born 1827)
- 1898 – Aubrey Beardsley, English author and illustrator (born 1872)
- 1899 – Joseph Medill, American journalist and politician, 26th Mayor of Chicago (born 1823)

=== 1901–present ===
- 1903 – Roy Bean, American justice of the peace (born 1825)
- 1907 – John O'Leary, Irish republican and journalist (born 1830)
- 1912 – Max Burckhard, Austrian theater director (born 1854)
- 1914 – Gaston Calmette, French journalist (born 1858)
- 1914 – Charles Albert Gobat, Swiss lawyer and politician, Nobel Prize laureate (born 1843)
- 1914 – John Murray, Scottish oceanographer, biologist, and limnologist (born 1841)
- 1925 – August von Wassermann, German bacteriologist and hygienist (born 1866)
- 1930 – Miguel Primo de Rivera, Spanish general and politician, Prime Minister of Spain (born 1870)
- 1935 – John Macleod, Scottish physician and physiologist, Nobel Prize laureate (born 1876)
- 1935 – Aron Nimzowitsch, Latvian-Danish chess player (born 1886)
- 1936 – Marguerite Durand, French actress, journalist, and activist (born 1864)
- 1937 – Austen Chamberlain, English politician, Secretary of State for Foreign and Commonwealth Affairs, Nobel Prize laureate (born 1863)
- 1937 – Alexander von Staël-Holstein, Estonian orientalist and sinologist (born 1877)
- 1940 – Selma Lagerlöf, Swedish author and academic, Nobel Prize laureate (born 1858)
- 1945 – Börries von Münchhausen, German poet (born 1874)
- 1955 – Nicolas de Staël, French-Russian painter and illustrator (born 1914)
- 1957 – Constantin Brâncuși, Romanian-French sculptor, painter, and photographer (born 1876)
- 1958 – Leon Cadore, American baseball player (born 1891)
- 1961 – Chen Geng, Chinese general and politician (born 1903)
- 1961 – Václav Talich, Czech violinist and conductor (born 1883)
- 1963 – Laura Adams Armer, American author and photographer (born 1874)
- 1965 – Alice Herz, German activist (born 1882)
- 1967 – Thomas MacGreevy, Irish poet (born 1893)
- 1968 – Mario Castelnuovo-Tedesco, Italian-American pianist and composer (born 1895)
- 1968 – Gunnar Ekelöf, Swedish poet and translator (born 1907)
- 1970 – Tammi Terrell, American singer (born 1945)
- 1971 – Bebe Daniels, American actress (born 1901)
- 1971 – Thomas E. Dewey, American lawyer and politician, 47th Governor of New York (born 1902)
- 1972 – Pie Traynor, American baseball player (born 1898)
- 1975 – T-Bone Walker, American singer-songwriter and guitarist (born 1910)
- 1977 – Kamal Jumblatt, Lebanese lawyer and politician (born 1917)
- 1979 – Jean Monnet, French economist and politician (born 1888)
- 1983 – Arthur Godfrey, American actor and television host (born 1903)
- 1983 – Fred Rose, Polish-Canadian politician (born 1907)
- 1985 – Roger Sessions, American composer, critic, and educator (born 1896)
- 1985 – Eddie Shore, Canadian-American ice hockey player (born 1902)
- 1988 – Jigger Statz, American baseball player (born 1897)
- 1988 – Mickey Thompson, American race car driver (born 1928)
- 1990 – Ernst Bacon, American pianist, composer, and conductor (born 1898)
- 1991 – Chris Austin, American country singer (born 1964)
- 1991 – Jean Bellette, Australian artist (born 1908)
- 1992 – Yves Rocard, French physicist and engineer (born 1903)
- 1994 – Eric Show, American baseball player (born 1956)
- 1998 – Derek Barton, English-American chemist and academic, Nobel Prize laureate (born 1918)
- 1998 – Esther Bubley, American photographer (born 1921)
- 1999 – Gratien Gélinas, Canadian actor, director, and playwright (born 1909)
- 2000 – Thomas Ferebee, American colonel and pilot (born 1918)
- 2000 – Pavel Prudnikau, Belarusian poet and author (born 1911)
- 2000 – Michael Starr, Canadian judge and politician, 16th Canadian Minister of Labour (born 1910)
- 2000 – Carlos Velázquez, Puerto Rican pitcher (born 1948)
- 2001 – Bob Wollek, French race car driver (born 1943)
- 2003 – Rachel Corrie, American activist (born 1979)
- 2003 – Ronald Ferguson, English captain, polo player, and manager (born 1931)
- 2004 – Vilém Tauský, Czech conductor and composer (born 1910)
- 2005 – Todd Bell, American football player (born 1958)
- 2005 – Ralph Erskine, English architect, designed The London Ark (born 1914)
- 2005 – Dick Radatz, American baseball player (born 1937)
- 2007 – Manjural Islam Rana, Bangladeshi cricketer (born 1984)
- 2008 – Bill Brown, Australian cricketer and soldier (born 1912)
- 2008 – Ivan Dixon, American actor, director, and producer (born 1931)
- 2008 – Gary Hart, American wrestler and manager (born 1942)
- 2010 – Ksenija Pajčin, Serbian singer, dancer and model (born 1977)
- 2011 – Richard Wirthlin, American religious leader (born 1931)
- 2012 – Donald E. Hillman, American colonel and pilot (born 1918)
- 2012 – Takaaki Yoshimoto, Japanese poet, philosopher, and critic (born 1924)
- 2013 – Jamal Nazrul Islam, Bangladeshi physicist and cosmologist (born 1939)
- 2013 – José Alfredo Martínez de Hoz, Argentinian economist and politician, Minister of Economy of Argentina (born 1925)
- 2013 – Yadier Pedroso, Cuban pitcher (born 1986)
- 2013 – Ruchoma Shain, American-born teacher and author (born 1914)
- 2013 – Marina Solodkin, Russian-Israeli academic and politician (born 1952)
- 2013 – Frank Thornton, English actor (born 1921)
- 2014 – Gary Bettenhausen, American race car driver (born 1941)
- 2014 – Donald Crothers, American chemist and academic (born 1937)
- 2014 – Yulisa Pat Amadu Maddy, Sierra Leonean author, poet, and playwright (born 1936)
- 2014 – Steve Moore, English author and illustrator (born 1949)
- 2014 – Alexander Pochinok, Russian economist and politician (born 1958)
- 2015 – Jack Haley, American basketball player and sportscaster (born 1964)
- 2015 – Don Robertson, American pianist and composer (born 1922)
- 2016 – Alexander Esenin-Volpin, Russian-American mathematician and poet (born 1924)
- 2016 – Frank Sinatra Jr., American singer and actor (born 1944)
- 2017 – Lewis Rowland, American neurologist (born 1925)
- 2018 – Louise Slaughter, Member of the U.S. House of Representatives from New York (born 1929)
- 2019 – Dick Dale, American surf-rock guitarist, singer, and songwriter (born 1937)
- 2025 – Émilie Dequenne, Belgian actress (born 1981)
- 2025 – Jesse Colin Young, American singer and songwriter (born 1941)

== Holidays and observances ==
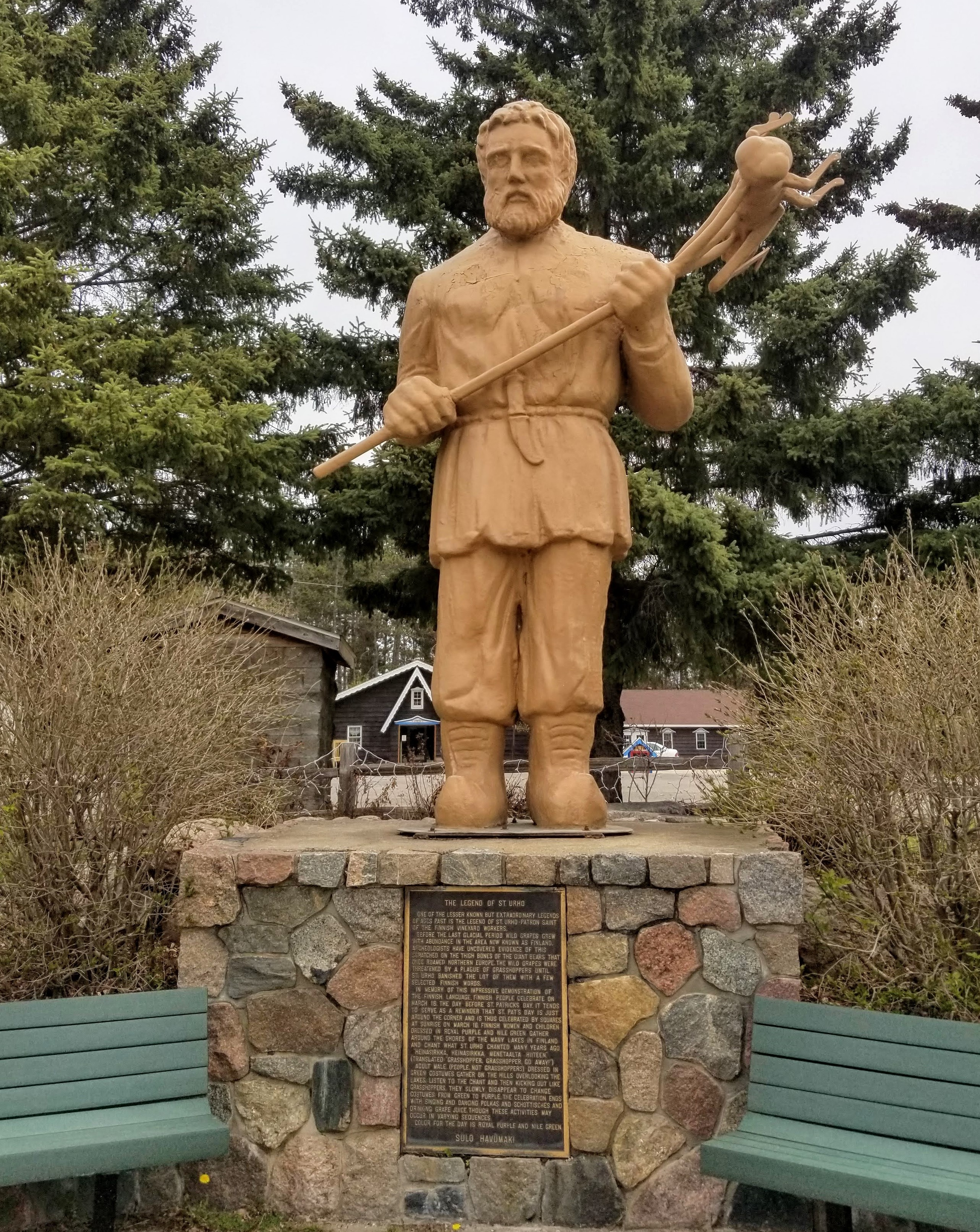
Saint Urho

- Christian feast day:
  - Eusebia of Hamage
  - Finian Lobhar (Finian the Leper)
  - Heribert of Cologne
  - Hilarius of Aquileia
  - Jean de Brébeuf
  - Blessed John Amias and Robert Dalby
  - Julian of Antioch
  - March 16 (Eastern Orthodox liturgics)
- Day of the Book Smugglers (Lithuania)
- Remembrance day of the Latvian legionnaires (Latvia)
- Saint Urho's Day (Finnish Americans and Finnish Canadians)
