= 1638 =

1638 in various calendars
- Gregorian calendar: 1638; MDCXXXVIII
- Ab urbe condita: 2391
- Armenian calendar: 1087; ԹՎ ՌՁԷ
- Assyrian calendar: 6388
- Balinese saka calendar: 1559–1560
- Bengali calendar: 1044–1045
- Berber calendar: 2588
- English Regnal year: 13 Cha. 1 – 14 Cha. 1
- Buddhist calendar: 2182
- Burmese calendar: 1000
- Byzantine calendar: 7146–7147
- Chinese calendar: 丁丑年 (Fire Ox); 4335 or 4128 — to — 戊寅年 (Earth Tiger); 4336 or 4129
- Coptic calendar: 1354–1355
- Discordian calendar: 2804
- Ethiopian calendar: 1630–1631
- Hebrew calendar: 5398–5399
- Hindu calendars
- Vikram Samvat: 1694–1695
- Shaka Samvat: 1559–1560
- Kali Yuga: 4738–4739
- Holocene calendar: 11638
- Igbo calendar: 638–639
- Iranian calendar: 1016–1017
- Islamic calendar: 1047–1048
- Japanese calendar: Kan'ei 15 (寛永１５年)
- Javanese calendar: 1559–1560
- Julian calendar: Gregorian minus 10 days
- Korean calendar: 3971
- Minguo calendar: 274 before ROC 民前274年
- Nanakshahi calendar: 170
- Thai solar calendar: 2180–2181
- Tibetan calendar: མེ་མོ་གླང་ལོ་ (female Fire-Ox); 1764 or 1383 or 611 — to — ས་ཕོ་སྟག་ལོ་ (male Earth-Tiger); 1765 or 1384 or 612

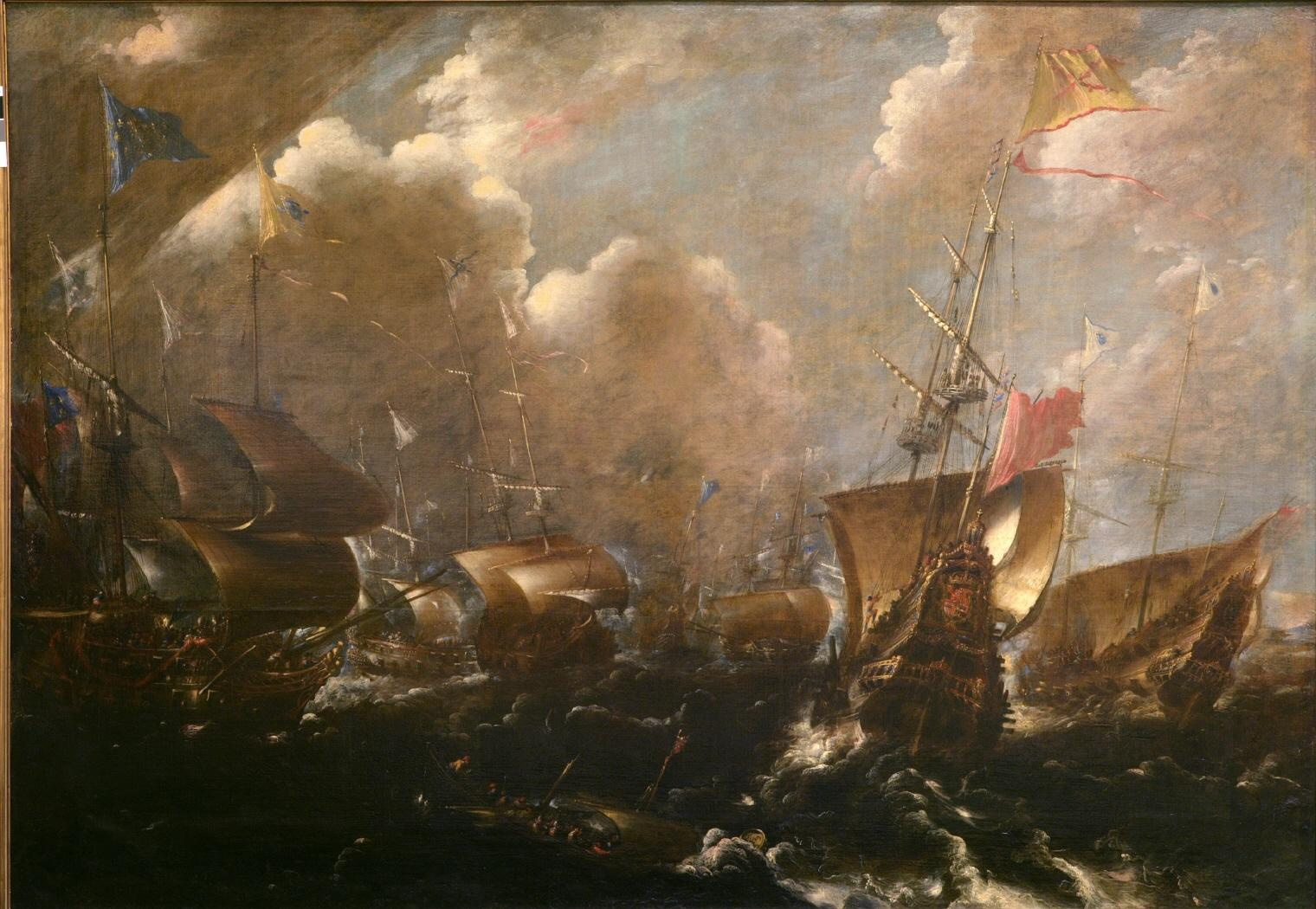
August 22: The French Navy sinks 17 Spanish ships and kills over 2,000 people in the Battle of Getaria.

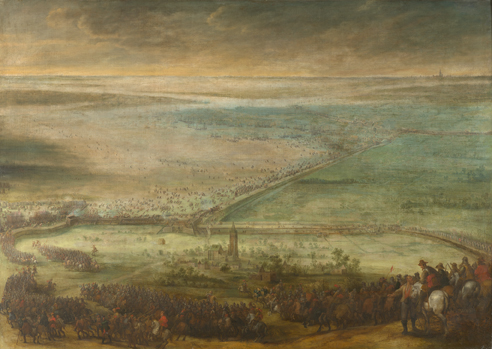
June 20: Battle of Kallo

1638 (MDCXXXVIII) was a common year starting on Friday of the Gregorian calendar and a common year starting on Monday of the Julian calendar, the 1638th year of the Common Era (CE) and Anno Domini (AD) designations, the 638th year of the 2nd millennium, the 38th year of the 17th century, and the 9th year of the 1630s decade. As of the start of 1638, the Gregorian calendar was 10 days ahead of the Julian calendar, which remained in localized use until 1923.

== Events ==
=== January–March ===
- January 4
  - A naval battle takes place in the Indian Ocean, off the coast of Goa in South India, as a Netherlands fleet commanded by Admiral Adam Westerwolt decimates the Portuguese fleet.
  - A fleet of 80 Spanish ships led by Governor-General Sebastián Hurtado de Corcuera attacks the Sultanate of Sulu in the Philippines by beginning an invasion of Jolo island, but Sultan Muwallil Wasit I puts up a stiff resistance.
- January 8 – Shimabara Rebellion: The siege of Shimabara Castle ends after 27 days in Japan's Tokugawa shogunate (part of modern-day Nagasaki prefecture) as the rebel peasants flee reinforcements sent by the shogun Tokugawa Iemitsu.
- January 22 – The Shimabara and Amakusa rebels, having joined up after fleeing the shogun's troops, begin the defense of Hara Castle in modern-day Minamishimabara in the Nagasaki prefecture. The siege lasts more than 11 weeks before the peasants are massacred.
- February 28 – The Scottish National Covenant is signed in Edinburgh, Scotland, in opposition to changes to the Church of Scotland proposed by King Charles I.
- March 3 – Thirty Years' War: Battle of Rheinfelden – A mercenary army under Bernard of Saxe-Weimar, fighting for France, defeats forces of the Holy Roman Empire.
- March 5 – Thirty Years' War: The Treaty of Hamburg is signed by France and Sweden, providing the latter with funds.
- March 22
  - Mughal Emperor Shah Jahan and his sons capture the city of Kandahar from the Safavids.
  - Anne Hutchinson is banished from the Massachusetts Bay Colony for heresy and goes to Rhode Island.
- March 28 – Dutch merchant Willem Kieft is appointed Director of New Netherland by the Dutch East India Company to succeed Wouter van Twiller.
- March 29 – Settlers from Sweden arrive on the ships Kalmar Nyckel and Fogel Grip to establish the settlement of New Sweden in Delaware, beginning the Swedish colonization of the Americas.

=== April–June ===
- April 3 – Preacher John Wheelwright is banished from Boston and founds Exeter, New Hampshire.
- April 14 – The Netherlands colonizes Mauritius, with colonists from the ship Dragon going ashore after sighting it the day before, an event chronicled by British traveler Peter Mundy.
- April 15 – Shogunate forces defeat the last remnants of the Shimabara Rebellion, in the fortress of Hara. In the aftermath, suppression of Christianity is strictly enforced, Portuguese traders are expelled and Japan enters more than two centuries of isolationism.
- April 25 – Settlement of what will become New Haven, Connecticut begins.
- May 13 – Construction begins on the Red Fort in Delhi (India) for Mughal Emperor Shah Jahan who is transferring his capital there from Agra.
- May 23 – The Kandyan Treaty is signed between Singhala King Rajasimha II and the Dutch, to rid Ceylon of the Portuguese.
- June 20 – Eighty Years' War: Battle of Kallo – Spanish troops under Ferdinand of Austria defeat a much larger Dutch force, near Antwerp.
- June 27 – Patriarch Cyril of Constantinople is deposed for high treason, strangled and thrown into the sea by Janissaries, on Ottoman Sultan Murad IV's command.

=== July–September ===
- July 16 – Thirty Years' War: The siege of Saint-Omer ends after almost two months as the French-held Flemish city falls after being besieged by Spanish and German troops.
- July 20 – Scottish Covenanters meet at Muchalls Castle to compose a response to the 14 demands of the Bishops of Aberdeen.
- July 28 – Thirty Years' War: Swedish Army Field Marshal Johan Banér begins a destructive campaign against the Duchy of Pomerania, held by the Holy Roman Empire.
- August 15 – The Portuguese expedition led by Pedro Teixeira completes the first ascent of the Amazon River, crossing the Quijos River and arriving at Quito in Ecuador soon after (the same trip had been made in the opposite direction, in 1541).
- August 22 – Franco-Spanish War (1635–1659): The Battle of Getaria is fought between the navies of France and Spain, with the French sinking all 17 Spanish Navy ships and killing 2,000 Spanish sailors and officers.
- August 27 – Tayyar Mehmed Pasha becomes the new Grand Vizier of the Ottoman Empire after Bayram Pasha dies while fighting in Baghdad.
- September 6 – The Finnish mail service, predecessor of Posti Group, is established.
- September 21 – The Treaty of Hartford is signed, ending the Pequot War between British American colonists and the Pequot.
- September – John Spofford arrives in Boston Harbor, on the ship John of London, and is one of the first people to establish Rowely, Essex County, Massachusetts.

=== October–December ===
- October 21 – The Great Thunderstorm in Widecombe-in-the-Moor, England: probable ball lightning strikes the parish church, killing 4 and injuring about 60.
- November 21 – The General Assembly of the Church of Scotland is summoned to Glasgow, by King Charles I.
- November 24 – New Haven, the first planned city in America, is founded when local Indians make a deed of Quinnipiac to Theophilus Eaton and other English settlers.
- December 18 – Cardinal Mazarin becomes the first adviser to French potentate Richelieu, on the death of Leclerc du Tremblay.
- December 21 – The full moon is in total eclipse from 1:12 to 2:47 UT, and the solstice occurs later in the day, at 16:05 UT.
- December 25 – Capture of Baghdad by the Ottomans under Sultan Murad IV.

=== Date unknown ===
- Shipwrecked English buccaneer Peter Wallace, called Balis by the Spanish, settles near and perhaps gives his name to the Belize River, the first known European settlement in Belize.
- The Peking Gazette makes an official switch in its production process of newspapers, from woodblock printing to movable type printing (private newspapers in Ming dynasty China were first mentioned in 1582).

== Births ==
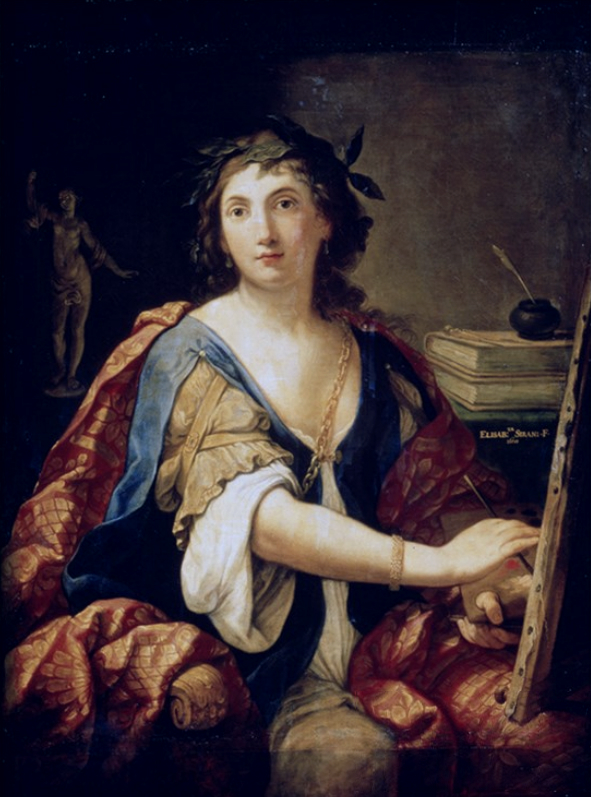
Elisabetta Sirani

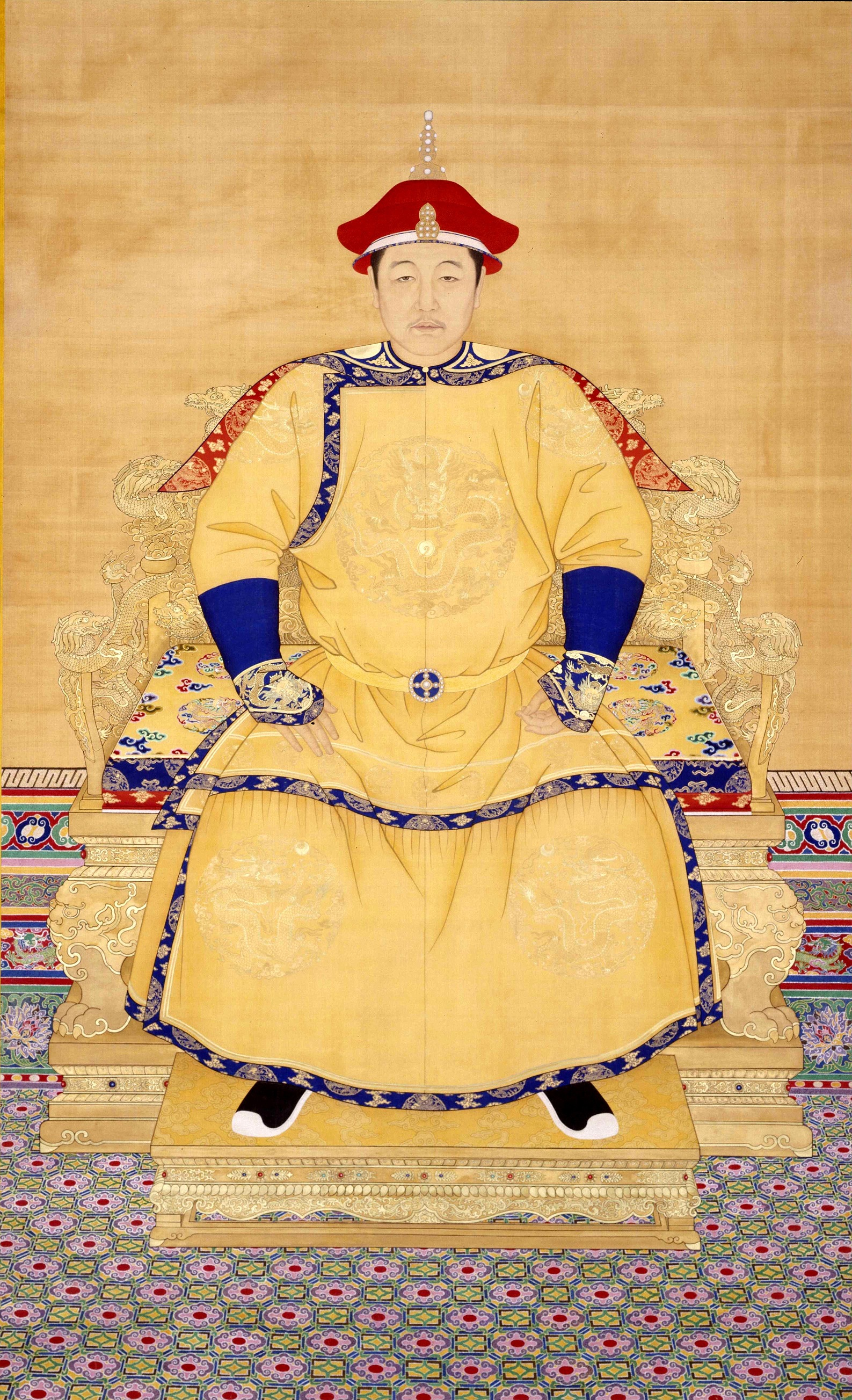
Shunzhi Emperor

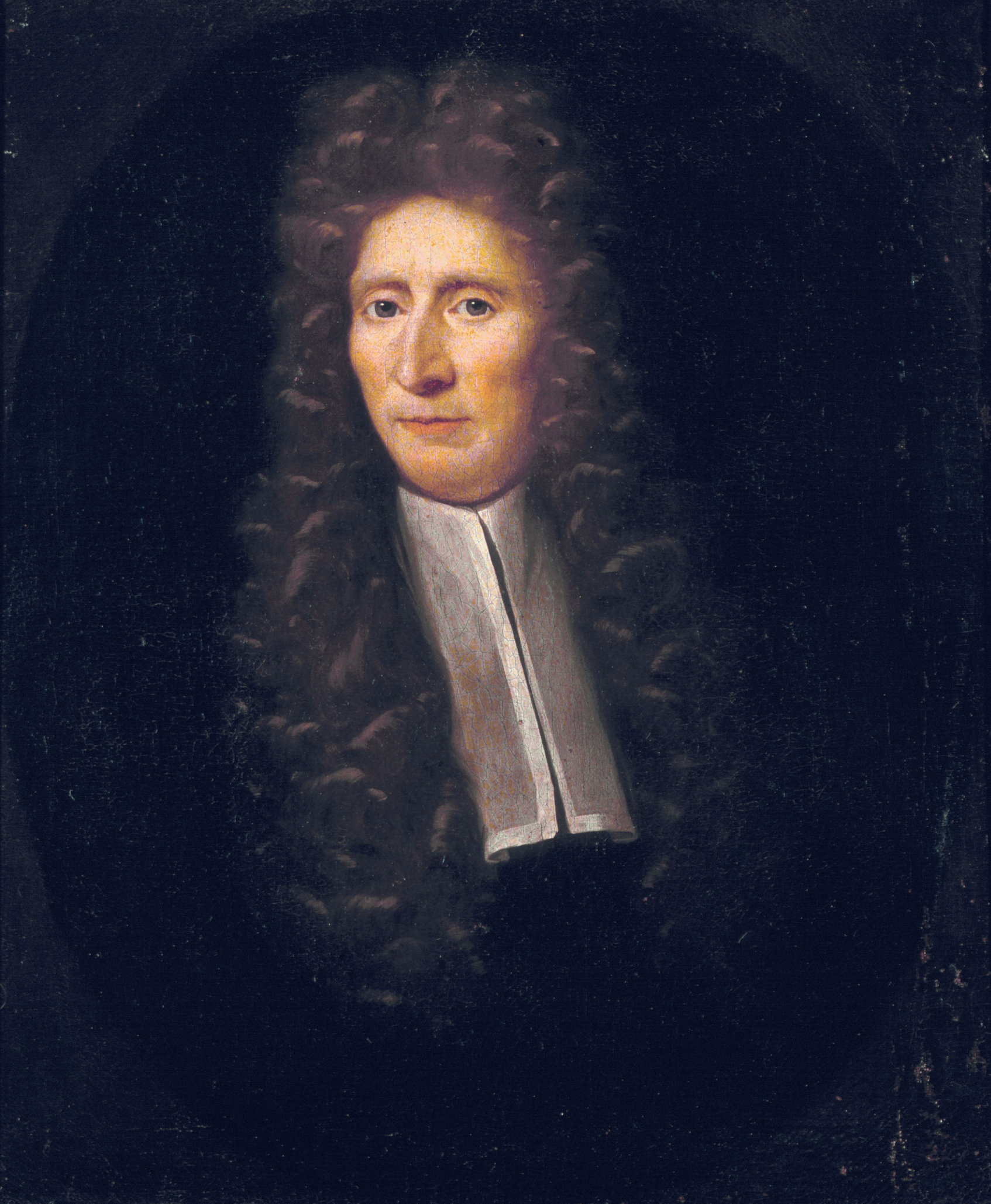
Frederik Ruysch

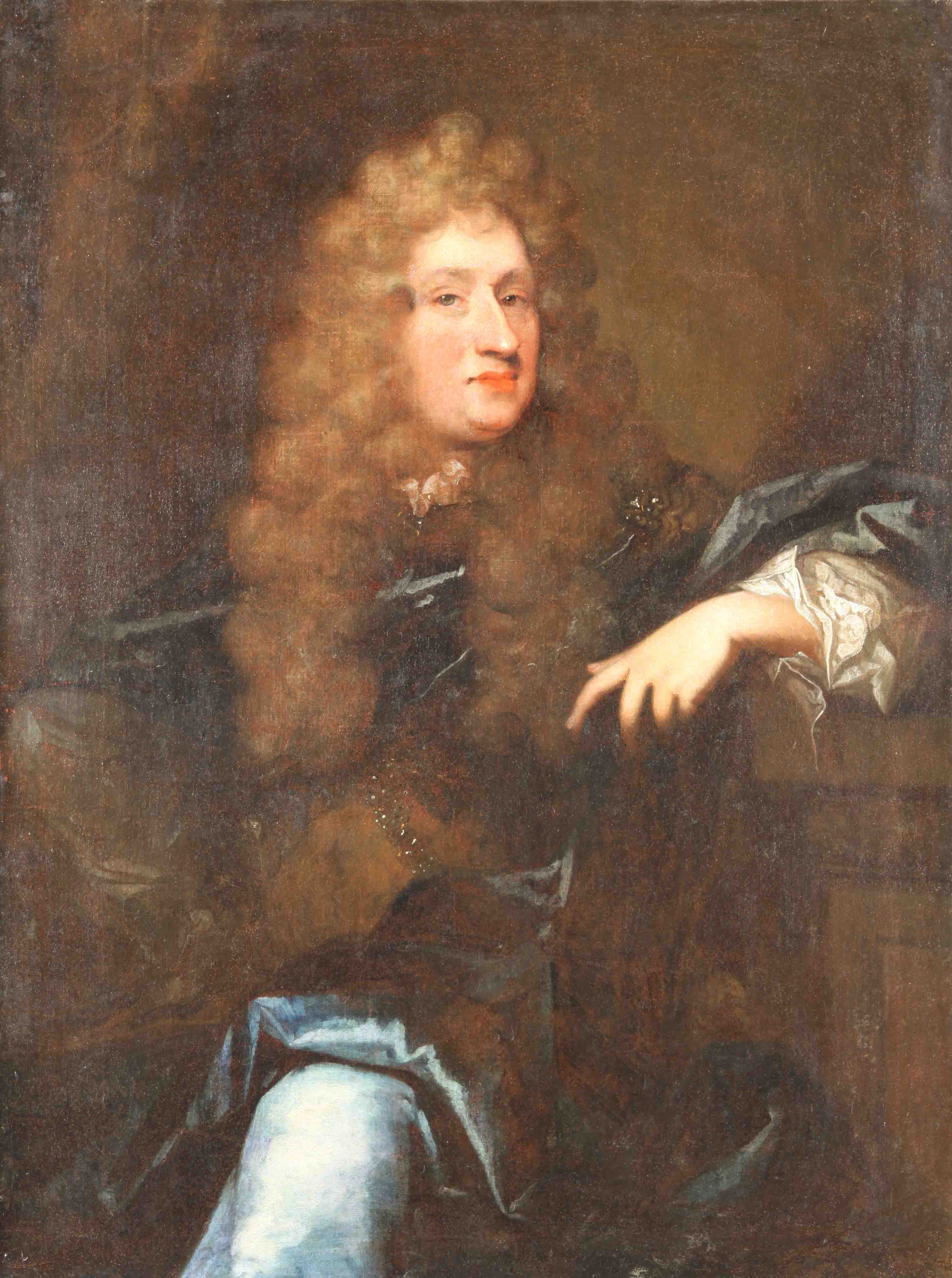
Ulrik Frederik Gyldenløve

Louis XIV

=== January–March ===
- January 1
  - Antoinette du Ligier de la Garde Deshoulières, French writer (d. 1694)
  - Emperor Go-Sai of Japan (d. 1685)
  - Nicolas Steno, Danish pioneer in anatomy and geology, bishop (d. 1686)
- January 7
  - Filippo Bonanni, Italian Jesuit scholar (d. 1723)
  - Marie Elisabeth of Brunswick-Wolfenbüttel, German noblewoman (d. 1687)
- January 8 – Elisabetta Sirani, Italian painter (d. 1665)
- January 12 – Ernst Rüdiger von Starhemberg, Austrian field marshal (d. 1701)
- January 20 – Sir William Glynne, 1st Baronet, English politician (d. 1690)
- January 21
  - David Elias Heidenreich, German poet, dramatist, librettist and translator (d. 1688)
  - Beata Rosenhane, Swedish writer (d. 1674)
- February 13 – Frederick, Duke of Mecklenburg-Grabow, German nobleman, titular Duke of Mecklenburg (d. 1688)
- February 18 – Ikeda Tsunamasa, Japanese daimyō, ruler of the Okayama Domain (d. 1714)
- February 25 – Jørgen Iversen Dyppel, Governor of the Danish West Indies (d. 1683)
- February 28 – John Carmichael, 1st Earl of Hyndford, Scottish nobleman (d. 1710)
- March 6
  - Henry Capell, 1st Baron Capell of Tewkesbury, First Lord’s of the British Admiralty (d. 1696)
  - Statz Friedrich von Fullen, German-born nobleman, Geheimrat of war for Poland (d. 1703)
- March 10 – John Vesey, Irish archbishop (d. 1716)
- March 14 – Johann Georg Gichtel, German mystic and religious leader, critic of Lutheranism (d. 1710)
- March 15 – Shunzhi Emperor of China (d. 1661)
- March 16 – François Crépieul, Jesuit missionary in Canada (d. 1702)
- March 28 – Frederik Ruysch, Dutch physician and anatomist (d. 1731)

=== April–June ===
- April 2
  - Sir Henry Beaumont, 2nd Baronet, English politician (d. 1689)
  - John Covel, English clergyman and scientist, Master of Christ's College (d. 1722)
- May 9 – Gregorio Vasquez de Arce y Ceballos, Colombian painter (d. 1711)
- May 11 – Guy-Crescent Fagon, French physician and botanist (d. 1718)
- May 12 – Pedro Atanasio Bocanegra, Spanish artist (d. 1688)
- May 13 – Richard Simon, French Biblical critic (d. 1712)
- May 29 – John Manners, 1st Duke of Rutland, English nobleman and politician (d. 1711)
- June 2 – Henry Hyde, 2nd Earl of Clarendon, English nobleman (d. 1709)
- June 3 – Thomas Smith, English scholar (d. 1710)
- June 8 – Pierre Magnol, French botanist (d. 1715)
- June 21 – Sir William Roberts, 1st Baronet, English politician (d. 1688)
- June 23 – Princess Christine Elisabeth of Schleswig-Holstein-Sonderburg, German noblewoman (d. 1679)
- June 27 – Samuel Frisching, Bernese soldier and politician (d. 1721)
- June 28 – Louise Marie de La Grange d'Arquien, French noblewoman (d. 1728)
- June 29 – Heinrich Meibom, German physicist and scholar (d. 1700)

=== July–September ===
- July 10 – David Teniers III, Flemish painter (d. 1685)
- July 11 – Olympia Mancini, French courtier (d. 1708)
- July 15 – Giovanni Buonaventura Viviani, Italian composer (d. 1693)
- July 20 – Ulrik Frederik Gyldenløve, leading Norwegian general during the Scanian War (d. 1704)
- July 25 – Cristobal of Saint Catherine, Spanish Catholic priest (d. 1690)
- August 3 – William Louis, Prince of Anhalt-Köthen (1650–1665) (d. 1665)
- August 6 – Nicolas Malebranche, French philosopher (d. 1715)
- August 7 – John Tufton, 4th Earl of Thanet, English politician (d. 1680)
- August 13 – Durgadas Rathore, Indian ruler (d. 1718)
- August 15 – Pieter de Graeff, Dutch politician and noble (d. 1707)
- August 22 – Georg Christoph Eimmart, German engraver (d. 1705)
- September 5 – Louis XIV, King of France from 1643 until his death (d. 1715)
- September 10 – Maria Theresa of Spain, queen consort of Louis XIV of France (d. 1683)
- September 19 – Isaac Milles, English minister (d. 1720)
- September 20 – Antonio Gherardi, Italian painter (d. 1702)
- September 21 – Philippe de Courcillon, French officer and author (d. 1720)
- September 30 – Maximilian Philipp Hieronymus, Duke of Bavaria-Leuchtenberg, German nobleman (d. 1705)

=== October–December ===
- October 7 – Miguel Jerónimo de Molina, Spanish prelate, Bishop of Malta, then of Lleida in Catalonia (d. 1698)
- October 14 – Bernhard II, Duke of Saxe-Jena, German noble (d. 1678)
- October 17 – John Charles, Count Palatine of Gelnhausen (1654–1704) (d. 1704)
- October 21 – Lucia Wijbrants, Dutch artist (d. 1719)
- October 31 – Meindert Hobbema, Dutch painter (d. 1709)
- November 4 – Nuno Álvares Pereira de Melo, 1st Duke of Cadaval, Portuguese nobleman and statesman (d. 1725)
- November 8 – Anton van Dale, Dutch minister (d. 1708)
- November 22 – Christoph Cellarius, German classical scholar (d. 1707)
- November 25 – Catherine of Braganza, Portuguese princess, queen consort of Charles II of England (d. 1705)
- November 30 – Joachim Feller, German professor at the University of Leipzig (d. 1691)
- December 17 – Anna Sophia II, Abbess of Quedlinburg (d. 1683)
- December 24 – Tomás de la Cerda, 3rd Marquis of la Laguna, Spanish nobleman (d. 1692)
- December 25 – Michel Bégon, French ancien regime official (d. 1710)

=== Date unknown ===
- Hannah Allen, British writer (d. 1668)

== Deaths ==
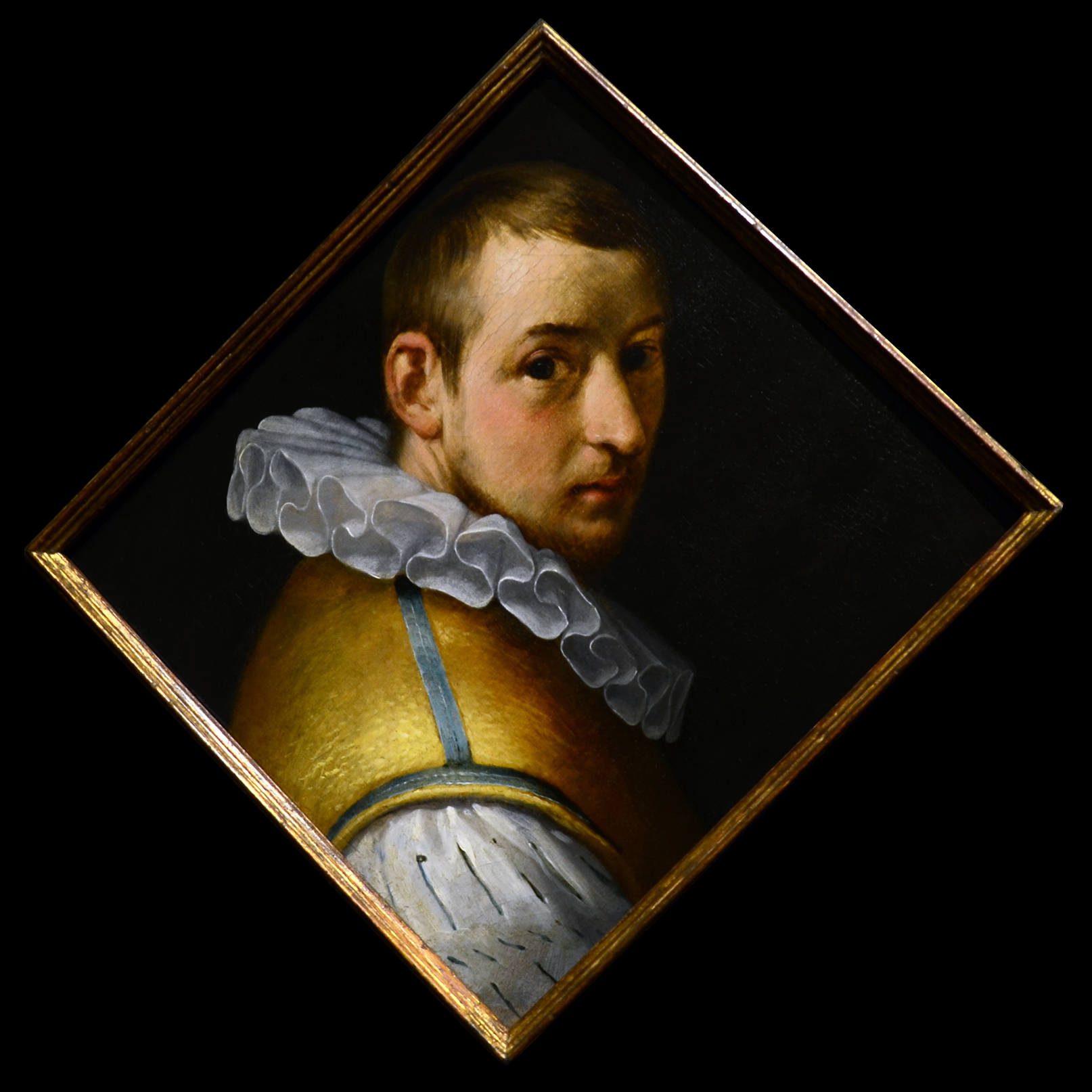
Cornelis van Haarlem

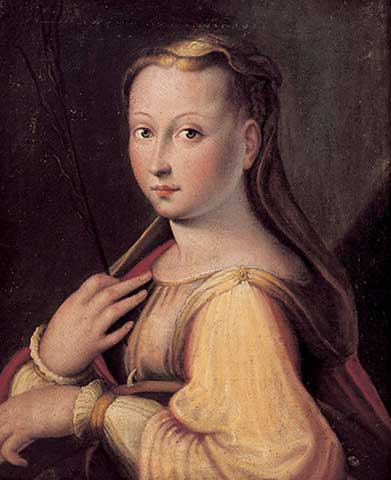
Barbara Longhi

- January 21 – Ignazio Donati, Italian composer (b. c. 1570)
- January 27 – Gonzalo de Céspedes y Meneses, Spanish novelist (b. c. 1585)
- February 26 – Claude Gaspard Bachet de Méziriac, French mathematician (b. 1581)
- March 2 – William Spring of Pakenham, English Member of Parliament (b. 1588)
- March 22 – Johann, Prince of Hohenzollern-Sigmaringen (b. 1578)
- April 1 – Henry Ley, 2nd Earl of Marlborough, English politician (b. 1595)
- April 7 – Shimazu Tadatsune, Japanese ruler of Satsuma (b. 1576)
- April 13 – Henri, Duke of Rohan, French Huguenot leader (b. 1579)
- April 19 – Jeremias Drexel, Jesuit writer and professor of rhetoric (b. 1581)
- April 26 – Margareta Brahe, Swedish political activist (b. 1564)
- May 6
  - Cornelius Jansen, French bishop and religious reformer (b. 1585)
  - Gaj Singh of Marwar, Raja of Marwar Kingdom (b. 1595)
- May 9 – Frederick I, Landgrave of Hesse-Homburg (b. 1585)
- May 27 – Pietro Paolo Floriani, Italian architect (b. 1585)
- June 25 – Juan Pérez de Montalbán, Spanish writer (b. 1602)
- July 27 – John VIII, Count of Nassau-Siegen (b. 1583)
- July 31 – Sibylla Schwarz, German poet (b. 1621)
- August 3 – Philipp Moritz, Count of Hanau-Münzenberg, German noble (b. 1605)
- August 10 – Anton Henry, Count of Schwarzburg-Sondershausen (1586–1638) (b. 1571)
- August 12 – Baltasar Marradas, Spanish count (b. 1560)
- August 13 – Carolus Mulerius, Dutch Hispanist (b. 1601)
- August 27 – John Hoskins, English poet (b. 1566)
- September – Christoph Besold, German jurist (b. 1577)
- September 5 – Dorothea of Hanau-Münzenberg, German noblewoman (b. 1556)
- September 14 – John Harvard, American clergyman (b. 1607)
- September 24 – Georg Friedrich, Margrave of Baden-Durlach (1604–1622) (b. 1573)
- October 6 – Jacob Dircksz de Graeff, Dutch mayor (b. 1579)
- October 4 – Francis Hyacinth, Duke of Savoy (b. 1632)
- October 8 – Raja Wodeyar II, King of Mysore (b. 1612)
- October 14 – Gabriello Chiabrera, Italian poet (b. 1552)
- October 23 – John Ernest, Duke of Saxe-Eisenach, German duke (b. 1566)
- October 28 – Robert Petre, 3rd Baron Petre, English baron (b. 1599)
- November 9 – Johann Heinrich Alsted, German theologian (b. 1588)
- November 11 – Cornelis Corneliszoon van Haarlem, Dutch painter (b. 1562)
- November 16 – Edward Cecil, 1st Viscount Wimbledon, English noble (b. 1572)
- November 19 – Lelio Biscia, Italian Catholic cardinal (b. 1575)
- November 27
  - Redemptus of the Cross, Portuguese Carmelite lay brother and martyr (b. 1598)
  - Denis of the Nativity, French sailor and cartographer (b. 1600)
- December 8 – Ivan Gundulić, Croatian poet (b. 1589)
- December 13 – Catherine of Sweden, Countess Palatine of Kleeburg (b. 1584)
- December 17 – François Leclerc du Tremblay, French Greyfriar (b. 1577)
- December 23 – Barbara Longhi, Italian painter (b. 1552)
