= Johannes-Ostern =

2002 sacred oratorio by Sofia Gubaidulina

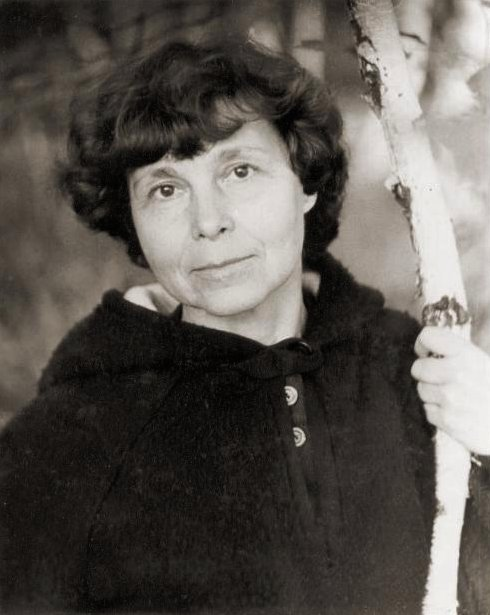
- Gubaidulina in 1981
- Related: Johannes-Passion
- Text: from Gospel of John, Book of Revelation
- Language: Russian
- Performed: 16 March 2002
- Duration: 50 minutes
- Vocal: soprano; tenor; baritone; bass; SATB double choir
- Instrumental: organ; orchestra

Johannes-Ostern (St John Easter) is a sacred oratorio by Sofia Gubaidulina, composed in 2001, continuing her Johannes-Passion (St John Passion) written to commemorate Johann Sebastian Bach in 2000. Gubaidulina compiled her text in Russian for both works mostly from the Gospel of John and the Book of Revelation, and scored them for four soloists, double choir, organ and orchestra. Both works were first performed together at the Michaeliskirche in Hamburg on 16 March 2002 by singers and the orchestra from the Mariinsky Theatre combined with the NDR Chor and NDR Symphony Orchestra, conducted by Valery Gergiev. The full title of both pieces is in German Passion und Auferstehung Jesu Christi nach Johannes and in English Passion and Resurrection of Jesus Christ according to St John. The UK premiere was given as part of the 2002 BBC Proms. They were published by Sikorski.

== Background ==
Gubaidulina worked in Soviet Moscow as one of composing dissidents, along with Alfred Schnittke and Edison Denisov. In the 1970s, Jürgen Köchel, director of the music publisher Sikorski, discovered her and began to bring her music, played by musicians such as Gidon Kremer and Mstislav Rostropovich, to Western Europe. The publisher bought publishing rights for her music.

When the Sacher Foundation decided to buy her manuscripts, she moved to Hamburg. She was awarded the Praemium Imperiale in Tokyo 1998 and Léonie Sonning Music Prize in Copenhagen in 1999. To commemorate Bach in 2000, Gubaidulina, along with Tan Dun, Osvaldo Golijov, and Wolfgang Rihm, was commissioned by the Internationale Bachakademie Stuttgart to write a piece for the Passion 2000 project. Her contribution was the Johannes-Passion ("Passion according to John"), of which she would write: "I was well aware of the difficulties of writing a 'Passion' in Russian. The tradition of the Russian Orthodox Church does not allow the use of instruments ... only your voice and a candle in your hand."

== Composition ==
The following year, Gubaidulina composed Johannes-Ostern as a sequel, commissioned by NDR. She compiled the text for her work again mostly from the Gospel of John and also from the Book of Revelation (known as the Apocalypse of John), an unusual combination that contributes to the uniqueness of her setting. She scored it for four vocal soloists (soprano, tenor, baritone, bass), mixed SATB double chorus, organ and a large orchestra. The music was published by Sikorski. The duration is given as around 50 minutes.

Johannes-Passion and Johannes-Ostern form a "diptych" on the death and resurrection of Christ, her largest work. She referred to it as her opus summum.

== Performances ==
The first performance of both works, Johannes-Passion and Johannes-Ostern, was on 16 March 2002 at the Michaeliskirche in Hamburg. Entitled Passion und Auferstehung Jesu Christi nach Johannes, it was performed by three Russian soloists, the NDR Chor and NDR Symphony Orchestra, the Kirov Choir and Orchestra and the Saint Petersburg Chamber Choir, conducted by Valery Gergiev. It was the final concert of the NDR's concert series "das neue werk".

The UK premiere was given as part of the BBC Proms at the Royal Albert Hall on 25 August 2002, performed by bass Gennady Bezzubenkov, soprano Natalia Korneva, tenor Viktor Lutsiuk, baritone Fyodor Mozhaev, the Kirov Orchestra and Choir, and the Saint Petersburg Chamber Choir, conducted by Gergiev. In 2007, the complete work was performed on two consecutive days at the Frauenkirche in Dresden in a memorial concert for the bombing of Dresden. The first performance in German, it was given by bassist Nicholas Isherwood with Corby Welch and Bernd Valentin, the Gächinger Kantorei and the chamber choir of the Musikhochschule Trossingen, the Stuttgart Radio Symphony Orchestra conducted by Helmuth Rilling.

== Text and music ==
The text of Johannes-Ostern is structured in scenes that follow Biblical narrations:

1. Ostermorgen (Easter Morning)
2. Maria Magdalena
3. Erste Erscheinung des auferstandenen Christus vor den Jüngern (First Appearance Of The Risen Christ To His Disciples)
4. "Ich glaube nicht" ("I Do Not Believe")
5. Der Reiter auf dem weißen Pferd (The Rider On The White Horse)
6. Zweite Erscheinung Christi vor den Jüngern (Second Appearance Of Christ To His Disciples)
7. Intermedium
8. "Ich bin das lebendige Brot" ("I Am The Living Bread")
9. "Die Finsternis vergeht" ("The Darkness Is Passing Away")
10. Dritte Erscheinung Christi vor den Jüngern (Third Appearance Of Christ To His Disciples)
11. Das Gericht (Judgement)
12. "Und ich sah einen neuen Himmel und eine neue Erde" ("And I Saw A New Heaven And A New Earth")

They deal with the Resurrection of Jesus and the Empty tomb, appearances of women and disciples, quoting Jesus after the Gospel of John. The work ends with visions regarding the Last Judgement and a New Earth, taken from the Book of Revelation. The oratorio takes around an hour to perform.

A solo bass voice renders all texts from the Bible, including the narration and the direct speech of not only Jesus but also of his disciples and other figures. The music is tonal and partly based on antiphonal liturgical singing.

Christophe Thomas, who reviewed the UK premiere, noted that the Easter piece is lighter in sound and celebratory, also based on Russian liturgical tradition, beginning with an Easter Hymn and ending with praise.

== Instrumental piece ==
Gubaidulina derived an instrumental piece, The Rider On The White Horse, for organ and large orchestra from the oratorio, basically omitting the voices from the movement following the scene of Jesus and the doubting Thomas.
