= Johannes-Passion (Gubaidulina) =

Oratorio by Sofia Gubaidulina

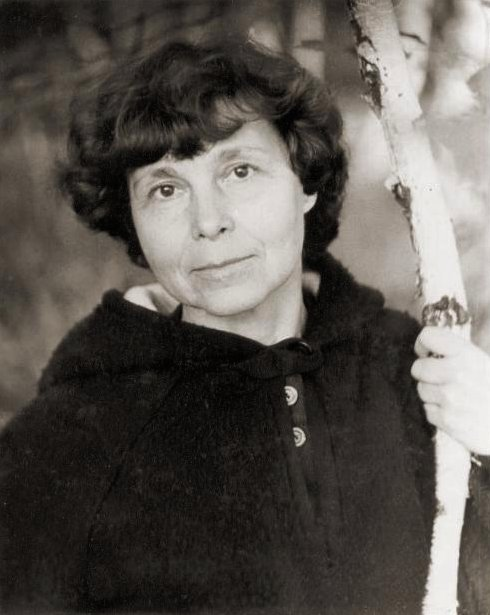
- Gubaidulina in 1981
- Occasion: 2000 Bach commemoration
- Text: from Gospel of John, Book of Revelation
- Language: Russian
- Performed: 9 July 2000
- Duration: 90 min
- Vocal: soprano; tenor; baritone; bass; SATB double choir
- Instrumental: organ; orchestra

The Johannes-Passion (St John Passion) is a sacred oratorio by Sofia Gubaidulina, composed in 2000 on a commission to commemorate Johann Sebastian Bach who had composed his Johannes-Passion, a setting of the Passion as narrated the Gospel of John first performed in Leipzig on Good Friday 1724. Gubaidulina compiled her text from both the Gospel of John and the Book of Revelation and scored the work for four soloists, double choir, organ and orchestra.

== Background ==
Bach's Johannes-Passion, a large choral composition in two parts on German text, written to be performed in a Lutheran service on Good Friday, is based on the Passion, as told in two chapters from the Gospel of John (John 18 and John 19). During the vespers service, the two parts of the work were performed before and after the sermon. Bach led the first performance on 7 April 1724 in Leipzig's Nikolaikirche.

== History ==
To commemorate Bach in 2000, Gubaidulina, along with Tan Dun, Osvaldo Golijov, and Wolfgang Rihm, was commissioned by the Internationale Bachakademie Stuttgart to write a piece for the Passion 2000 project. Her contribution was the Johannes-Passion ("Passion according to John"). Gubaidulina compiled the text for her work from both the Gospel of John as the Book of Revelation; the Johannes-Passion is the first musical work to connect the two texts. Her work is also the first Passion in Russian. She scored it for four vocal soloists (soprano, tenor, baritone, bass), mixed SATB double chorus, organ and a large orchestra. It was first performed in Stuttgart on 9 July 2000 by the choir and orchestra of the Mariinsky Theatre conducted by Valery Gergiev. It was published by Sikorski.

The work was recorded by the performers of the world premiere, released in 2001, with Natalia Kornewa, Viktor Lutsiuk, Fedor Muzhaev and Genady Bezzubenkov, the Saint Petersburg Chamber Choir and choir and orchestra of the Mariinsky Theatre. The duration is given as around 90 minutes.

In 2002, Gubaidulina composed a sequel, Johannes-Ostern ("Easter according to John"), commissioned by NDR. The two works together form a "diptych" on the death and resurrection of Christ, her largest work. She referred to it her opus summum.

== Music ==
The music of Johannes-Passion is structured in eleven sections. It is inspired by Russian-orthodox church music, with recitation of a soloist and choruses, which accounts for around 2/3 of the composition. Her approach is not the creation of a dramatic action, but rather a calm objective rendering. The choice of interspersed visionary texts from the Book of Revelation adds to a music distanced from human feelings.

She used a sparse recitation with few small intervals, but an opulent orchestra and choir. The recitation is full of tension in spite of simple means. The music features oboe cantilenas, tonal chords and tone clusters, glissandos and percussion.
