= Cristobal of Saint Catherine =

17th-century Spanish Catholic hermit and priest

Blessed Cristóbal of Saint Catherine TOSF
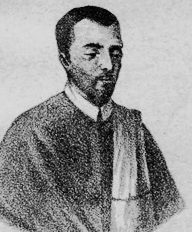
- Born: Cristóbal López de Valladolid Orea; 25 July 1638; Mérida, Badajoz, Habsburg Spain
- Died: 21 July 1690 (aged 51); Córdoba, Habsburg Spain
- Venerated in: Roman Catholic Church
- Beatified: 7 April 2013, Córdoba Cathedral, Spain by Cardinal Angelo Amato
- Feast: 21 July

Cristóbal of Saint Catherine (25 July 1638 – 21 July 1690) – born Cristóbal López de Valladolid Orea – was a Roman Catholic Spanish priest and a professed member of the Third Order of Saint Francis. He was the founder of the Franciscan Hospitallers of Jesus of Nazareth which paid careful attention to both religious and social needs of the faithful.

He was beatified on 7 April 2013 in a celebration that Cardinal Angelo Amato presided over on the behalf of Pope Francis.

== Life ==
Cristóbal López de Valladolid Orea was born in 1638 as the son of poor laborers (he had five brothers) and was baptized in the church of Santa Eulalia. In either 1645 or 1646 he fled from his home in an effort to join the Order of Friars Minor but he soon returned home after his worried mother sent his brothers to bring him home. He served as an altar server and worked as a nurse in a hospital that the Order of Saint John of God managed.

He was ordained to the priesthood on 20 March 1663 in Badajoz and after was made a chaplain to armed services fighting in Portugal though he had to return home after falling ill. In 1667 he retired to a hermitage in the mountains of El Bañuelo but his desire to follow the Rule and the teachings of Francis of Assisi prompted him to pursue the Franciscan charism in a concrete manner. It was for this reason he became a professed member of the Third Order of Saint Francis in 1671 and he assumed the religious name of "Cristóbal of Saint Catherine". He established the Franciscan Hospitallers of Jesus of Nazareth in Córdoba on 11 February 1673 which pushed the boundaries of a range of both religious and social issues.

He died in 1690 clutching a crucifix due to a cholera epidemic in which he tended to the victims; it was said not long after his death several miracles were attributed to his direct intercession. His order received papal approval from Pope Benedict XIV in 1746.

== Beatification ==
The cause of beatification commenced on 27 June 1770 under Pope Clement XIV and the late priest was declared a Servant of God while an informative process had been held before this from 12 March 1760 until 4 April 1766; this was later subject to validation from the Congregation for the Causes of Saints in Rome on 27 October 1995. The postulation for the cause sent the Positio dossier to the C.C.S. in 2000 and historians cleared it of having no obstacles to it on 7 November 2000; six theologians assented to the cause on 12 November 2011 as did the cardinal and bishop members of the C.C.S. on 19 June 2012. Pope Benedict XVI declared him to have lived a life of heroic virtue on 28 June 2012 and named him Venerable.

On 20 December 2012 the pope approved a decree that recognized a miracle attributed to his intercession which would allow for him to be beatified. The beatification was held on 7 April 2013 and Cardinal Angelo Amato presided over the celebration on the behalf of Pope Francis.

The current postulator for this cause is Father Evaristo Martínez de Alegría.
