= Hans Sikorski =

German sheet music publisher

Internationale Musikverlage Hans Sikorski is an international music publishing company in Berlin, formerly headquartered in Hamburg, Germany. As of June 2019, Sikorski is a part of Concord.

The music publishing firm of Hans Sikorski was founded in 1935. Sikorski's repertoire consists of entertainment music as well as contemporary serious music, and the firm has always been committed to new music from many countries. Publications include chamber music, orchestral music and stage works to musicals and film music.

== Literature ==
- Fetthauer, Sophie. Musikverlage im "Dritten Reich" und im Exil. Hamburg 2004; 3.4. "Arisierung" durch die Cautio Treuhand und Hans C. Sikorski
