= François Crépieul =

François Crépieul (March 16, 1638 —1702) was a Jesuit missionary in Canada and vicar apostolic for the Montagnais Indians.

== Biography ==
Crépieul was born in Arles, France. As a youth he studied in the Jesuit college of his native town and in that of Douai, becoming a member of the order at Tournai in 1659. He continued his studies at Lille and Douai and taught at Lille and Cambrai.

In 1670 he sailed for Canada. Upon the completion of his theological studies in the College of Quebec, he was assigned in October 1671 to the Tadoussac region, where he worked among the Montagnais and Algonquin tribes for twenty-eight years.

In 1696 or 1697 he was appointed vicar apostolic for the Montagnais and, on the discontinuance of the mission a few years later, moved to Quebec, where he spent the rest of his life.

Claude Dablon, superior of all the missions in Canada, described him as "a veritable apostle".

== Works ==
For the benefit of his fellow missionaries, Crépieul wrote an account of his time as a missionary, included in the sixty-third volume of Reuben Gold Thwaites' The Jesuit Relations. He describes the life as a tedious and prolonged martyrdom, and a school of patience, penance, and resignation.
