= List of compositions by Krzysztof Penderecki =

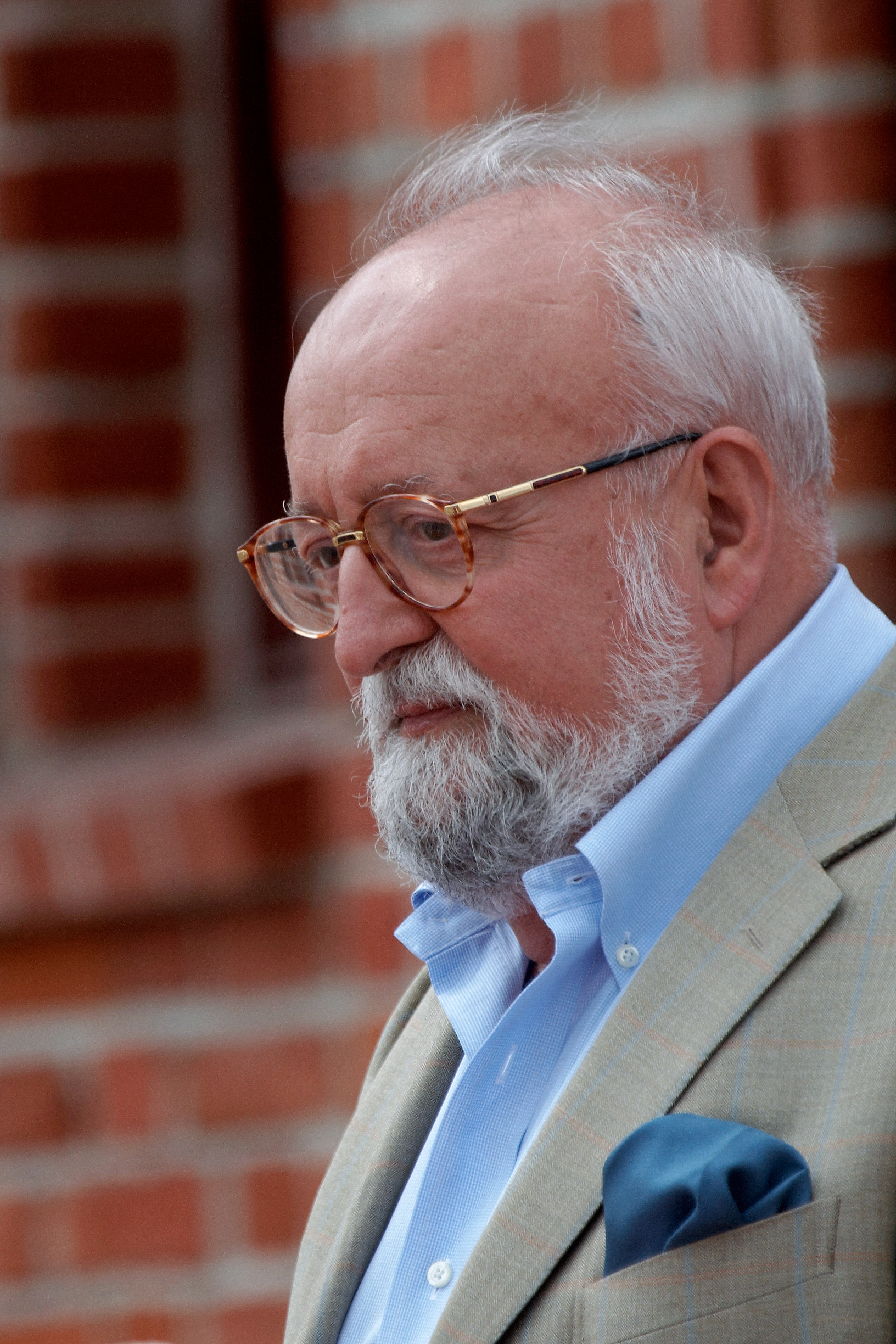
Krzysztof Penderecki, 2008

The following is an incomplete list of works by the Polish composer Krzysztof Penderecki.

== Operas ==
- The Most Valiant Knight, children's opera in 3 acts (1965)
- Die Teufel von Loudun (The Devils of Loudun, 1968–69), based on the nonfiction book of the same name by Aldous Huxley.
- Paradise Lost (1975–78), based on the epic poem by John Milton
- Die schwarze Maske (The Black Mask) (1984–86), based on the play by Gerhart Hauptmann
- Ubu Rex (1990–91), based on the play Ubu Roi by Alfred Jarry
- Phaedra (2020, unfinished)

== Symphonies ==
- Symphony No. 1 (1973)
- Symphony No. 2: Christmas (1980)
- Symphony No. 3 (1988–95)
- Symphony No. 4: Adagio (1989), winner of the 1992 Grawemeyer Award for Music Composition
- Symphony No. 5: Korean (1991–92)
- Symphony No. 6: Chinese Poems (2008–17)
- Symphony No. 7: Seven Gates of Jerusalem (1996), for soloists, speaker, triple chorus and orchestra
- Symphony No. 8: Lieder der Vergänglichkeit (2004–05, rev. 2008), for voices, chorus and orchestra

== Orchestral ==
- Symphonic Scherzo for orchestra (c. 1953–55, withdrawn)
- Overture for orchestra (1956–57, withdrawn)
- Epitaph Artur Malawski in Memoriam for string orchestra and timpani (1958)
- Emanations (Emanacje, 1959) for two string orchestras tuned a semitone apart
- Anaklasis (1959) for strings and percussion
- Threnody to the Victims of Hiroshima (Tren Ofiarom Hiroszimy, 1961) for 52 string instruments
- Polymorphia (1961) for 48 string instruments
- Fluorescences (Fluorescencje, 1961–62) for orchestra
- Canon (1962) for string orchestra
- Three Pieces in Baroque Style (1963, music for The Saragossa Manuscript)
- De Natura Sonoris No. 1 (1966)
- Pittsburgh Overture (1967) for wind band
- Kosmogonia (1970)
- De Natura Sonoris No. 2 (1971)
- Prélude (1971) for winds, percussion and double basses
- Actions (1971) for free jazz orchestra
- Intermezzo (1973) for 24 strings
- The Dream of Jacob ("Als Jakob erwachte...") (1974)
- Adagietto from Paradise Lost (1979)
- Sinfonietta No. 1, for string orchestra (1992, arranged from String Trio)
- Sinfonietta No. 2, for clarinet and strings (1994, arranged from Clarinet Quartet)
- Music from Ubu Rex (1994)
- Entrata (1994), for brass and timpani
- Burlesque Suite from Ubu Rex (1995) for large wind band
- Serenade, for string orchestra (1996–97)
- Luzerner Fanfare (1998), for eight trumpets and percussion
- Fanfarria Real (2003)
- Danziger Fanfare (2008), for brass and percussion
- Prelude for Peace (2009), for brass and percussion
- De Natura Sonoris No. 3 (2012)
- Sinfonietta No. 3, for string orchestra (2012, arranged from String Quartet No. 3)
- Adagio for string orchestra (2013; from Symphony No. 3)
- Polonaise for orchestra (2016)
- Polonaise No. 2 for orchestra (2018)
- Fanfare for the independent Poland for 7 brass instruments, timpani and percussion (2018)

== Concertante ==
- Piano:
  - Piano Concerto: Resurrection (2001–02, revised 2007)
- Violin:
  - Violin Concerto (1962–63; withdrawn)
  - Capriccio for Violin and Orchestra (1967)
  - Violin Concerto No. 1 (1976–77, revised 1987), for Isaac Stern
  - Violin Concerto No. 2: Metamorphosen (1992–95), for Anne-Sophie Mutter
- Viola:
  - Viola Concerto (1983, also versions for: clarinet, cello, and version for chamber orchestra)
- Cello:
  - Sonata for Cello and Orchestra (1964), for Siegfried Palm
  - Cello Concerto No. 1 (1972)
  - Cello Concerto No. 2 (1982)
  - Cello Concerto (transcription from Viola Concerto, 1983)
  - Concerto Grosso No. 1, for three cellos and orchestra (2000–01)
  - Largo for cello and orchestra (2003)
- Flute:
  - Fonogrammi for flute and chamber orchestra (1961)
  - Concerto for flute and chamber orchestra (1992)
  - Sinfonietta for flute and string orchestra (2019)
- Oboe:
  - Capriccio for Oboe and Eleven Strings (1964)
- Clarinet:
  - Concerto for clarinet and chamber orchestra (1995, transcription from Flute Concerto, 1992)
  - Clarinet Concerto (1997, transcription from Viola Concerto, 1983)
  - Concerto Grosso No. 2, for five clarinets and orchestra (2004)
- Horn
  - Horn Concerto (2008)
- Others:
  - Concerto for violino grande and orchestra (1967; withdrawn)
  - Partita, for harpsichord, electric guitar, bass guitar, harp, double bass and orchestra (1971, revised 1991)
  - Music for alto flute, marimba and strings (2000; from Symphony No. 3)
  - Double Concerto for violin, viola and orchestra (2012)
  - Trumpet Concertino (2015)
  - Saxophone Concerto (2015; after Viola Concerto)

== Vocal/choral ==
- Asking for Happy Isles for voice and piano (c. 1954–55)
- The Sky at Night for voice and piano (1955)
- Silence for voice and piano (1955)
- Psalms of David (1958)
- Breath of Night for voice and piano (1958)
- Strophen (1959) for soprano, speaker and ten instruments
- Dimensions of Time and Silence (1959–61)
- African Lyrics for voice and piano (1960)
- Stabat Mater (1962)
- Brygada śmierci (Death Brigade), radio play for reciter and tape (1963)
- Cantata (1964)
- St Luke Passion (1965)
- Dies Irae (1967)
- Kosmogonia (1970)
- Utrenja (Morning Prayer) (1969–71)
- Ecloga VIII (1972)
- Canticum Canticorum Salomonis (1970–73)
- Magnificat (1973–74)
- Te Deum (1979)
- Agnus Dei (1981)
- Polish Requiem (1980–84, revised and expanded 1993, expanded 2005 after Pope John Paul II's death)
- Song of the Cherubim (1986)
- Veni creator (1987)
- Benedicamus Domino (1992)
- Benedictus (1993)
- Agnus Dei (1995, for the Requiem of Reconciliation)
- De Profundis (1996)
- Hymne an den heiligen Daniel (1997)
- Hymne an den heiligen Adalbert (1997)
- Credo (1997–98)
- Benedictus (2002)
- Santus for chorus a capella (2008)
- Gloriosa virginum for chorus a capella (2009)
- Kaddish (2009), for voices, choir, and orchestra
- Ein feste Burg ist unser Gott (2010), for mixed choir, brass, percussion and string orchestra
- Powiało na mnie morze snów... Pieśni zadumy i nostalgii (A sea of dreams did breathe on me... Songs of reverie and nostalgia, 2010)
- Missa brevis for chorus a capella (2013)
- Dies illa (2014), for three soloists, three mixed choirs and orchestra
- Budapest '56 "Requiem" for narrator, soloists, chorus and orchestra (2015–16)
- Domine quid multiplicati sunt for chorus a capella (2015)
- Lacrimosa No. 2 for soprano, chorus and chamber orchestra (2018)

== Chamber ==
- Violin Sonata No. 1 (1953)
- Misterioso for flute and piano (1954 or 1955)
- Three Miniatures for Clarinet and Piano (1956)
- String Quartet (1956–57; withdrawn)
- Three Miniatures for Violin and Piano (1959)
- String Quartet No. 1 (1960)
- String Quartet No. 2 (1968)
- Der unterbrochene Gedanke, for string quartet (1988)
- String Trio (1991)
- Clarinet Quartet (1993)
- Violin Sonata No. 2 (1999)
- Sextet, for clarinet, horn, violin, viola, cello and piano (2000)
- Agnus Dei, for eight cellos (transcription of the choral work; 2007)
- String Quartet No. 3 (2008)
- Serenata, for three cellos (2008)
- Duo concertante, for violin and double bass (2010)
- String Quintet (2015)
- String Quartet No. 4 (2016)

== Solo instrument ==
- Violin
  - Capriccio (2008)
  - Tanz (2009)
  - La Follia (2013)
- Viola
  - Cadenza (1984)
  - Sarabande (2000–01)
  - Tanz (2010)
  - Tempo di valse (2013)
- Cello
  - Capriccio per Siegfried Palm (1968)
  - Per Slava (1986)
  - Suite (initially entitled Divertimento) (1994–2013)
  - Violoncello totale (2011)
- Clarinet
  - Prelude (1987)
- Horn
  - Capriccio per Radovan "Il sogno di un cacciatore" (2012)
- Tuba
  - Capriccio (1980)
- Keyboard
  - Mensura sortis for 2 pianos (1963; withdrawn)
  - De rebus sonoribus for harpsichord (1965; withdrawn)
  - Aria, Ciaccona & Vivace (2019; first composition for solo piano)
