= Robert Cohen (cellist) =

British cellist (born 1959)

- Born: 15 June 1959 (age 67); London, England, UK
- Genre: Classical
- Occupations: Cellist, soloist, conductor, educator
- Instrument: Cello
- Labels: EMI Classics; Deutsche Grammophon; Sony; Bis; CRD; Decca; Naxos; BeArTon
- Website: robertcohen.info

Robert Cohen (born 15 June 1959) is a British concert cellist.

== Early life and education ==
Cohen was born on 15 June 1959 in London to violinist Raymond Cohen and pianist Anthya Rael. Having begun playing the cello at age 5, at age 10 he entered the Purcell School for Young Musicians. He also began studies with William Pleeth. At age 12 he made his concerto debut at the Royal Festival Hall, where he performed the Boccherini Concerto in B flat. His Wigmore Hall recital debut followed at age 17. In 1975 he began studies at the Guildhall School of Music and Drama, he graduated with a postgraduate Diploma of Advanced Solo in 1977. During this period he also studied with Jacqueline du Pré, André Navarra and Mstislav Rostropovich.

== Career ==
In 1976 he made his recording debut with the Elgar Cello Concerto and the London Philharmonic Orchestra, which went on to receive a Silver Disc for recording sales. In 1984 he bought a Stradivarius cello, the Bonjour, which he kept until 1993.

He has been invited to perform concertos by conductors Claudio Abbado, Antal Dorati, Sir Mark Elder, Mariss Jansons, Sir Charles Mackerras, Jerzy Maksymiuk, Kurt Masur, Riccardo Muti, Sir Roger Norrington, Tadaaki Otaka, Sir Simon Rattle, Stanisław Skrowaczewski, Michael Tilson-Thomas and Osmo Vanska. He has notably collaborated in chamber music with Yehudi Menuhin, Amadeus Quartet, Menahem Pressler, Leonidas Kavakos and Krystian Zimerman and with his regular duo partner pianist Heini Karkkainen.

From 2000 to 2012 Cohen was Professor of Advanced Solo Studies at the Conservatorio della Svizzera Italiana, Lugano. In 2010 he became a professor at the Royal Academy of Music. He gives masterclasses internationally and lectures on music preparation and performance techniques.

In 1989 he became artistic director of the Charleston Manor Festival. The final festival took place in the summer of 2012.

Cohen was the cellist of the Fine Arts Quartet from October 2011 until January 2018.

Composer Sally Beamish has dedicated two works to Cohen, the cello concertos 'River' (1997), inspired by the eponymous 1983 anthology by Ted Hughes, and 'Song Gatherer' (2009).

In 2000 he directed a series on Les Six as part of the City of London Festival.

In 2014 he created the ongoing monthly programme ‘On That Note’ with Milwaukee Public Radio (NPR), which discusses the life of a working classical musician.

In 2020 he became an Ambassador of the Tim Henman Foundation.

== Personal life ==
Married in 1987, Cohen lives with his wife in London. They have four sons.

== Awards ==
- Suggia Prize for potential soloists - annually 1967-1971.
- Piatigorsky Prize, Tanglewood 1978.
- Winner of Young Concert Artists, New York 1978.
- Winner of Unesco International Competition, Czechoslovakia 1981.
- Honorary Member of the Royal Academy of Music (HonRAM) in 2009.
- Robert Helpmann Award, Australia 2005 - performing Brett Dean's 12 Angry Cellos.

== Discography ==
Year	Title	Label
1978	Elgar Cello Concerto - London Philharmonic / Del Mar	EMI / Classics for Pleasure
1979	With pianist Roger Vignoles: Grieg Sonata in A Minor Op. 36; Franck Sonata in A	CRD Records
1980	Dvorak complete Piano Trios - Cohen Trio Dvorak Rondo in G minor Op.94	CRD Records
1981	Dvorak Cello Concerto - London Philharmonic / Macal	EMI / Classics for Pleasure
1981	Tchaikovsky Variations on a Rococo Theme - London Philharmonic / Macal	EMI / Classics for Pleasure
1983	Virtuoso Cello Music - with pianist Geoffrey Parsons: Dvorak Rondo in G minor Op.94; Chopin Introduction and Polonaise brillante in C, Op. 3 (arr. R Cohen); Locatelli Sonata in D, Op. 3 No. 6 (ed. Piatti); Popper Hungarian Rhapsody Op. 68; Popper Serenade Op. 54 No. 2; Popper Polonaise de Concert Op. 14	EMI
1985	Beethoven Triple Concerto with Zimmerman and Manz - English Chamber Orchestra / Saraste	EMI / Classics for Pleasure
1986	Schubert String Quintet - Amadeus Quartet	Deutsche Grammophon
1986	Rodrigo Concierto en modo Galante - London Symphony Orchestra / Batiz	EMI
1990	JS Bach complete Solo Suites	Collins Classics
1990	Howard Blake Cello Concerto 'Diversions' - Philharmonia Orchestra / Blake	Sony / Columbia
1992	Elgar Cello Concerto - Royal Philharmonic Orchestra / Mackerras	Decca Records
1993	Bliss Concerto - Royal Philharmonic Orchestra / Wordsworth	Decca Records
1993	Dvorak Piano Quintet Op.81 Dvorak Rondo in G minor Op.94	Verdi Records
1993	Walton Cello Concerto - Bournemouth Symphony Orchestra / Litton	Decca Records
1994	Britten complete Solo Suites	Decca Records
1995	Tchaikovsky Sextet Souvenir de Florence - Endellion Quartet w. Tim Boulton	CRD Records
1995	Morton Feldman Cello and Orchestra - New World Symphony / Tilson-Thomas	Decca Records
1998	Sally Beamish Cello Concerto No.1 - Swedish Chamber Orchestra / Rudner	BIS
2002	HK Gruber Cello Concerto - Swedish Chamber Orchestra / Gruber	BIS
2009	Durufle Requiem - Vasari singers / Backhouse, Sarah Connolly, Christopher Maltman and Jeremy Filsell	Signum Records
2012	Saint-Saens Piano Quartet, Piano Quintet and Barcarolle - Fine Arts Quartet, Ortiz	Naxos
2013	Lutoslawski Cello Concerto - Sinfonia Varsovia / Maksymiuk	BeArton
2014	Mozart Piano Concertos 20, 21 arr. Lachner - Fine Arts Quartet, Goldstein	Naxos
2013	Bernard Herrmann, Souvenir de Voyage - Fine Arts Quartet, Lethiec	Naxos
2015	David Del Tredici, Magyar Madness - Fine Arts Quartet, Lethiec	Naxos
2017	Mozart Piano Concertos 23, 24 arr. Lachner - Fine Arts Quartet, Goldstein	Naxos
