= Kai Bumann =

German conductor (1961–2022)

- Kai Bumann, c. 2015
- Born: 16 August 1961; West Berlin, Germany
- Died: 2 June 2022 (aged 60); Nowy Targ, Poland
- Occupations: Conductor; Academic teacher
- Organizations: Opera Krakowska; Swiss Youth Symphony Orchestra; Warsaw Chamber Opera; Polish Baltic Philharmonic
- Awards: Geneva International Music Competition

Kai Bumann (16 August 1961 – 2 June 2022) was a German conductor who led orchestras and opera companies mainly in Poland, such as the Opera Krakowska, Warsaw Chamber Opera and the Polish Baltic Philharmonic. He was conductor and artistic director of the Swiss Youth Symphony Orchestra (SJSO) from 1998 until his death.

== Career ==
Born in 1961 in West Berlin, Bumann studied at the Berlin University of the Arts and first worked as répétiteur, from 1986 at Theater Trier and from 1988 at Theater Freiburg. In 1989, he became the 1st Kapellmeister at the Landestheater Detmold, where he was interim Generalmusikdirektor (GMD) the following season. He was in the same position at the Hessisches Staatstheater Wiesbaden in the 1996/97 season.

In 1997, he became chief conductor of the Opera Krakowska. He first conducted at the Deutsche Oper Berlin in 1998, followed by regular appearances until 2003. The same year, he also became conductor and artistic director of the Swiss Youth Symphony Orchestra (SJSO), a position he held until his death. In 2016 they performed at Tonhalle St. Gallen. He celebrated the orchestra's 50th anniversary in 2020, due to the COVID-19 pandemic with a reduced group. In 2021, he led the orchestra in an event of the Lucerne Festival, themed "Music for Future". They played Mozart's Piano Concerto No. 21 and Beethoven's First Symphony, standing throughout, with well-balanced sound and dedication to detail. In April 2022 they were part of Through the Night's episode "Europe's Young Performers", a BBC Radio 3 program.

Bumann was musical director of the Warsaw Chamber Opera from 2003 to 2013, beginning with Verdi's Falstaff. They toured to France, Spain, and to Japan in 2004 and 2006. He was also chief conductor of the Polish Baltic Philharmonic from 2008 to 2012. From 2013, he was first guest conductor of the Łódź Philharmonic.

Bumann was chief conductor of the two orchestras of the Bromberg Philharmonie from 2015, and also became professor of conducting at the Stanisław Moniuszko Academy of Music in Gdańsk in 2010. He was named Professor of Art by the Polish President, Andrzej Duda, in 2021.

Bumann was a friend of many personalities in Polish cultural life, and conducted the world premiere of Krzysztof Penderecki's Lacrimosa No. 2 for soprano, chorus and chamber orchestra, one of the composer's last works, on 6 October 2018.

Bumann died on 2 June 2022 in a hospital in Nowy Targ of a heart attack, aged 60. He was buried in Łopuszna.

== Awards and honors ==
- 1994: Second prize at the Geneva International Music Competition
- 2014: Medal for Merit to Culture – Gloria Artis

== Recordings ==
- 2006: Bartók: Viola Concerto, Peter Mieg: Triple concerto dans le gôut italien, Dvořák: Symphony No. 8; with Lea Boesch (viola), Schweizer Jugend-Sinfonie-Orchester
- 2008: Feliks Janiewicz, Violin Concertos No. 3 and 5, with Zbigniew Pilch (violin), Musicae Antiquae Collegium Varsoviense, TAKT PMC 057
- 2016: Mahler, Ninth Symphony; Schweizer Jugend-Sinfonie-Orchester, live recording.
- 2017: Przeboje 55-lecia, works by J. S. Bach and W. A. Mozart, with Helena Bregar (soprano), Tomasz Gluska (trompet), Capella Bydgostiensis; DUX 1427

== Writing ==
- Bumann, Kai (2014). "Der Dirigent in der Oper - der Dirigent im Konzertsaal : eine kurze Orientierung für junge Dirigenten, die am Beginn ihres Studiums stehen" [The conductor in the opera - the conductor in the concert hall : a short orientation for young conductors at the beginning of their studies] (PDF). Aspekty Muzyki. 4: 171–178 – via BazHum - Polish History Museum.
- ——— (2010). "Patriotyzm po europejsku. Ankieta" [European-style Patriotism. A Survey]. Znak (664). Społeczny Instytut Wydawniczy Znak: 36, 39. ISSN 0044-488X – via chtyvo.org.ua.
