= Polish Reformed Church =

Reformed Protestant church in Poland established in the 16th century

Evangelical Reformed Church in the Republic of Poland
- Kościół Ewangelicko-Reformowany w RP
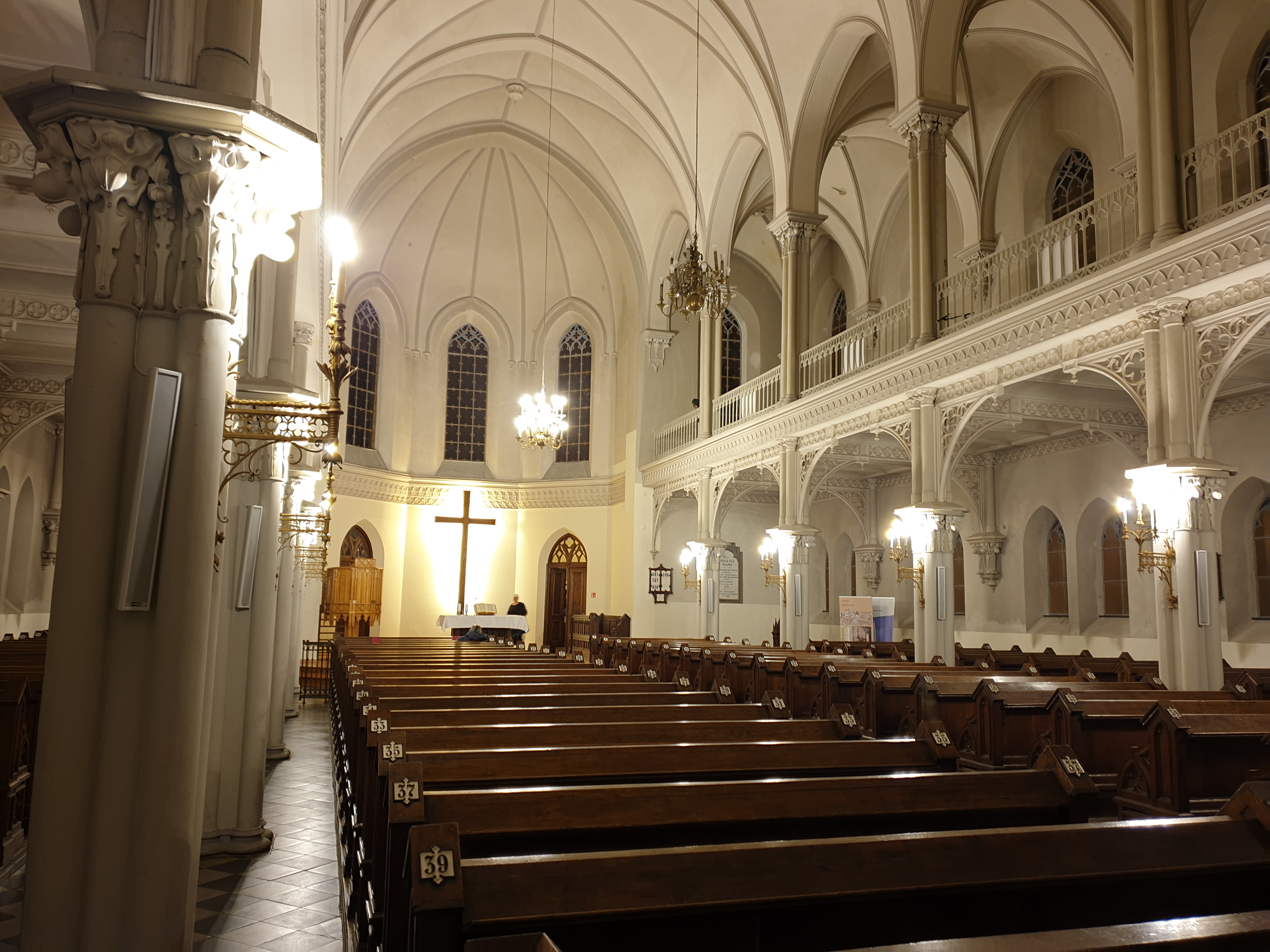
- Reformed church in Warsaw (Solidarności Avenue)
- Classification: Protestant
- Orientation: Calvinism
- Origin: 16th century
- Congregations: 8
- Members: 3,461 (2015)

The Polish Reformed Church, officially called the Evangelical Reformed Church in the Republic of Poland (Polish: Kościół Ewangelicko-Reformowany w RP) is a historic Calvinistic Protestant church in Poland established in the 16th century, still in existence today.

== Structure and organisation ==
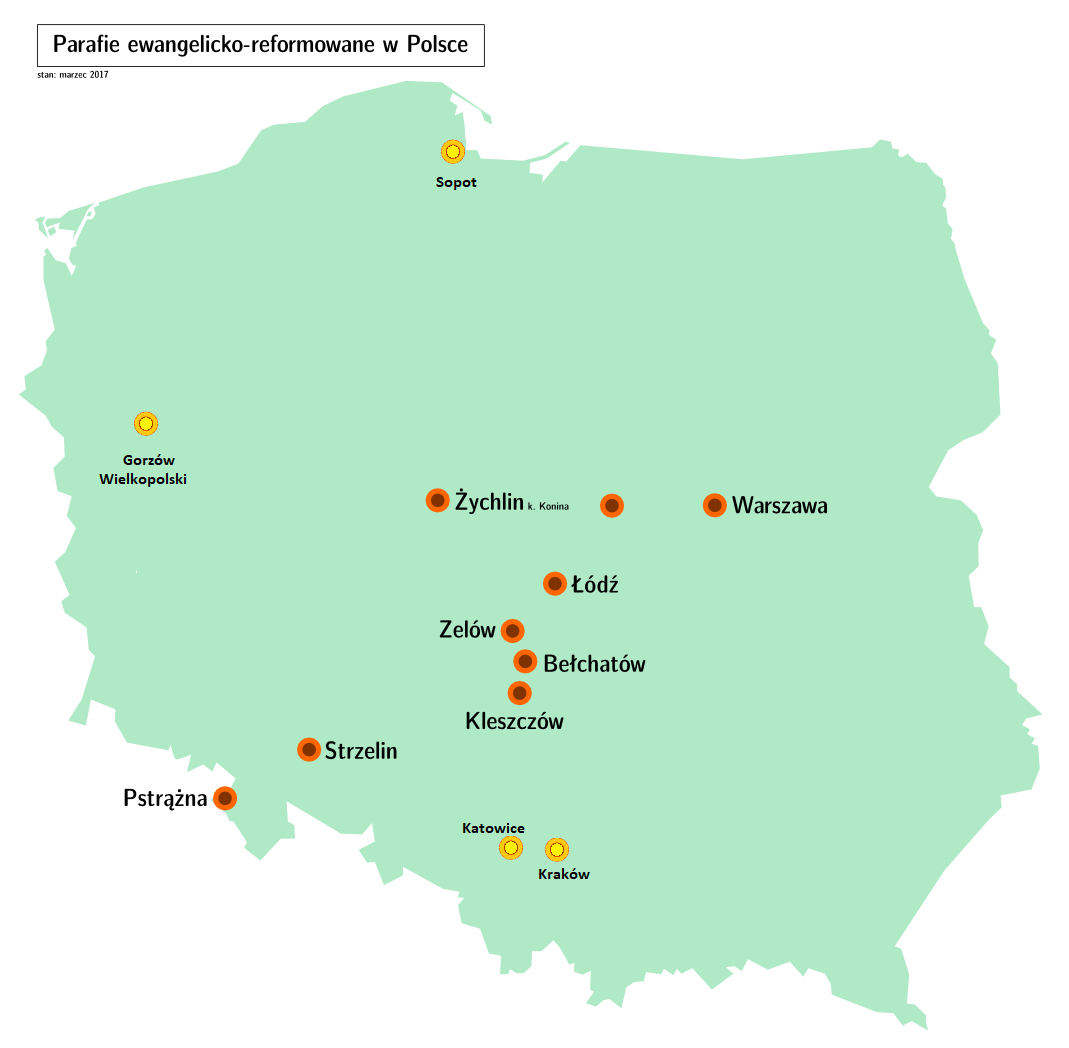
Locations of all eight congregations

According to Poland's Central Statistical Office, the Polish Reformed Church has 3,461 members (2015). The majority of church members live in central Poland; in 2014 out of a total number of 3464 adherents, 1800 lived in Łódź Voivodeship and 1000 in the city of Warsaw. There are eight congregations in Poland:

- Warsaw
- Łódź
- Zelów
- Bełchatów
- Kleszczów
- Żychlin
- Strzelin
- Pstrążna (part of the town of Kudowa-Zdrój)

Furthermore, emerging congregations exist in some other cities, including Poznań, Wrocław, and Gdańsk. In 2003, the Church ordained its first female minister and two more female students are in training. The Polish Reformed Church is a minority church in Poland, where roughly 71% of the people were Catholics in 2021.

== History ==
=== 16th-18th centuries ===
The Polish Reformed movement goes back to the half of the 16th century when the teachings of Swiss Reformers like Zwingli and Calvin began to make their way to Poland. Earlier, Lutheranism had made way to Poland, especially in the cities. A great boost to the Calvinist Reformation movement happened when in 1525, the devout Catholic king Sigismund I the Old (1506–48) accepted as his vassal in Ducal Prussia, the Lutheran prince Albert I, Duke of Prussia, thus creating the first Protestant country in the World. Though the king opposed "new thought", humanists all across the Polish-Lithuanian union began studying Calvinist theology. The most celebrated and influential group was found in the country's capital Kraków, where they flocked around the book printer and vendor Jan Trzecielski grouping nobles, burghers, professors, priests. The first Calvinist church service was held in 1550 in Pińczów a little town nearby Kraków, where the local noble owner converted to the Reformed Faith, expelled the monks, ’purging’ the city church. Other nobles soon followed suit and the first Calvinist synod in Lesser Poland was held in 1554 in Słomniki, close to Kraków. Thus, the Lesser Poland Brethren (Jednota Małopolska) was formed.

In the meantime, in the North of Poland, another Calvinist church was formed. The Czech Brethren, persecuted by the Czech king Ferdinand I Habsburg fled to Greater Poland (1548), where they settled in the estates of the local aristocrats whom they very quickly converted to their faith. The number of their congregations quickly swelled from 20 in 1555 to 64 in 1570. Their main centre was the city of Leszno, where they were settled under the patronage of the devotedly Reformed Leszczyński family. Thus the Czech Brethren, also called the Greater Poland Brethren (Jednota Wielkopolska), was formed. The Greater Poland and the Lesser Poland Brethren did try to cooperate more closely and even signed in 1555 a Union agreement but the Lesser Poland's Reformed nobles who formed the bulwark of the church members found the Czechs to be too hierarchical and undemocratic, and in the end the Lesser Poland Brethren became a strongly synodal structure, while the Greater Poland church became more Presbyterian.

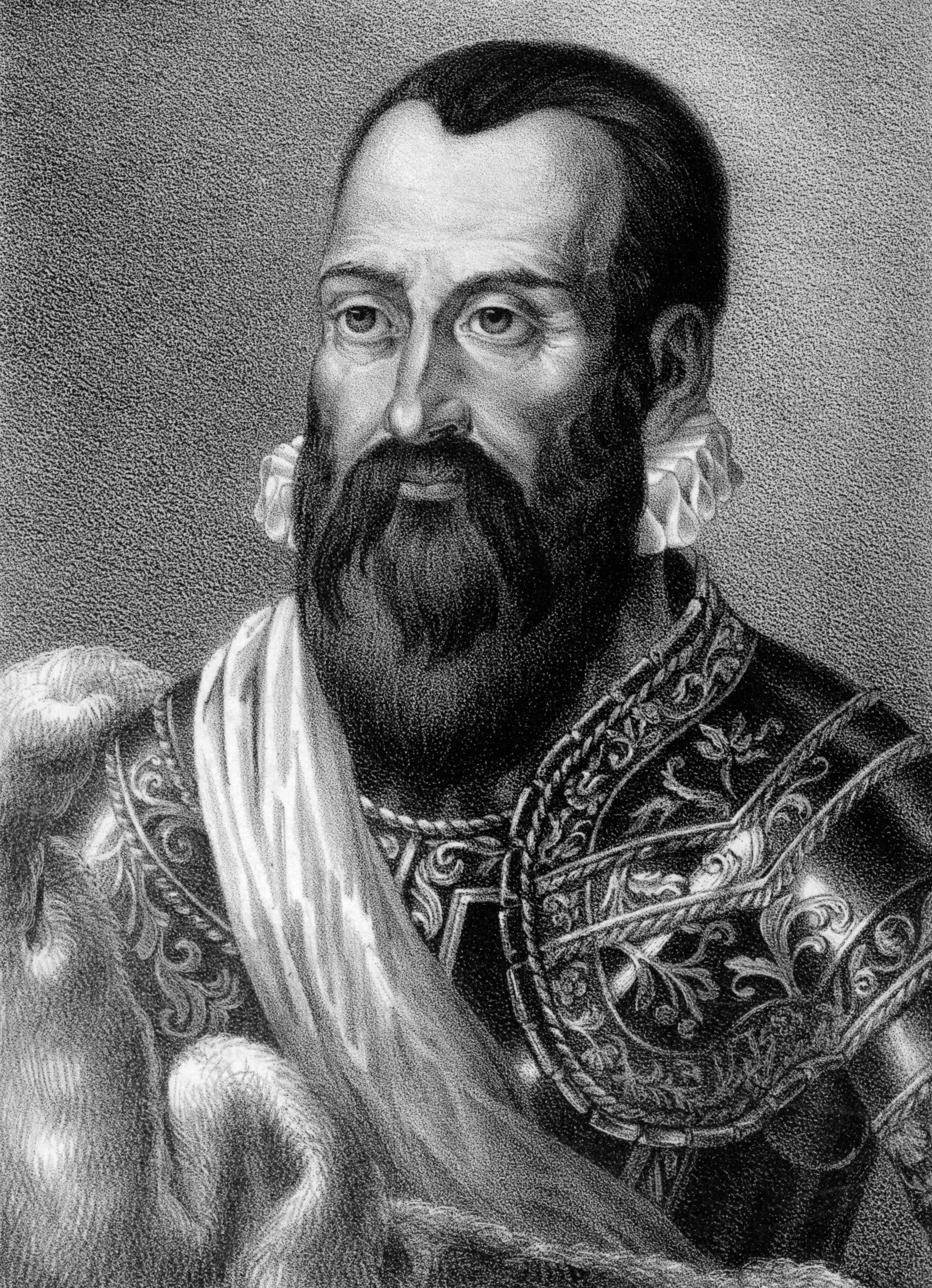
Mikołaj "the Black" Radziwiłł

The Reformation in the Grand Duchy of Lithuania (today's Lithuania, Belarus, and Ukraine) date to 1552 when the local aristocrat Mikołaj "the Black" Radziwiłł received a Reformed preacher, although some of Reformation ideas were known in Sigismund II Augustus palace because of returned educated Lithuanian Abraomas Kulvietis, who had founded school and taught children in Lutheran manner. He was generally unpopular among the Catholic hierarchy because of his Lutheran beliefs, and when the queen was away in 1542 Abraomas was forced to leave the country. Soon he (Radziwiłł "The Black") was followed by his cousin Mikołaj "the Red" Radziwiłł and other aristocrats. The reformer Jan Łaski worked for King Sigismund II from 1556 onwards. The first synod was held in 1557, and two years later the Lithuanians signed a Union agreement with the Lesser Poland Brethren. A huge number of converts were attracted from Orthodox nobility. While the nobles used Polish in church services, an effort was made to convert the Lithuanian-speaking peasants and serfs, but since Lithuanian did not have a written form till the second half of the 19th century, Polish stayed as the official church language. Thus, the Lithuanian Brethren (Jednota Litewska) came into being.

In 1556, John a Lasco (Jan Łaski) returned from Western Europe to help with the organisation of the Polish Reformed church. Seeing that the new king Sigismund II Augustus was sympathetic to the Calvinist cause, he tried to write a confession that would be agreeable not only to all the three Calvinist churches but to the Lutherans as well. Unfortunately, exhausted from overwork, he died in 1560, having achieved only the consolidation of the Lesser Reformed Brethren, which shortly afterwards was weakened by the split of the Unitarians (1563). In the same year, the Second Helvetic Confession was translated to Polish and was adopted by the Lithuanian and Lesser Poland Brethren. Łaski has been called the ‘Father of the Polish Reformed Church’.

In a posthumous tribute to John a Lasco, the Czech Brethren, the two Calvinist and Lutheran churches in Poland agreed in 1570 to the Confession of Sandomir (Konfesja Sandomierska), which was an irenic translation of the Second Helvetic Confession and in theory formed one, united, Protestant church. The strength of the Polish Protestants was shown when in 1573 a law was passed foreboding any persecution based on religion, an act unprecedented in Europe of that time. The Protestants formed also over 65% members of the Lower and just about a half of the Upper Houses of Parliament.

Religions in the Polish-Lithuanian Commonwealth in 1573 Reformed areas

The Calvinists opened schools in Pińczów, Leszno, Kraków, Vilnius, Kėdainiai and Słuck. They also printed the first complete Bible in Polish, commissioned by Mikołaj "the Black" Radziwiłł in 1563 in Brest-Litovsk.and translated by Jan Łaski. Radziwiłł also worked to change state laws to bring equal rights for reformers, as well as creating several churches in his estates. Though grouping mainly nobles and aristocrats, it managed to have some following among the peasantry as well. In some regions the number of Reformed parishes completely outnumbered the Roman Catholic ones, though in proportion the movement probably never exceeded 20% of the total population and 45% of nobility. At the same time the movement was rising in strength, there were signs of Catholic revival. Jesuits were invited to Poland by the clergy in 1565, and these friars soon advocated more stringent methods of combating ‘heresy’. Religious riots followed, which managed to expel Protestants from the main cities of Poland (Kraków, Poznań, Lublin) with the important exception of Wilno. The Unitarian split seriously weakened the church, and in 1595, the Calvinist-Lutheran Union fell apart.

The new staunchly Catholic king, Sigismund III Vasa, refused to promote any Protestants and from the beginning of the 17th century the church found itself in a serious defensive, with all three Brethren losing churches and followers. The brief respite they got during the reign of king Wladyslaw IV Vasa (1632–48) was followed by civil wars, wars with Sweden, Russia and Turkey which ravaged the country for latter half of the century. By then, only a handful of faithful remained in all three Brethren, with the Lithuanian one now leading the other three. Nearly all the aristocrats converted to Catholicism, and the last Protestant in the Senate (a Lutheran) died in 1668. The rise of intolerance began in 1658, when Unitarians were expelled from the country, and conversion from Catholic Christianity was punishable by death. Finally, in 1717 the Protestant nobility were stripped of all their political rights, which were only reinstated to them in 1768. Though a small number of Huguenots settled in Poland at the end of the 17th century (Gdańsk, Warsaw), the numbers dwindled. By 1768, the number of Reformed churches has dwindled to 40 from 500 by 1591.

In 1768, under pressure from Orthodox Russia and Protestant Prussia, the Polish Diet reluctantly reinstated political rights to the Polish nobility, as well as granting nearly full freedom of worship and religion - only the prohibition of abjuring from Catholicism was maintained. Under the enlightened king Stanisław August Poniatowski (1764–95), the Calvinists quickly began to rebuild themselves from ruins. New churches in Poznań, Piaski etc. were constructed. In the capital Warsaw, a new congregation organised itself and erected a new church (1776). This congregation had a multicultural outlook, as apart from Polish nobles it consisted of merchants of Scottish, English, Swiss, Huguenot, Dutch and German origin. Services were held in Polish, German and French.

Church organisation also consolidated and in 1777, in the Lesser Poland's congregation of Sielec, a union was signed between the Polish Reformed and Lutherans, and the Union of Sandomir was once again reaffirmed. A common consistory was established with six members, in equal number from the Calvinists and Lutherans, two being clergy, two being burghers and two being nobles. Though this union was short-lived (dissolved in 1782), the Protestants in Poland continued to grow and expand, especially in Warsaw, whose congregation soon overshadowed any other church centre. This optimistic period was cut short by the three Partitions of Poland by Prussia, Russia and Austria (1772, 1793, 1795) which led to the disappearance of Poland for over a century from the map of Europe.

=== The Polish Reformed without Poland (1795–1918) ===
The beginnings were not easy. The Greater Poland Brethren was incorporated in 1817 to the Prussian Evangelical Union Church as a separate district (Kirchenprovinz Posen, i.e. ecclesiastical province of Posen) but without any autonomy. Between 1829 and 1853, Bishop Carl Andreas Wilhelm Freymark (1785–1855) led the Posen ecclesiastical province as general superintendent. Under constant pressure from the Prussian government by the mid-19th century, the United Church abandoned Polish in its liturgy and most of the old Calvinist nobles chose to convert to Catholicism rather than to become Germans. In Austria too, the parishes were incorporated to the Evangelical Church of Augsburg and Helvetian Confession in Austria, but forming a seniorate of its own separate from those for the Lutherans.

During the 19th century the number of Polish Reformed parishes shrank from 4 to just one in Kraków. There, the Calvinists shared the parish with Lutherans, and these became so dominant that from 1828, only Lutheran pastors were called to the pulpit, though a handful of Calvinists survived.

Polish Calvinism was maintained in land taken by Russia. The Warsaw congregation led by outstanding members dominated the rump Lesser Poland Brethren and became a leader of the denomination. The Lithuanian Brethren maintained its synodal structure and Polish outlook, and in the beginning of the 19th century erected a monumental church in Vilnius.

The number of Reformed were growing too: in 1803, a colony of Czech settlers founded a town and congregation of Zelów. Under the energetic Superintendent Karol Diehl (who died in 1831) in 1829 another administrative union was signed with Lutherans. The predominance of the more numerous Lutherans in the new consistory of the Calvinists, as well as the unsuccessful November Uprising in 1830 led the Tsar Nicolas I of Russia to dissolve the Union in 1849. Under the new decree separate Lutheran and Reformed churches were formed. The Lesser Poland Brethren was dissolved its six parishes merged into one (in Sielec) and now put under the charge of the Consistory in Warsaw. This new church was called (unofficially) the Warsaw Brethren. The Lithuanian Brethren was spared dissolution, though its schools were taken away by the Russian state.

The rest of the 19th century saw a slow growth of the Reformed movement in Poland, though proportionally to the rest of the Polish population their percentage declined. New congregations were established in Lublin (1852), Seirijai (1852), Suwałki (1852). The Czechs from Zelów migrated to other parts of Poland and there they formed new congregations: in Kuców (1852), Żyrardów (1852) and Łódź (1904). Despite severe Russian repression after the January Uprising (1863) in which many Reformed nobles were implicated and active, the church remained Polish and slowly absorbed and Polonised new immigrant groups that settled in the country. The growth of the church would have been more impressive, had it not suffered from an acute shortage of ministers: for example in the 1880 there were just 5 pastors serving 10 congregations.

Things were not going so well for the Lithuanian Brethren. Its estates were confiscated in 1841 and after 1866 the church was forced to conduct its administrative business and synods in Russian. The number of congregations went down to 12, though 2 new were founded in the course of the 19th century by Czech settlers from Zelów. The church managed to avoid any nationalistic conflict between its Lithuanian peasant members and the still predominant Polish nobles.

At the beginning of the 20th century, a number of Polish Calvinists from Żyrardów, Kuców, and Zelów emigrated to the United States and in 1915, a Polish Presbyterian parish was formed in Baltimore, Maryland; this parish existed until 1941.

=== Independent Poland (1918–39) ===
Congregations (examples)

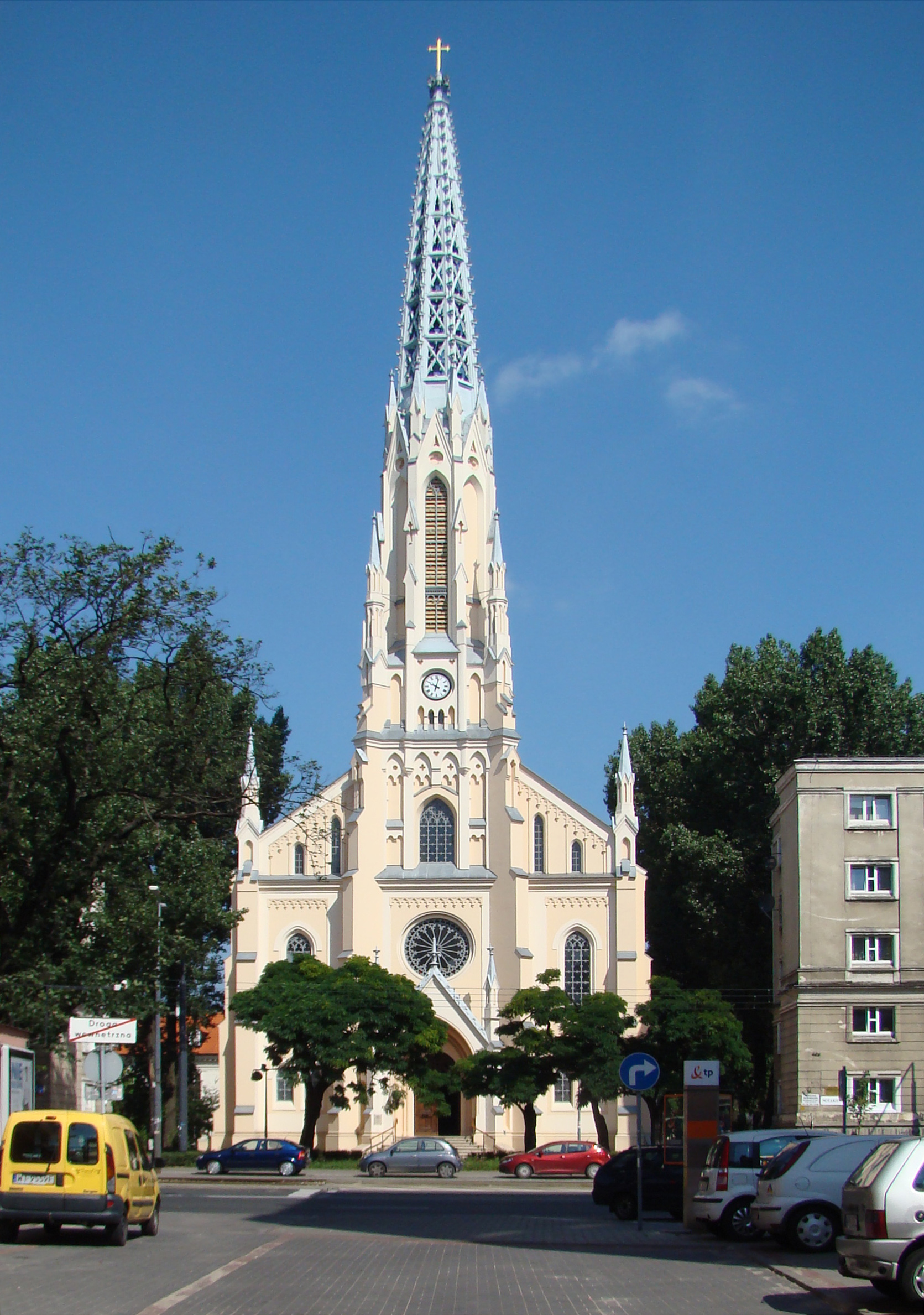
Warsaw

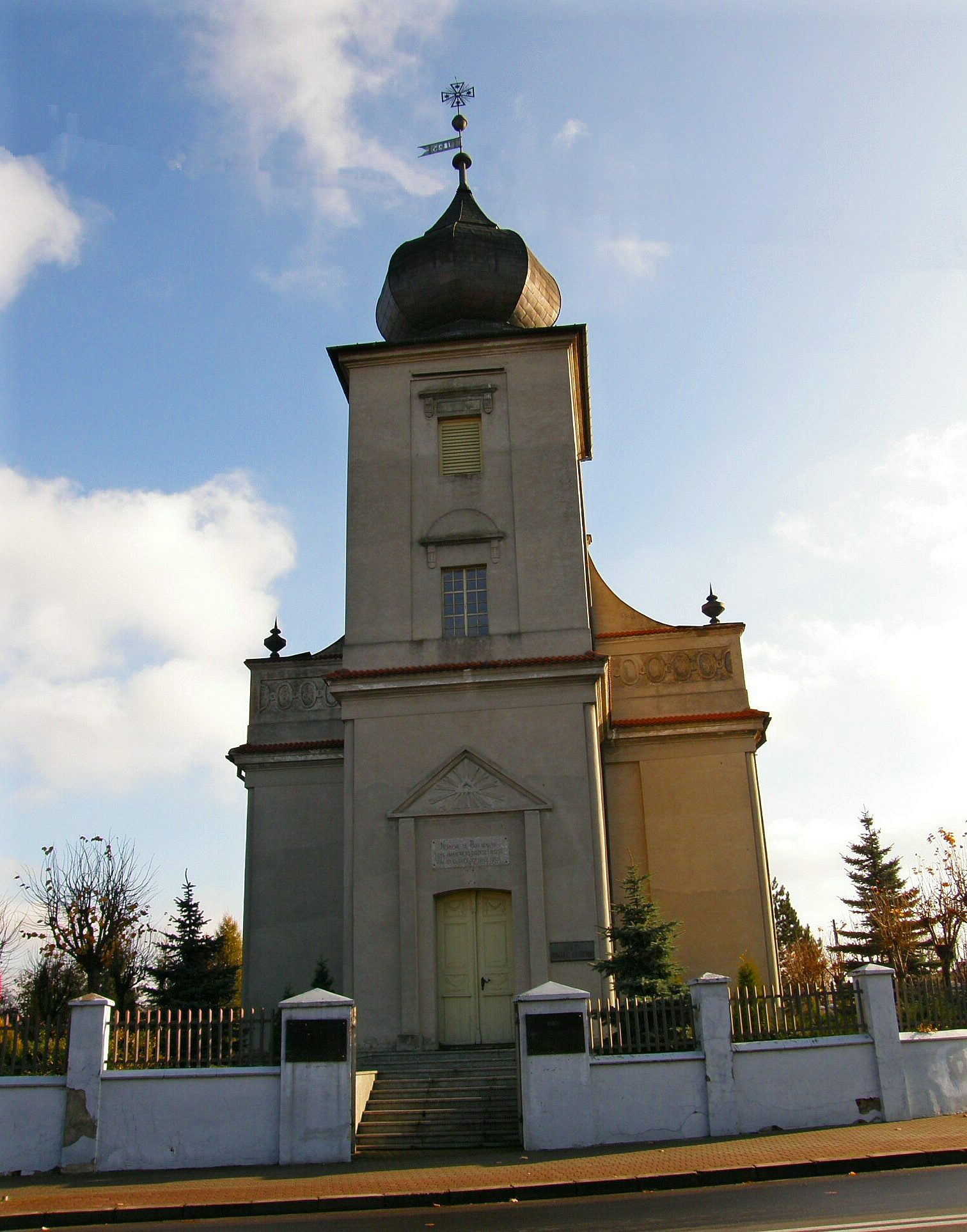
Zelów

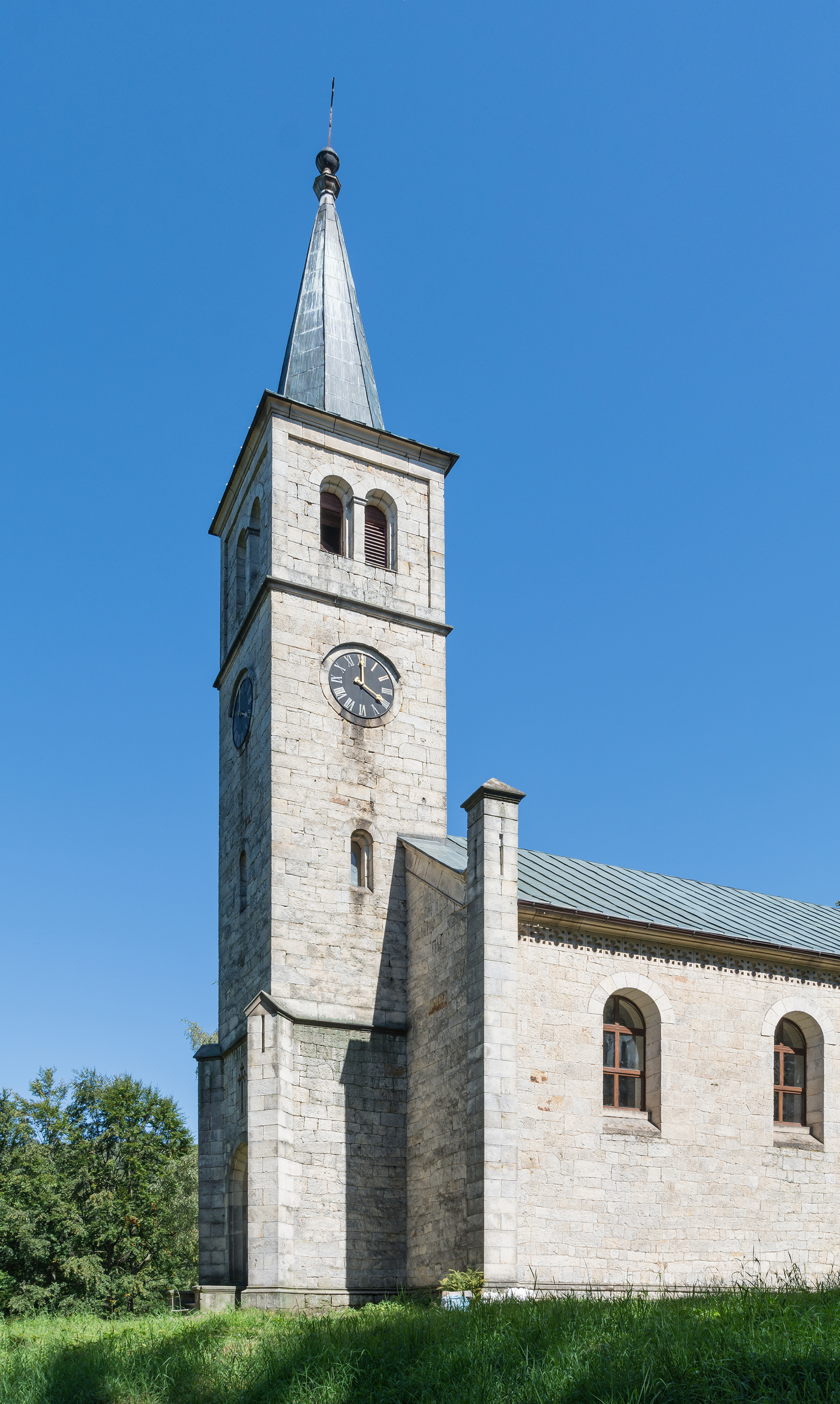
Pstrążna

Immediately after Poland regained its independence, both the Warsaw and Lithuanian Brethren expressed joy at the occasion and a desire to unite into one church. In 1918, the Warsaw Brethren allowed women full voting rights in church assemblies, congregations and synods. Until the 1930s both churches grew rapidly. The Warsaw Brethren organised new congregations in Toruń, Poznań, Lwów (today Lviv in Ukraine) and Kraków. Due to missionary activity, a few thousands of Ukrainians were converted to Calvinism from Eastern Orthodoxy and organised into a semi-independent synod within the Warsaw Brethren. In 1926, the church started to publish a two-weekly church newspaper "Jednota" (Brethren) which still exists today.

The Lithuanian Brethren suffered huge loses, when the Lithuanian parishes formed themselves into a separate church in independent Lithuania, as well as they lost to Soviet Russia the old church centres such as Słuck, Kojdanów, Minsk etc. The Brethren, now left with only 4 congregations (Wilno, Izabellin, Niepokojczyce, Michajłówka) rebuilt itself by incorporating Polish Anglicans (mainly converts from Judaism) into a separate synod, as well as by mission to Ukrainians and Belarusians. Despite repeated attempt to unite themselves, the two churches remained separate, and in the 1930s even hostile after the Wilno Consistory engaged itself into a lucrative yet dubious business of granting easy divorces. Union talks were resumed in 1939 but were interrupted by the outbreak of World War II.

By 1939, the Warsaw Brethren had over 20,000 members, and the Lithuanian Brethren ca. 5,000 members. Apart from these two churches, the United Evangelical Church in Poland (Kościół Ewangelicko-Unijny w Polsce), which had assumed independence from the Church of the old-Prussian Union, had ca. 3,000 Calvinists, and the Evangelical Church of Augsburg and Helvetian Confession in Lesser Poland (Kościoł Ewangelicki Augsburskiego i Helweckiego Wyznania w Małopolsce), having emerged from the Polish part of the old united Austrian Church, had ca. 2,000, thus bringing the total number of Reformed in Poland to ca. 30,000 members. These included Poles of Polish, Czech, Lithuanian, German, Ukrainian, Belarusian, and Jewish backgrounds.

=== World War II persecution (1939–45) ===
On 1 September 1939, Nazi Germany invaded Poland and on 17 September, so did the Soviet Union. After a desperate fight, Poland was occupied by Russia and Germany and the government went into exile by the end of the month. Both the Nazis and Soviets instigated a true reign of terror in the conquered territory. These measures affected the Reformed denominations. In the Nazi sector the entire Anglican Synod of the Wilno Brethren (ca. 1000 members) was wiped out. In Łódź, the pastor was first forbidden to preach in Polish. When he started to do so in Czech, was arrested by the Gestapo after the Christmas Eve service in 1940, deported to the Dachau concentration camp where he was murdered. The congregation was suppressed and services ceased. The same happened to congregations in Toruń, Poznań and Lublin.

The Warsaw parish survived under the leadership of General Superintendent Stefan Skierski, but, following the Warsaw Uprising, it was dispersed. Deportations, executions and forced labor decimated the church. Persecution persisted under the Soviet Union, with the Ukrainian Protestant population subject to deportations and nearly completely wiped out. The Wilno congregation was first subjected to the Lithuanian synod, and then Polish services were ordered to cease. The nobility and intelligentsia were hunted down and either executed or deported to Siberia. By 1945 the Wilno Brethren ceased to exist.

=== Under Communist regime (1945–89) ===
It took the Polish Reformed two years before they met in a Synod (1947). The old Rev. Skierski was chosen again as superintendent but he died exhausted and broken by the atrocities of the war. The situation of the church was dramatic: only three ministers were in Poland; the churches in present-day Lithuania and Belarus were lost to Soviets; the church in Sielec, and Tabor were seized as "German" by the Catholic population; Warsaw was completely destroyed by the Germans, although the church managed to survive.

The number of members was estimated to be at 5000, or nearly 1/6 the 1939 number. Still, it was dropping even more, as the German and Czech Calvinists were emigrating from Poland. Old Calvinist churches in West Poland were taken over by the Catholics who refused to give them back; the lack of pastors was acute till the end of the 1950s. Some Polish Reformed stayed in the West rather than come back to a Communist regime and formed the London Reformed Polish Church, that existed till 1991.

=== 21st century ===
In 2024, the Evangelical Reformed Parish in Warsaw, affiliated with the denomination, promoted, for the first time in the country, blessings for same-sex unions. The ceremony blessed 10 couples and was co-celebrated by Roman Catholic and Lutheran clergy.

== See also ==
- Polish Brethren
- Mikolaj Wysocki
