= Three Miniatures for Clarinet and Piano =

Composition by Krzysztof Penderecki

Three Miniatures for Clarinet and Piano is an early work by Polish composer Krzysztof Penderecki. It was finished in 1956, but was premiered four years later.

The Three Miniatures were composed when Penderecki was only 23 and still a music student. They were dedicated to Władysław Kosieradzki, who was the clarinet professor at the Academy of Music in Kraków, and were premiered by the dedicatée at the clarinet and Zbigniew Jeżewski at the piano in the 1958 Polish Composers' Union concert, which took place in November 17. The score was published afterwards by the Polish Music Publishing House and Belwin-Mills.

== Analysis ==
This composition consists of three short miniatures which take 1 to 1:30 minutes each to perform. The general mood and style of the work differs from the following works and shows no signs of Penderecki's later radicalism, in the sense that these miniatures are not focused on the sonority of the instruments to generate atmospheres, probably influenced by Béla Bartók. The miniatures were titled as follows:

1. Allegro
2. Andante cantabile
3. Allegro ma non troppo

The two outer movements are active and fast, while the middle one is slower and more meditative.

== Reception ==
The Miniatures were negatively received by critics. Vincent McDermott, from The Musical Quarterly, described the whole set of miniatures as "dull". However, the miniatures were some of the few early compositions accepted for publication.

== Notable recordings ==
Following are some of the most well-known recordings of this piece:

| Clarinet | Piano | Record Company | Year of Recording | Format |
|---|---|---|---|---|
| Lev Mikhailov | Alexei Lubimov | Melodiya | 1970 | LP |
| Kjell-Inge Stevensson | Eva Knardahl | BIS Records | 1976 | CD |
| Brian Schweickhart | John Cobb | Coronet Records | 1981 | LP |
| Claude Faucomprez | Alain Raës | Solstice Records | 1983 | LP |
| Walter Boeykens | Robert Groslot | Terpsichore Records | 1983 | LP |
| Melvin Warner | Sylvia Reynolds | Crystal Records | 1985 | LP and CD |
| Joaquín Valdepeñas | Patricia Parr | CBC Records | 1987 | CD |
| Sabine Meyer | Alfons Kontarsky | EMI | 1989 | LP |
| Aleksander Romański | Szábolcs Esztényi | WERGO | 1993 | CD |
| Michel Lethiec | Juhani Lagerspetz | Naxos | 2001 | CD |
