= Clarinet Quartet (Penderecki) =

Musical composition by Krzysztof Pendereck

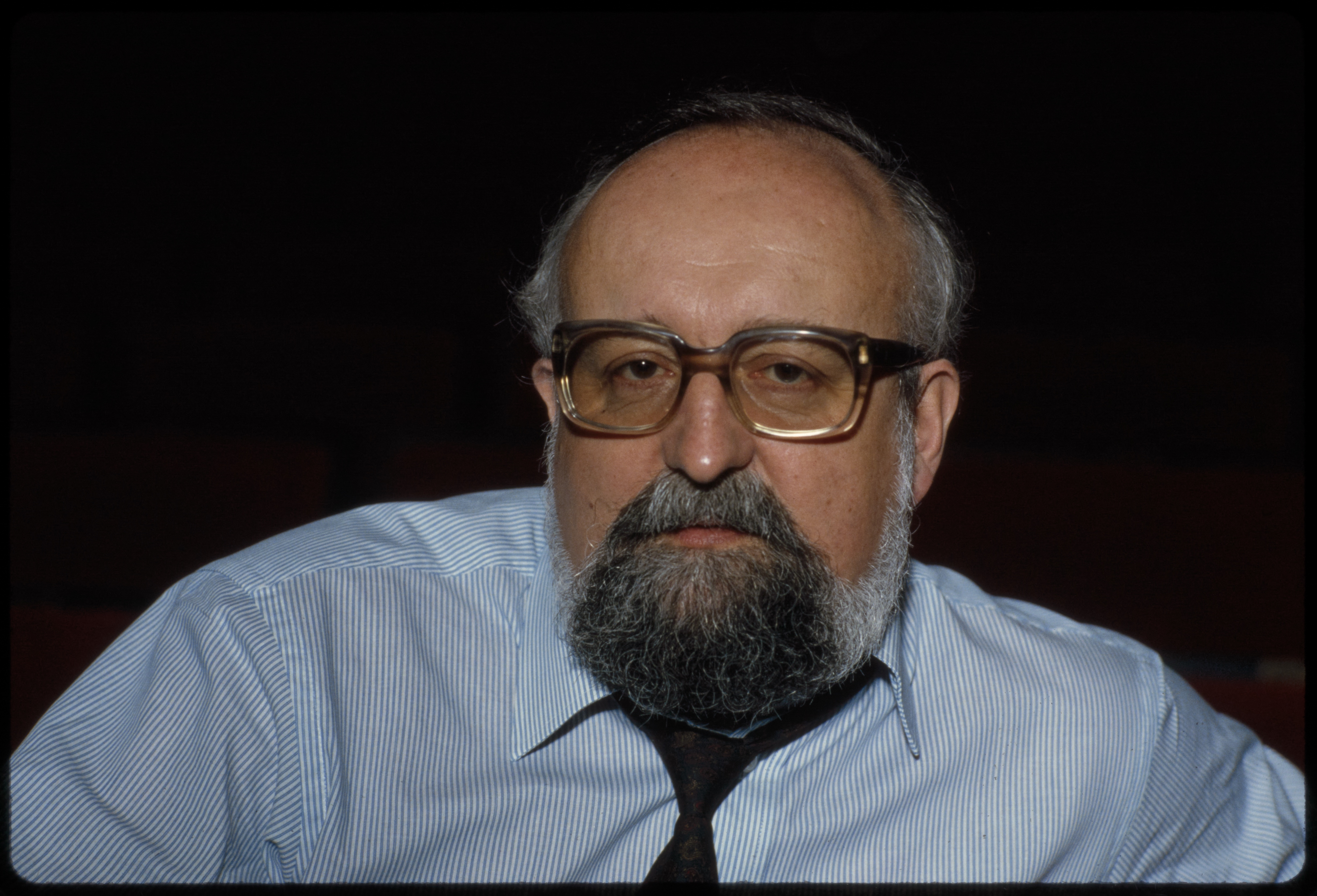
Krzysztof Penderecki

The Clarinet Quartet, also known as Quartet for Clarinet and String Trio, is a chamber work for clarinet, violin, viola, and cello by Polish composer Krzysztof Penderecki. It was finished in 1993.

== Composition and premiere ==
This composition was dedicated to Ake Holmquist and premiered in Lübeck on August 13, 1993. For this performance, Israeli clarinetist Sharon Kam, German violinist Christoph Poppen, American violist Kim Kashkashian, and collaborator and Russian cellist Boris Piergamienszczikow played the work under the baton of Penderecki himself. These musicians also performed the piece to be broadcast in television, also with Penderecki as conductor. It was later published by Schott Music.

Harry Kinross-White also wrote an arrangement of this composition for saxophone quartet in 1999. The first performance of this arrangement took place in the Dresden Days of Contemporary Music in 1999 by Raschèr Saxophone Quartet.

== Analysis ==
The Clarinet Quartet takes approximately 15 minutes to perform and is in four movements. The movement list is as follows:

1. Notturno. Adagio
2. Scherzo. Vivacissimo
3. Serenade. Tempo di Valse
4. Abschied. Larghetto

== Reception ==
This composition received universal acclaim, both in the first performance and in recordings. In the premiere, the composition was played twice due to audience demand. According to Lutz Lesle, the composition was inspired by Schubert's String Quintet.

== Notable recordings ==
Following are some of the most well-known recordings of this piece:

Clarinet	Violin	Viola	Cello	Record Company	Year of Recording	Format
Sharon Kam	Christoph Poppen	Kim Kashkashian	Boris Piergamienszczikow	Sony	1993	CD and DVD
Martin Fröst	Patrick Swedrup	Ingegerd Kierkegaard	Helena Nilsson	BIS Records	1994	CD
Ulf Rodenhäuser	Ida Bieler	Enrique Santiago	Martin Ostertag	Musikproduktion Dabringhaus und Grimm	1997	CD
Donald Montanaro	Luis Biava	Sidney Curtiss	William Stokking	Boston Records	1996	CD
Michel Lethiec	Régis Pasquier	Bruno Pasquier	Arto Noras	Naxos	2001	CD

The saxophone quartet version has also been recorded by Raschèr Saxophone Quartet and released by BIS Records in 2001.
