= Faistauer =

Faistauer is a surname. Notable people with the surname include:

- Anton Faistauer (1887–1930), Austrian artist
- Rodolfo Faistauer, Brazilian pianist
