= Swiss Youth Symphony Orchestra =

Swiss symphony orchestra

Schweizer Jugend-Sinfonie-Orchester
- Youth orchestra
- Founded: 1969
- Location: Zürich
- Website: www.sjso.ch

The Schweizer Jugend-Sinfonie-Orchester (SJSO, Swiss Youth Symphony Orchestra) is a Swiss symphony orchestra of young people, founded in 1969. It is named Orchestre Symphonique Suisse des Jeunes in French, Orchestra Sinfonica Svizzera della Gioventù in Italian, and Orchestra Sinfonica Svizzera della Gioventegna in Rhaeto-Romance. It is organised as a foundation since 1982. It aims to include members from all regions of Switzerland. Musicians meets twice a year for rehearsals leading to tour in Switzerland. Kai Bumann was chief conductor from 1998 until his death in 2022. He introduced major symphonies such as Mahler's Ninth.

== History ==
The orchestra, as a youth orchestra for all four language regions of Switzerland, was conceived in the late 1960s by Roman Jann and Christoph Reimann, supported by sponsors. The founding meeting took place in 1969 in Zürich in the Zunfthaus zur Zimmerleuten (carpenter's guildhall), with founding members also including the flutist Dieter Flury. The first rehearsal was held on 29 April 1970, leading to a first concert on 2 January 1971 in the concert hall of the Laudinella hotel in St. Moritz. The hall has remained the residence for the orchestra for an annual week of rehearsals each spring. The orchestra was first a chamber orchestra, but grew to a symphony orchestra playing in concert halls of Switzerland. Some former members founded in 1999 the Camerata Schweiz. It is one of few cultural institutions for all language regions of Switzerland.

== Program ==
The orchestra members, around hundred young musicians between 15 and 25 from all regions of Switzerland meet twice a year for a session of several days of rehearsals for a tour, once in spring and once in the fall. They study a broad repertoire of classical music. They played a program with music by Schnyder, Shostakovich and Othmar Schoeck at the Lucerne Festival on 24 August 1991, conducted by Andreas Delfs. In a large formation, they performed Mahler's Ninth Symphony at the Tonhalle St. Gallen in 2016, conducted by Kai Bumann.

=== Chief conductors ===
- 1970–1971: Hans Rogner
- 1972–1984: Klaus Cornell
- 1984–1995: Andreas Delfs
- 1998–2022: Kai Bumann

Guest conductors, beginning in 1986, have included Heinrich Schiff, Nello Santi, Ludwig Wicki and Dominic Limburg.

== Foundation ==
A foundation was established on 12 December 1982, based in Zürich. to promote that aspiring young musicians gain practice in rehearsals and concerts, in order to improve their future professional work. Several former orchestra members went on to be members of orchestras in Switzerland and beyond. Another goal is an inter-language collaboration across the cultural regions of Switzerland. The foundation receives financial support from governments on national, Kanton and city levels, and by companies and a supporting association.
