= Prelude for Clarinet (Penderecki) =

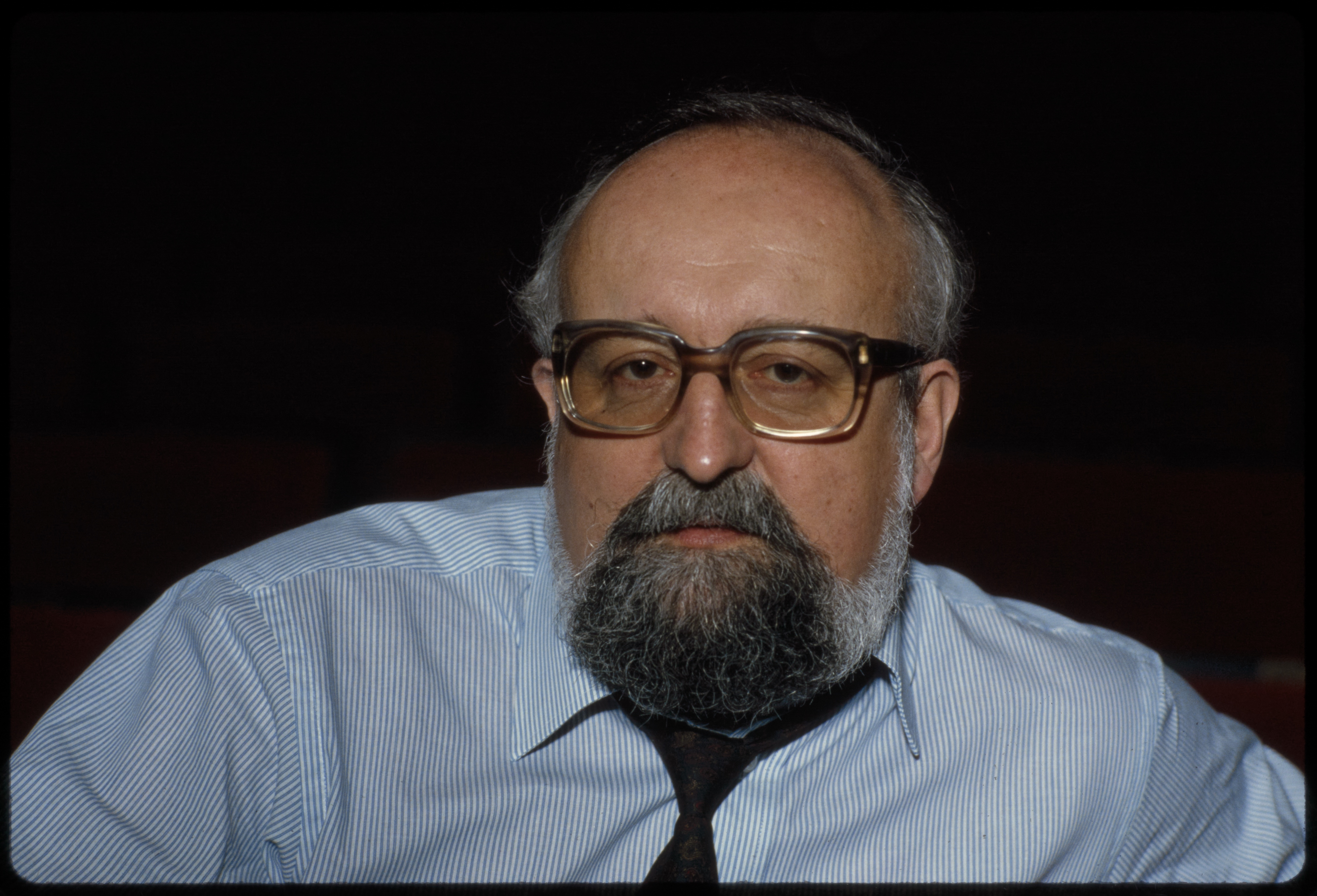
Krzysztof Penderecki in the 1980s

The Prelude for Clarinet in B♭ major, sometimes also referred to as Prelude for Solo Clarinet, is a work by Polish composer Krzysztof Penderecki. It was composed in 1987 and is one of the pieces from the series of compositions for solo instruments that Penderecki composed during the 1980s, such as Cadenza for Solo Viola (1984) and Per Slava (1986).

== Composition ==
The work was a gift for British composer Paul Patterson for his fortieth birthday. The composition did not receive a formal premiere due to its short length, but the first performance took place in Manchester, in December 1, 1987. Joanna Patton played it for the first time to the great public. It was published by the Polish Music Publishing House and Schott Music.

== Analysis ==
This composition is in one movements and takes approximately 3 minutes to perform. It is marked lento sostenuto at the beginning, which is the general tone of the piece. The composition is notated without bar lines, which transforms the piece into a pseudo-improvisatory composition, leaving the performer great room for expression. It starts with a low G being played in a pulsating manner and develops from there a sighing tone adding higher notes. Then the general mood of the composition becomes more fast and rampant, until a high-pitched glissando is reached, returning slowly to the G played at the beginning.

== Notable recordings ==
Following are some of the most well-known recordings of this piece:

Clarinet	Record Company	Year of Recording	Format
Aleksander Romański	WERGO	1993	CD
Martin Fröst	BIS Records	1994	CD
Ulf Rodenhäuser	Musikproduktion Dabringhaus und Grimm	1997	CD
Karl Leister	Camerata	1998	CD
Michel Lethiec	Naxos	2001	CD
