= Cello Concerto No. 1 (Penderecki) =

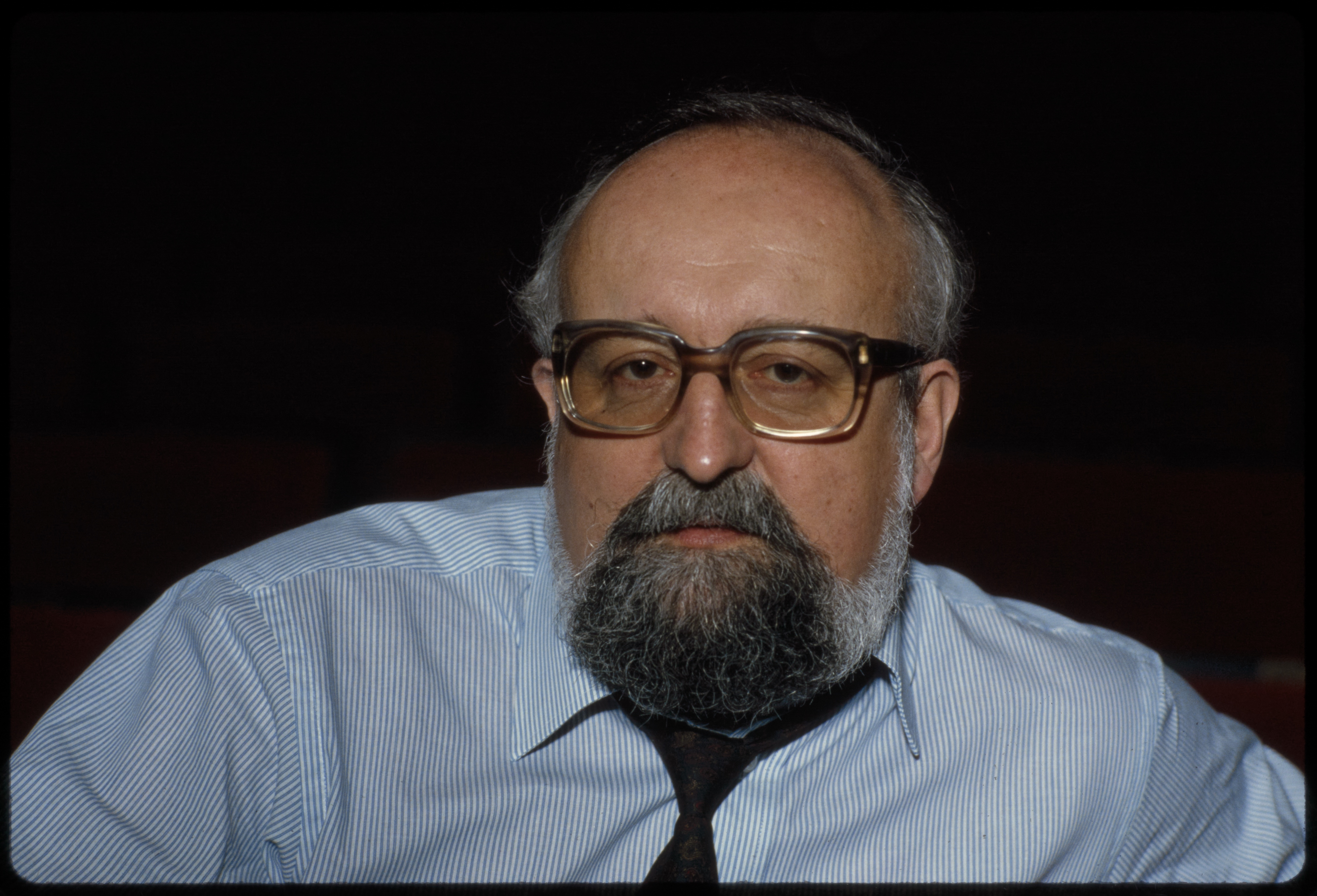
Krzysztof Penderecki in the 1980s

Krzysztof Penderecki's Cello Concerto No. 1 is a composition that was adapted from an earlier, unpublished and unrecorded work by Penderecki, the Concerto per violino grande e orchestra. The concerto was transcribed for cello in 1973.

== Composition and premiere ==
The concerto was commissioned by Bronisław Eichenholz, and was originally conceived for a violino grande, an instrument with five strings that combines the ranges of the violin and the viola. The concerto was completed in 1967 and premiered in Östersund on July 1, 1967, with Eichenholz playing the violino grande and the Royal Stockholm Philharmonic Orchestra conducted by Henryk Czyż. However, this version of the concerto was performed only twice and did not gain significant attention. After the initial performances, it was performed once more at the Hopkins Center Congregation of the Arts during the Fourth International Webern Festival at Dartmouth College in New Hampshire.

Five years later, Penderecki decided to transcribe the concerto for cello, replacing the violino grande. This new version was dedicated to Siegfried Palm, who premiered it on September 7, 1972, at the Edinburgh Festival. The transcribed version of the concerto was subsequently published by the Polish Music Publishing House and Moeck Musikinstrumente + Verlag.

== Analysis ==
The original version of the Concerto consisted of two movements, titled Quasi purgatorio and Suoni celeste. However, the final version is condensed into a single movement, with a performance time of approximately 15 to 20 minutes. The concerto begins with a lento introduction that features an initial cadenza, which was specifically composed for some of its performances.

== Reception ==
Although the first version of the concerto was performed only twice, it received positive reviews from critics. Shirley Fleming, writing for High Fidelity, described it as a fascinating piece.

== Notable recordings ==
Below are some of the most well-known recordings of this piece:

Cellist	Orchestra	Conductor	Record Label	Year of Recording	Format
Siegfried Palm	Polish Radio National Symphony Orchestra	Krzysztof Penderecki	EMI	1972	LP and CD
Arto Noras	Sinfonia Varsovia	Krzysztof Penderecki	Finlandia Records	2001	CD
