= Emendation =

An emendation is an alteration to a term, for a specific technical reason:

- Emendation (textual), altering a word to make sense, e.g. when incomplete or assumed to have been copied incorrectly
- Emendation (zoology), altering the spelling of the name of a taxon to comply with the rules
- In bacteriological taxonomy, altering a name for circumscription of a taxon

== See also ==
- Amendment
- Emanation (disambiguation)
