= Israel Piano Trio =

Classical piano trio

The Israel Piano Trio (Hebrew: שלישיית הפסנתר הישראלית) is a classical piano trio founded in 1972 by the pianist Alexander Volkov, the violinist Menahem Breuer, and the cellist Zvi Harell.

== Formation and members ==
The Israel piano trio was founded in Israel in 1972 by Alexander Volkov (piano), Menahem Breuer (violin), and Zvi Harell (cello). Zvi Harell was later replaced with Marcel Bergman, and later by Hillel Zori. After the death of Alexander Volkov in 2006, the pianist Tomer Lev joined the trio. As of 2011, the members are Roglit Ishay (piano), Menahem Breuer (violin), and Hillel Zori (cello).

== Repertoire and recordings ==
The trio's recordings include the complete piano trios of Brahms, Mendelssohn, Schubert and Schumann, as well as works by 20th century Israeli composers. The TV documentary "Mendelssohn returns to Leipzig" features a journey of the trio to Leipzig-Gewandhaus. The trio often performed for the BBC (including live broadcasts).

== Discography ==
- Schubert: Piano Trios, CRD 2411
- Brahms: Piano Trios, CRD 2412
- Schumann: Piano Trios, CRD 2413
- Mendelssohn: Piano Trios, CRD 3459
- Partos/Alotin/Ehrlich/Braun/Bloch/Copland, BTR 9504, 1996
