= Suite (Penderecki) =

Suite for cello by Krzysztof Penderecki

- by Krzysztof Penderecki
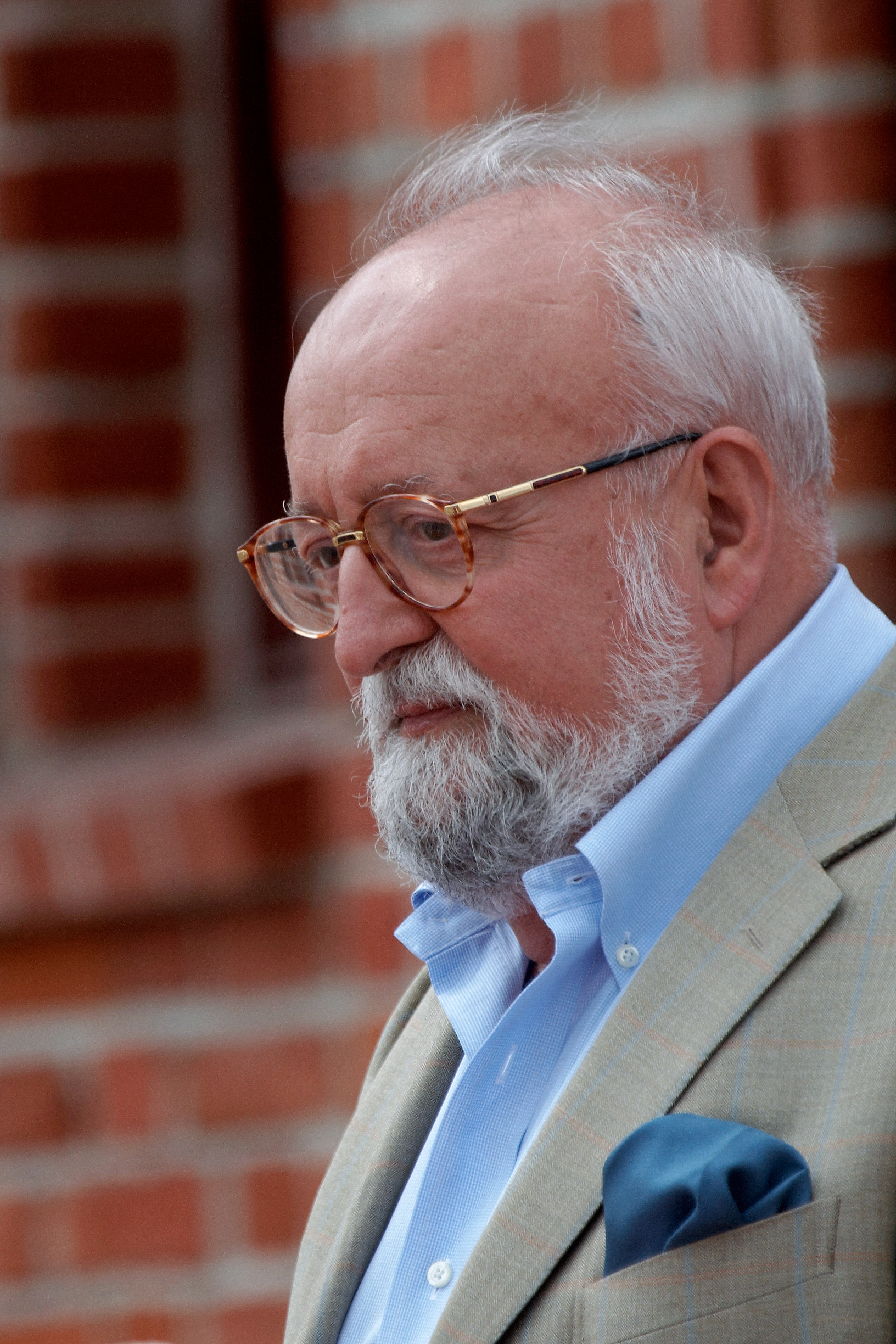
- Penderecki in 2008
- Period: Contemporary
- Form: Suite
- Composed: 1994 - 2013
- Published: 2014 (Note: Previously partially published as Divertimento.)
- Publisher: Schott Music
- Duration: 20 minutes
- Movements: 8
- Scoring: Cello

The Suite (formerly and alternatively entitled Divertimento) is a composition for solo cello by Polish composer Krzysztof Penderecki. The piece is well known for its typical chromatic melodies and for its recurrent use of pizzicati and col legno.

== Background ==
Initially entitled Divertimento, the Suite was written over the course of twenty years and had many additions and revisions. Penderecki initially wrote this suite for solo cello as part of a musical collaboration with fellow cellist Mstislav Rostropovich which started with the Cello Concerto No. 2 and which went on for more than twenty years. It consisted of only three movements: Serenade, Scherzo, and Notturno, all of them composed in 1994 and premiered on December 28, 1994, in Köln by Boris Pergamenschikow. The Suite was initially dedicated to Pergamenschikow and commissioned by KölnMusik.

The composition was later revisited many times over the years until its completion in 2013. Sarabande followed on June 15, 2001, performed by the dedicatee in Ludwigsburg. After that, Tempo di Valse was premiered at the Kronberg Academy in Kronberg, on October 21, 2004, in a memorial concert for Pergamenschikow performed by Claudio Bohórquez. The Aria was the next movement to be composed, which was premiered by Michel Strauss on September 2, 2006, at the Musée d'art américain in Giverny, at the Festival de Musique de Chamber à Giverny 2006. The Allegro con bravura was premiered by Arto Noras on February 20, 2010, in Paris and, finally, the Preludio was premiered between April 16 and 27, 2013, in Paris, at the fifth International Paulo Cello Competition.

It was published several times by Boosey & Hawkes and Schott Music to include the different expansions to the suite. However, the final version was dedicated to Arto Noras and published by Schott Music in 2014.

== Composition ==
This composition takes approximately 20 minutes to perform. The movement list is as follows:

1. Preludio
2. Serenade. Allegretto
3. Sarabande
4. Tempo di Valse
5. Allegro con bravura
6. Aria
7. Scherzo. Vivace
8. Notturno. Larghetto

Penderecki himself arranged some of the movements of this composition for viola for separate performance, among them Sarabande, which he rearranged in 2000.

== Notable recordings ==
Since the composition was completed in 1994 but subsequently expanded, recordings initially omitted several movements when they were released. Here is a list of notable partial recordings of this composition:

Solo cello	Record company	Year of recording	Format
Arto Noras	Naxos Records	2004	CD
Dariusz Skoraczewski	Analog Arts	2004	CD
