= Polish Baltic Philharmonic =

Concert hall in Gdańsk, Poland

Coordinates: 54°21′10″N 18°39′35″E

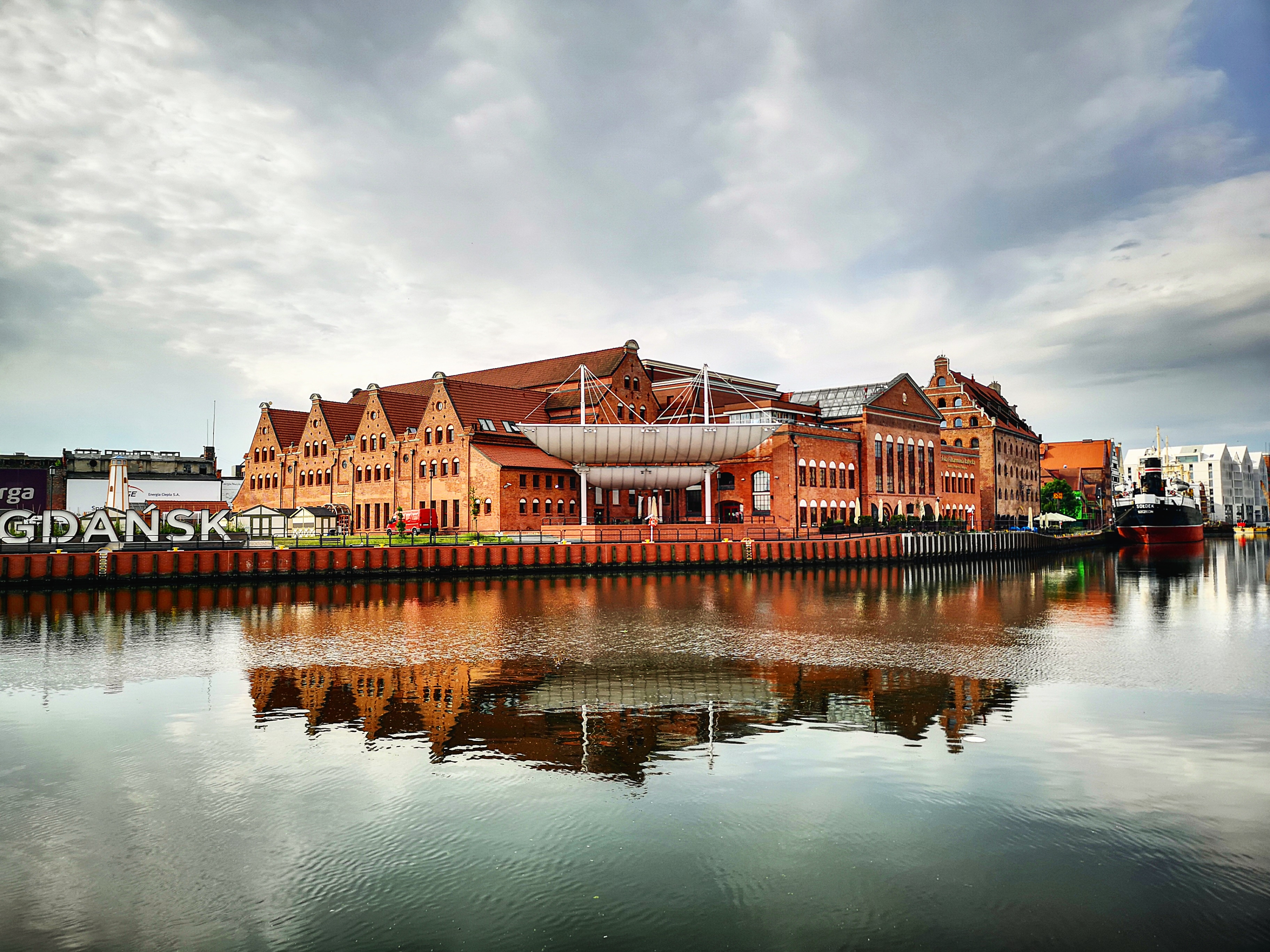
Polish Baltic Philharmonic on the Motława river

Polish Baltic F. Chopin Philharmonic in Gdańsk (full name in Polish: Polska Filharmonia Bałtycka im. Fryderyka Chopina w Gdańsku) is a concert hall located in Ołowianka, Gdańsk.

== History ==
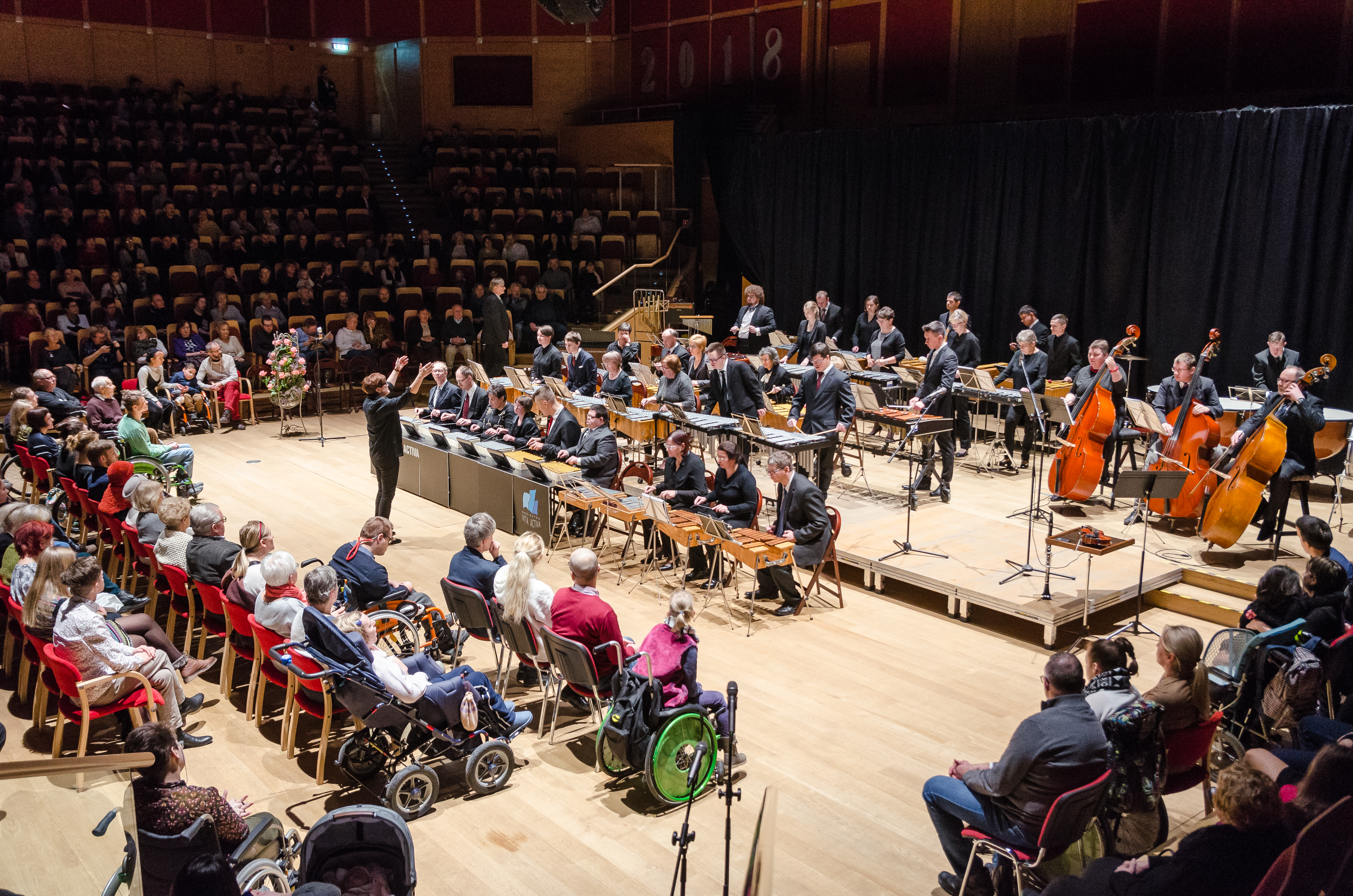
Vita Activa Orchestra

Polish Baltic F. Chopin Philharmonic was founded in 1945 as Gdańsk Symphony Orchestra. The inaugural concert took place on September 29 in Sopot. In 1949 it changed its name to Polish Baltic Philharmonic. In 1953 it was combined with opera department and changed into Polish Baltic Opera and Philharmonic (POiFB). After forming a new symphony orchestra in 1974, Baltic Philharmonic was transformed into independent Polish Baltic F. Chopin Philharmonic in 1993.

Prof. Roman Perucki, the artistic director of Polish Baltic F. Chopin Philharmonic in Gdańsk, is an organ virtuoso as well as the winner of numerous international prizes. He performs all over the world and is considered to be the founder of the International Organ Music Festival at the Oliwa Cathedral, which is Poland's oldest festival of its kind.

In September 2008, Kai Bumann became the new artistic director of the F. Chopin Baltic Philharmonic. Berlin-born, he was previously the artistic director of the Kraków Opera during the 1997/1998 season.

In 2025 the Polish Baltic Philharmonic Orchestra performed for the historic 80th anniversary season with a series of concerts. This is a direct successor to the original Polish Baltic Philharmonic Symphony Orchestra.

== Building ==
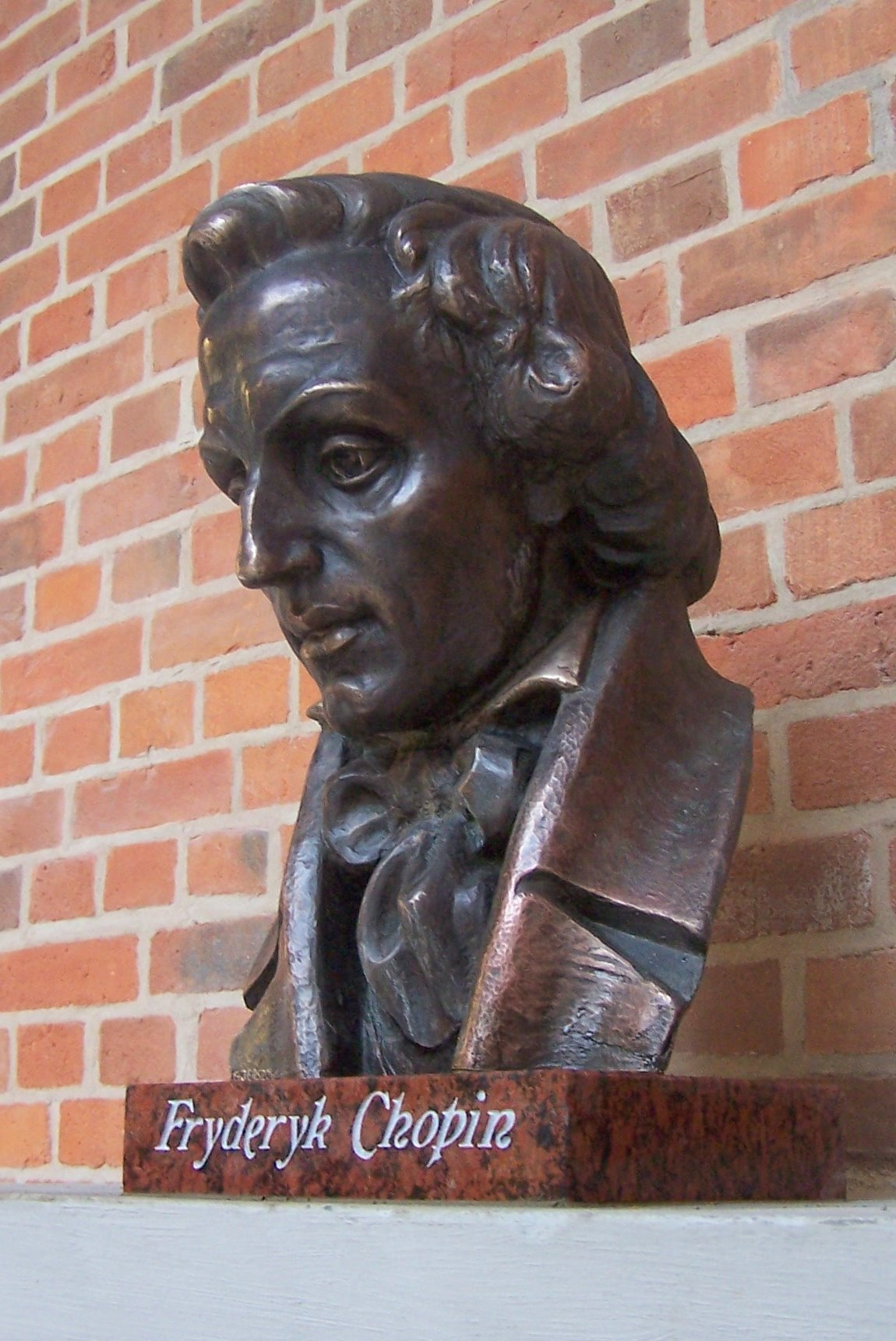
Fryderyk Chopin sculpture by Gennady Jerszow

The building, which houses the Baltic Philharmonic Hall today was constructed in 1897-1898 as a power station with a neo-Gothic façade.

The seat of the Polish Baltic Philharmonic is a complex of buildings at the former plant of the late nineteenth century, located on the island of Ołowianka in Gdańsk. After the plant was closed in 1996, it was subsequently adapted between 1996 and 2005 as a concert hall.

This urban power station was built between 1897 and 1898 by the Berlin firm of Siemens & Halske, with further expansion continuing through 1913. This brick building with its elegant neo-Gothic façade is decorated with rosettes, turrets and even two tower. During the final months of World War II, the complex suffered severe damage. Launched back in August 1945 the power plant operated until its closure in 1996. The reconstruction, development and adaptation of these buildings was done by the architectural studio of Martin Kozikowski and KD Kozikowski Design. The Baltic Philharmonic is composed of seven segments, including:

- the main concert hall of 1,000 seats
- chamber music hall for 200 seats
- two multi-purpose halls
- foyer (exhibition room, 808 sq ft)
- hotel for 60

In 2007, a bronze bust of Frédéric Chopin, the patron of the Baltic Philharmonic, by sculptor Gennady Jerszow was placed in the Philharmonic.

=== Main concert hall ===
Main concert hall has 1,000 seats. Its acoustics designed by Witold Straszewicz along with Eve Więckowska-Kosmala. It is equipped with the latest lighting and sound system, simultaneous interpretation, hearing assistance system and a system of static and dynamic projection. A specially designed movable ceiling screens and room finishes allow for easy customization of acoustics. It also operates a modern system combines fiber allowing radio and television broadcasts. The main auditorium has 1,100 seats.

The Philharmonic was the venue for the Wikimania 2010 international conference.
