= Rodolfo Faistauer =

- Born: São Leopoldo
- Origin: Brazil
- Occupation: Pianist

Rodolfo Augusto Faistauer (São Leopoldo) is a Brazilian pianist.

== Biography ==
Rodolfo Faistauer started his musical studies at the Institute of Music of São Leopoldo, his hometown. At the age of thirteen he transferred his piano studies to Porto Alegre as a student of Dirce Bauer Knijnik, a pupil of Guiomar Novaes and Carlo Zecchi. Between 2007 and 2010 he studied at the Federal University of Rio Grande do Sul in the class of Cristina Capparelli, obtaining his bachelor's degree in piano. In 2011, Rodolfo moved to Strasbourg, France, to study with pianist Amy Lin at the Académie Supérieure de Musique de Strasbourg, earning a Specialization Diploma in piano and a master's degree in Piano performance. Rodolfo has also studied at the Hochschule für Musik und Theater München, in Munich, Germany, with pianist Margarita Höhenrieder. Rodolfo has participated in the Summer Academies of Nancy, France, and of the Mozarteum in Salzburg, Austria, as well as at the International Keyboard Institute and Festival in New York City. He has had the chance to learn through lessons and master classes form pianists such as: Cristina Ortiz, Peter Frankl, Andrzej Jasinski, Jean-Philippe Collard, Christian Ivaldi, Roy Howat, Arnaldo Cohen and Alon Goldstein. Rodolfo has performed solo and chamber music in Europe and Brazil. In 2016 he performed at the Hungarian Institute in Paris, as part of a symposium dedicated to the work of Hungarian composer György Kurtág.

== Research ==
Rodolfo also works as a researcher since his undergraduate years. He received a research scholarship from the Brazilian National Council for Scientific and Technological Development (CNPq), contributing to the Group of Research in Performance Practice of the graduate program in music of the Federal University of Rio Grande do Sul. He was a co-translator of the book Liszt-Pädagogium into Portuguese, by Lina Ramann (1833–1912), a project of the Fondazione Istituto Liszt in Bologna, Italy, and organized by Italian musicologist Rossana Dalmonte. In his Master's thesis, "Artur Schnabel et l'expression de la structure", Rodolfo analyzed Schnabel's musical concepts and its origins, and tried to identify which elements were used to convey to the listener his understanding of the structure in Beethoven's Piano Sonata op. 110. Rodolfo's detailed study of Schnabel's musical tradition lead him to work as a researcher for documentaries about music in Europe, for instance, the Franco-German production Artur Schnabel: No Place of Exile for TV-channel ARTE, released in February 2018.,
