= Maria Broel-Plater =

Maria Ludwika Zyberk Broel-Plater (13 November 1845 - 1 March 1895) was a Polish composer who wrote vocal music through at least opus 12.

Little is known about Broel-Plater’s early life or education. One of six siblings, she married the bibliophile Włodzimierz Stanisław Plater.

Broel-Plater’s music was published by Gebethner and Wolff (today part of Polskie Wydawnictwo Muzyczn), and is available through the Polish National Library. Her compositions for voice include:

- Barcarolla (Italian text)
- “Duettino: Una Sera Sul Lago” Maggiore (voice and piano)
- “Ecce Panis” (two voices and organ)
- “La Notte” (Italian text)
- “Le Vallon” (voice and piano; text by Alphonse de Lamartine)
- “Mgly Poranne, opus 10” (voice and piano; text by Teofil Lenartowicz)
- “Notte di Michelangelo Buonarotti, opus 6” (voice and piano)
- “Parce Domine” (two voices)
- “Piesn z Wiezy” (voice and piano)
- “Rimembranza di Venezia” (for soprano, contralto and tenor)
- “Tantum Ergo” (four voices and organ)
- “Vieni O Bella, opus 12” (voice and piano; text by Francesco Anichini)
- “Zlituj Sie Zlituj Sie Nad Polska Kraina!” (voice and piano; text by Jan Tarwid)
