= Emanations (Penderecki) =

1958 composition for two orchestras by Krzysztof Penderecki

Emanations, also referred to by its original German title Emanationen or by its Polish title Emanacje, is a composition for two orchestras by Polish composer Krzysztof Penderecki. Composed in 1958, it is one of his early compositions.

== Composition and premiere ==
The composition was conceived and written in 1958 and won the second prize at the Polish Composers' Union Young Composers Competition, in April 1959. It would eventually be premiered on September 7, 1961, at the Darmstadt International Summer Courses for New Music. Michael Gielen conducted the Southwest German Radio Symphony Orchestra for its premiere. It was dedicated to Tadeusz Ochlewski and was published by the Polish Music Publishing House and the Moeck Musikinstrumente + Verlag.

== Analysis ==
Emanations is scored for two string orchestras that are tuned a minor second apart. It takes approximately 7 minutes to perform and features the sound-painting compositional style that became a well-known trait of his works from the 60s and 70s, until his first symphony.

== Notable recordings ==
Following are some of the most well-known recordings of this piece:

Orchestra	Conductor	Record Company	Year of Recording	Format
Polish Radio National Symphony Orchestra	Krzysztof Penderecki	EMI	1972	LP and CD
Luxembourg Philharmonic Orchestra	Alois Springer	Candide and Vox Records	1972	LP and CD
