= Emanation =

Emanation may refer to:

- Emanation, a dated name for the chemical element Radon
- Rod (Slavic religion), the Emanation from Below, a concept in Slavic religion
- Emanation in the Eastern Orthodox Church, a belief found in Neoplatonism
- Emanation of the state, a legal term for a public service body
- Emanationism, an idea in the cosmology or cosmogony of certain religious or philosophical systems
- "Emanations" (Star Trek: Voyager), a 1995 episode of Star Trek: Voyager
- Emanations (Penderecki), a 1958 composition by Krzysztof Penderecki
- "Emanation", a song by Immanuel Wilkins from The 7th Hand
- "Emanations", a song by Univers Zero from Uzed

== See also ==
- Aeon (Gnosticism)
- Emanate, a 1999 album by Penumbra
