= Evangelical Reformed Parish, Warsaw =

Evangelical Reformed Parish in Warsaw Parafia Ewangelicko-Reformowana w Warszawie (in Polish)
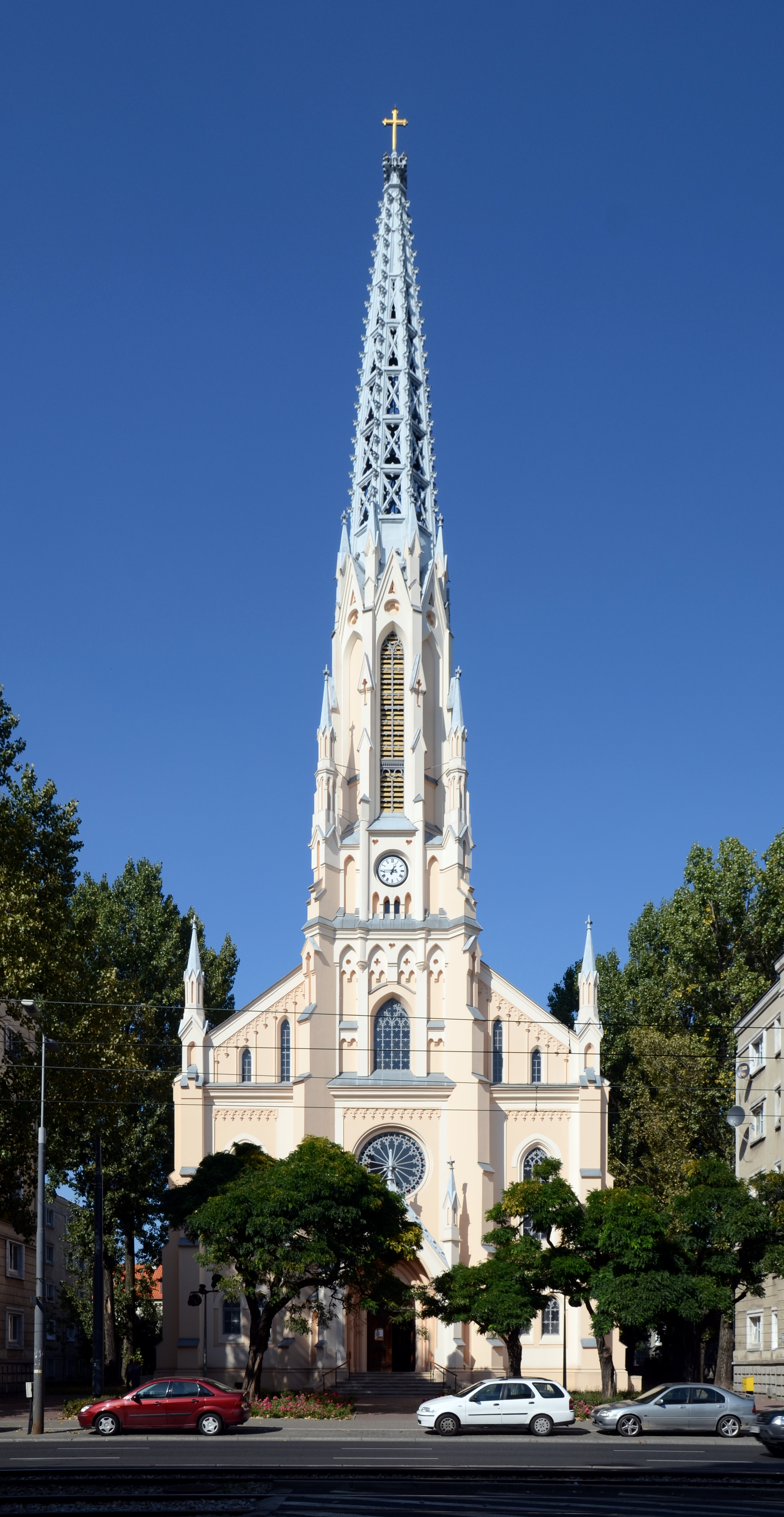
- The church of the Evangelical Reformed Parish in Warsaw.
- Evangelical Reformed Parish in Warsaw; Parafia Ewangelicko-Reformowana w Warszawie (in Polish)
- 52.2440°N 20.9983°E
- Location: Warsaw
- Country: Poland
- Denomination: Polish Reformed Church
- Website: http://reformowani.org.pl/

Architecture
- Architect: Adolf Loewe
- Style: Gothic
- Groundbreaking: 1866-10-30
- Completed: 1880-10-24

Clergy
- Pastor: Michał Jabłoński

Evangelical Reformed Parish in Warsaw (Polish: in full, Parafia Ewangelicko-Reformowana w Warszawie) is a Polish Reformed church in Warsaw at Aleja Solidarności 76a.

== Assumption parish ==
The parish was registered in Leszno in 1776, when a decree from 1525, banning dissenters settling in Mazovia, was withdrawn. A year later, the first Reformed church (now the headquarters of the Warsaw Chamber Opera) and the rectory was built and designed by Szymon Bogumił Zug.

On October 30, 1866, the construction began of a new church in the Gothic style, designed by architect Adolf Loewe. Construction lasted 14 years and on October 24, 1880, the church was dedicated. A high tower with a shawl helmet is modelled on the tower of The Cathedral of Our Lady in Freiburg im Breisgau. Among the elements that draw attention are the oak pulpit made and designed by Konstanty Wojciechowski (pl).

In 1881 the parish founded in the Działyński Palace included a hospital, an elementary school, a home for orphans, and a nursing home.

== 1918-1939 ==
After regaining independence, parish life began to evolve rapidly. This resulted in a Youth Association, a Mission Inner Circle and a Ladies Auxiliary and they conducted Sunday school classes. Trips outside the city were organised as well as camps for children in property donated to the church.

In this time there were two parish magazines. Between 1924 and 1928 "Żagiew Chrystusowa” (The Torch of Christ), and from 1926 to 1939 "Jednota” ("Unity").

== The occupation ==
In 1940 the buildings of the parish including the church, Działyński Palace, the hospital and several other buildings in the so-called "Evangelical enclave" near the Warsaw ghetto area were destroyed during the defence of Warsaw in September 1939. Parishioners and clergy helped save Jews from the ghetto, which is commemorated by one of the monuments on the boundaries of the ghetto, located behind the parish.

During the occupation, many parishioners were killed, and several priests murdered. Evangelicals also took part in the Warsaw Uprising.

== After the war ==
The first church services were held in the Methodist chapel in Savior Square. Renovations started on the church on Aleja Solidarności. It served Warsaw's Lutherans, whose church burned down in 1939. In 1958, the parish rectory was restored (the original Zug designed church), where its headquarters were, and in 1957 the editors reactivated the "Unity" magazine. The Polish Ecumenical Council was based there from 1960 to 1974.

== The parish cemetery ==
The cemetery was established in 1792 and is located in the Wola district. Many historic gravestones are in need of renovation, so money is collected by the Social Committee for the Protection of Monuments at the Evangelical Reformed Cemetery.

== Today ==
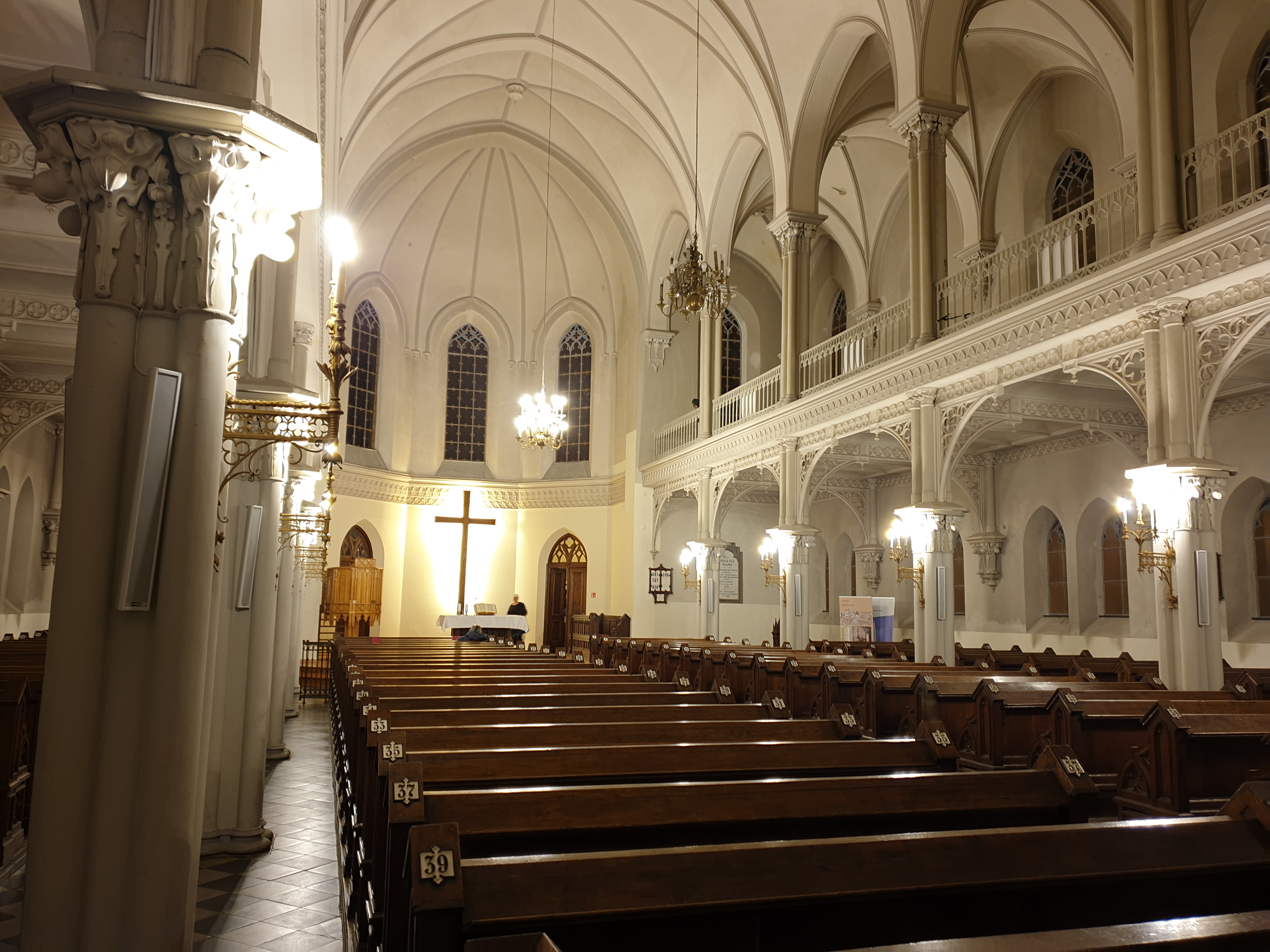
Inside the church

The current pastor is Michał Jabłoński.

A parish administrator is elected for three years by the College Church. Among its members is the pastor who is elected for a ten-year term. The college and pastor of the church chooses the General Assembly. It teaches religion to children and adolescents: at Sunday school, during lessons before confirmation, and during the two-year course youth participate in after confirmation. The parish ministry also caters to foreign nationals of Chinese and Vietnamese nationalities.

The parish operates the Chamber Choir of the Reformed Evangelical Church in Warsaw, which since 1991, has held concerts at the church and at churches of other denominations, and taken part in competitions abroad (including in the Czech Republic, Finland, Germany, Romania, Slovakia, and Switzerland).

They also have the Concerto Polacco orchestra and the Sine Nomine choir, performing classical musical works.

== Clergy from the parish in Warsaw ==
27 priests have worked there, including:

- Władysław Semadeni (1865–1930)
- Stefan Skierski (1873–1948)
- Edward Wende (1874–1949)
- Kazimierz Ostachiewicz (1883–1952)
- Wladyslaw Paschalis (1892–1996)
- Roman Mazierski (1899-1959)
- Emil Jelinek (1905–1979)
- Jan Niewieczerzał (1914–1981)
- Zdzisław Tranda (born 1925)
- Zdzisław Grzybek (1926–1996)
- Bogdan Tranda (1929–1996)
- Jerzy Stahl (1939–1997)
- Miroslaw Danys (born 1945)
- Lech Tranda (1956–2012)
- Piet van Veldhuisen (born 1959)
- Tadeusz Jelinek (born 1966)
- Michał Jabłoński (born 1967)
