= Warsaw Chamber Opera =

Opera house in Warsaw, Poland

Coordinates: 52°14′38″N 20°59′51″E

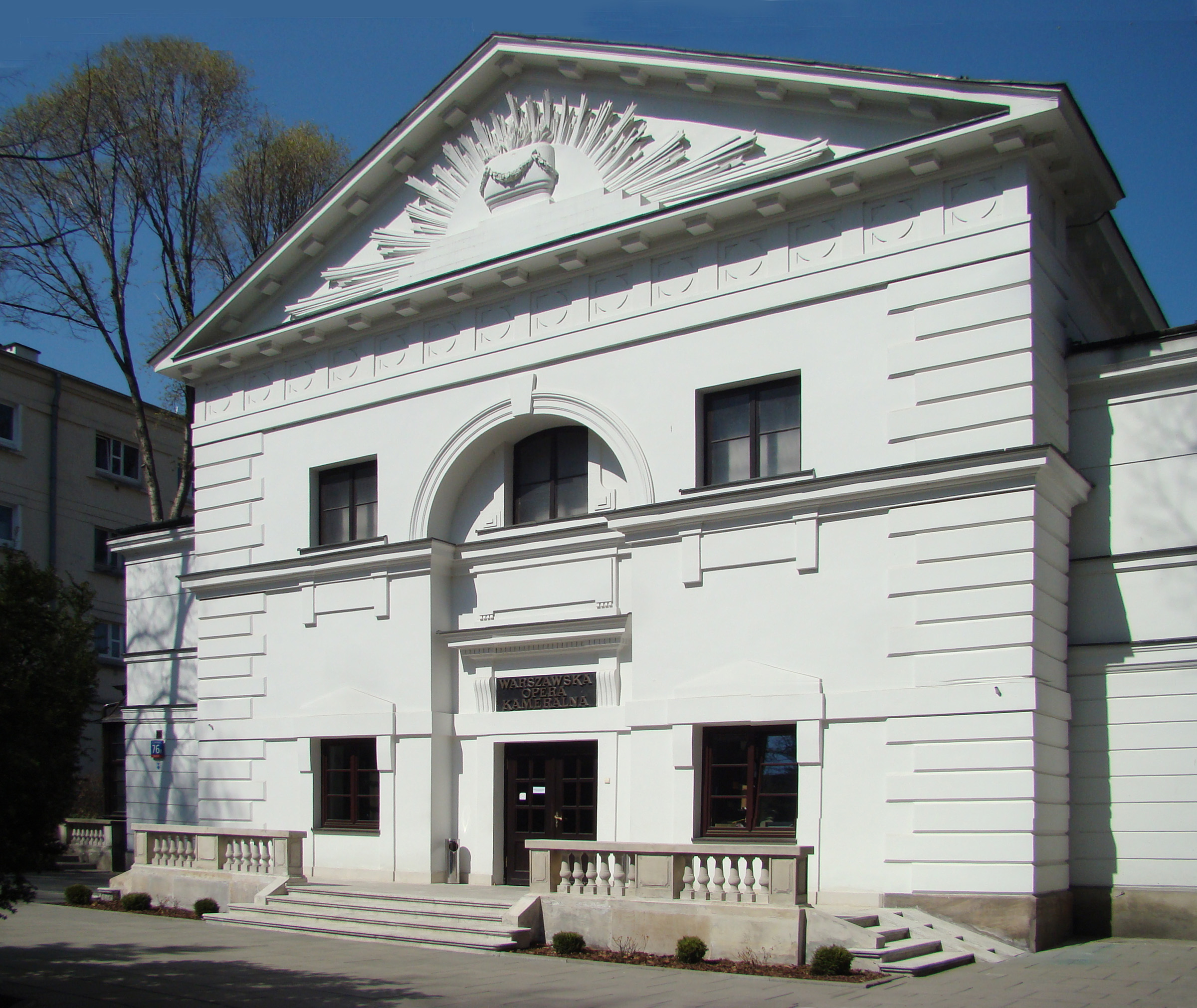
Theatre of the Warsaw Chamber Opera, built in 1777 as first Calvinist chapel in Warsaw.

The Warsaw Chamber Opera (Polish: Warszawska Opera Kameralna, WOK) is a Polish opera company founded in 1961 by Stefan Sutkowski, its managing and artistic director from its inception until his retirement in 2012.

On 15 October 1986, the Warsaw Chamber Opera moved into its own theater at Al. Solidarności 76B. The historic building, built in 1777, was formerly used by the Student Theatre Satirical STS (Polish: Studenckiego Teatru Satyryków STS), and before that it was built as the first church in Warsaw of the Polish Reformed Church. The theater building has been entered into the register of monuments of the city of Warsaw.

The repertoire of the Warsaw Chamber Opera presents many diverse musical styles and forms of works: from medieval mystery plays to the operas of the early and late Baroque opera, classic eighteenth-century pantomime, opera by Rossini, Donizetti, as well as works by contemporary composers.

Warsaw Chamber Opera is known for its Mozart Festival, organized every year since 1991. Its repertoire includes all stage works of Wolfgang Amadeus Mozart. It also organizes a festival for Gioacchino Rossini and Claudio Monteverdi and the Festival of Old Polish Opera.

Although specializing in music of the past, they perform Polish contemporary works as well.
