= Mikolaj Wysocki =

Polish theologian

Mikołaj Wysocki (1595–1650) was a Polish Evangelical theologian of the Evangelical Reformed Church of Polish–Lithuanian Commonwealth.

He entered the gymnasium in Gdańsk, then he studied in Germany Heidelberg at the University of Heidelberg. After his return to Poland he was the Evangelical preacher in Siedlce, later he was the senior of the district Podlaskie.

He gave an Agenda: Akt usługi chrztu świętego i świętej Wieczerzy Pańskiej, także akt dawania ślubu małżeńskiego (in English that means: services Act of holy baptism and holy Lord, the act of giving wedding marriage)
