= De Natura Sonoris =

De natura sonoris (On the nature of sound) is the title of three works by the Polish composer Krzysztof Penderecki.

De natura sonoris no. 1 (the number was appended later) was composed in 1966. The title was inspired by Lucretius's De rerum natura (On the nature of things). As the title suggests, it is a vigorous exploration of wildly divergent orchestral effects and dynamics. It was premiered on 7 April 1966 at the International Festival of Contemporary Art in the French town of Royan.

De natura sonoris no. 2 was composed five years later to a commission by the Juilliard School of Music in New York. Penderecki again took up the theme of vividly contrasting orchestral colouration, including unusual percussive effects: an iron bar is struck by implements such as a hammer and a saw. It was premiered on 3 December 1971 at Juilliard under the conductor Jorge Mester.

Both pieces are approximately eight minutes in length each, with De natura sonoris no. 2 being the longer of the two. In 1975 the composer recorded both works with the Polish Radio National Symphony Orchestra for EMI. Both of these pieces featured in the Stanley Kubrick film The Shining.

In 2012, Penderecki composed De natura sonoris no. 3.
