= Lacrimosa No. 2 =

2018 composition by Krzysztof Penderecki

- by Krzysztof Penderecki
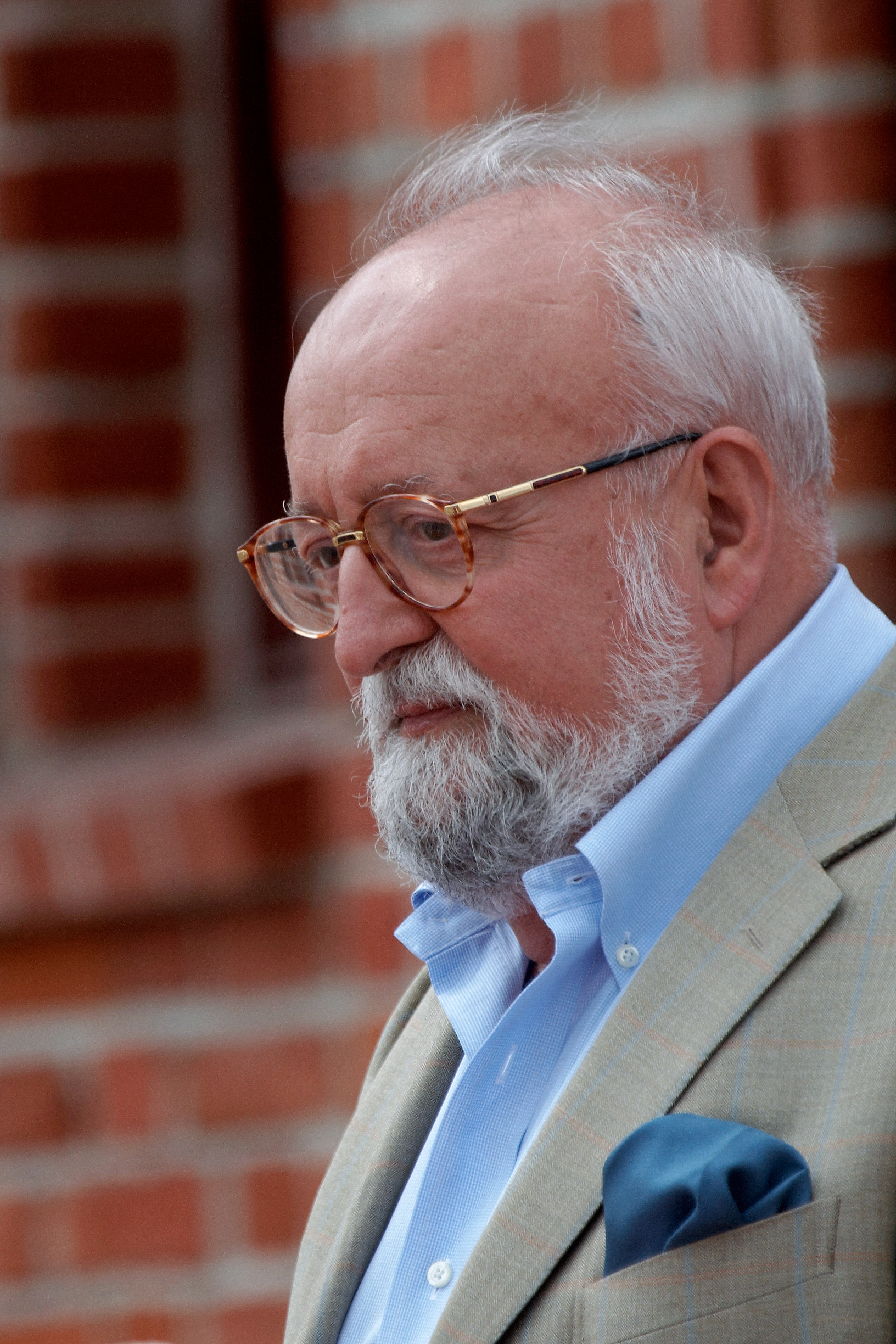
- The composer in 2008
- Text: Lacrimosa, from the Requiem mass
- Language: Latin
- Composed: 2018
- Performed: 6 October 2018

Lacrimosa No. 2 is a sacred composition for soprano, women's choir and chamber orchestra by Krzysztof Penderecki, completed in 2018, setting the liturgical text Lacrimosa from the Requiem mass.

== History ==
Penderecki wrote Lacrimosa No. 2 on a commission by the Pomeranian Philharmonic. He set the liturgical text Lacrimosa from the Requiem mass which he had set first in his Polish Requiem, for a soprano soloist, women's choir and chamber orchestra. The world premiere was performed on 10 October 2018, on the occasion of the unveiling of the Monument to the Victims of the Pomeranian Crime of 1939 in Toruń, Poland, by soprano Iwona Hossa, the Chór Żeński Uniwersytetu Technologiczno-Przyrodniczego, and the Pomeranian Philharmonic, conducted by Kai Bumann.. It was published by Schott. The duration is given as two minutes.
