= Symphony No. 1 (Penderecki) =

Symphony by Krzysztof Penderecki

- by Krzysztof Penderecki
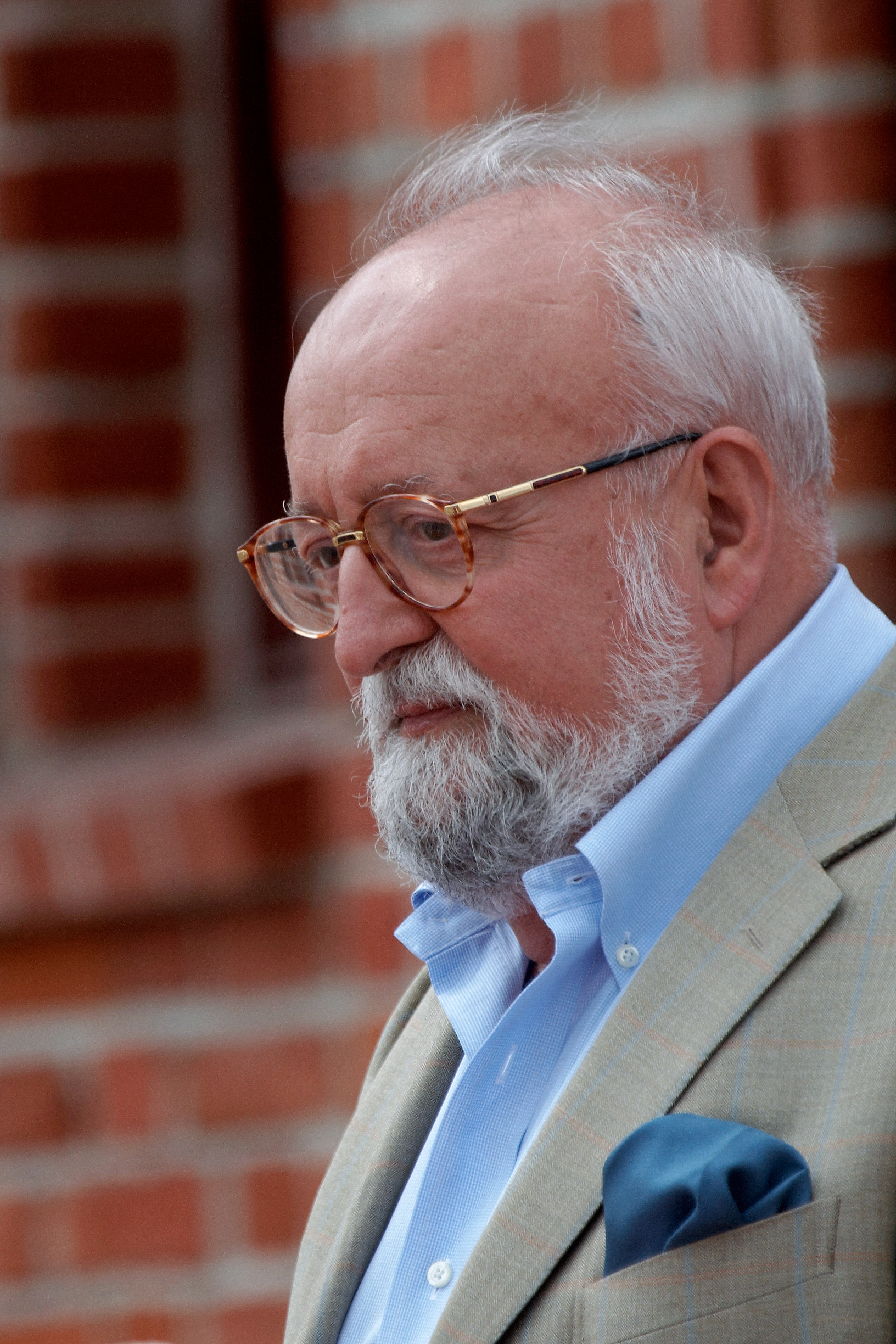
- The composer in 2008
- Composed: 1973
- Performed: 19 July 1973, Peterborough Cathedral
- Movements: 4
- Scoring: orchestra

The Symphony No. 1 by Polish composer Krzysztof Penderecki was composed in 1973. It was published by Polish Music Publishing House and Schott Music and has never been expanded or revised.

== Composition ==
The composition was commissioned by Perkins Engines, one of the best known gas engine manufacturers in Peterborough, as part of a series of Annual Industrial Concerts. Penderecki started composing it in 1972. It would eventually premiere at Peterborough Cathedral on 19 July 1973, with the composer conducting the London Symphony Orchestra. Three months after its world premiere, it was performed in the composer's own country, at the Warsaw Autumn Festival by the Warsaw Philharmonic Orchestra under Witold Rowicki.

By the time the composition was finished, Penderecki stated that "I was then attempting to make a reckoning of my two decades' worth of musical experience – a time of radical, avant-garde seeking. It was the summa of what I could say as an avant-garde artist", claiming that the compositional style that he had been developing over the previous 15 years had reached its natural conclusion.

== Structure ==
The symphony consists of four continuous movements, which take approximately 30 to 35 minutes to perform.

1. Archi 1
2. Dynamis 1
3. Dynamis 2
4. Archi 2

This composition is scored for a large orchestra, consisting of the following instruments.

Woodwinds

3 flutes (2nd and 3rd doubling piccolo)
3 oboes (3rd doubling English horn)
3 clarinets
1 bass clarinet
3 bassoons (3rd doubling contrabassoon)

Brass

5 horns
3 trumpets
4 trombones
1 tuba

Percussion (5 players)

timpani

2 triangles
1 gong
4 cymbals
2 tam-tams
6 tom-toms
2 bongos
2 congas
wooden drum
bass drum
woodblock
claves
ratchet
guiro
whip
vibraslap
5 crotales
iron bar
5 bells
5 Almglocken

Keyboards

glockenspiel
harmonium
celesta
piano

Strings

harp

violins I
violins II
violas
cellos
double basses
