= Aria, Ciaccona & Vivace =

Watch This

Aria, Ciaccona & Vivace is a 2019 composition by Krzysztof Penderecki, which was compiled and adapted for piano by Venezuelan-German composer Sef Albertz. This work represents the only solo piano music in the catalog of the renowned Polish composer. It was one of the last works of Penderecki, composed before his death, just over a year after its premiere in March 2019.

== Composition and premiere ==
Aria, Ciaccona & Vivace takes approximately 15 minutes to perform. The single pieces were originally written for orchestra and in the piano version they are placed in a new dramaturgical context.

- Aria is originally part of Three pieces in old style
- Ciaccona is originally part of Polish Requiem
- Vivace is originally part of Sinfonietta N° 1

German pianist Anna-Maria Maak gave the world premiere performance on March 22, 2019, during the ‘Town Hall Concert Serie’ (Rathauskonzerte) in Torgau (Germany). It represented the last world premiere in the lifetime of the renowned composer.

== Reception ==
On March 26, 2019, Georg Frackowiak, music critic of the newspaper Torgauer Zeitung wrote about the premiere of the work: "Composition, arrangement and performance were equally convincing, with the pianistic ability of the interpreter arousing total admiration...".

About the new composition, Maak said: "It’s a wonderful piano music, pianistically adapted in a very appropriate way. Making Penderecki's exciting musical language accessible to pianists is a real asset!".

== Discography ==
Pianist Anna-Maria Maak has also performed the world premiere recording of Aria, Ciaccona & Vivace, which can be found on her 2021 album In the Secret of the World alongside world premieres of original compositions by Sef Albertz.
