= Alon Goldstein =

Israeli musician

Alon Goldstein (Hebrew: אלון גולדשטיין; born 1970) is an Israeli classical pianist.
