= CRD Records =

English record label

- Status: Active
- Genre: Classical music
- Country of origin: UK

CRD (Continental Record Distribution) is an English record label specialising in recordings of classical music, based in Truro.

It was founded in 1965 by Graham Pauncefort as an importer and distributor of specialised European and the American recordings, and in 1973 become a recording label in its own right. The distribution activity was split from the recording in 1974, and was taken over by an investment company in 1978. The artistic director from 1973 until his death in 1986 was Simon Lawman, a graduate of the Royal Academy of Music.

CRD continues to record a wide variety of repertoire and musicians in the field of classical music.
