= Tonhalle St. Gallen =

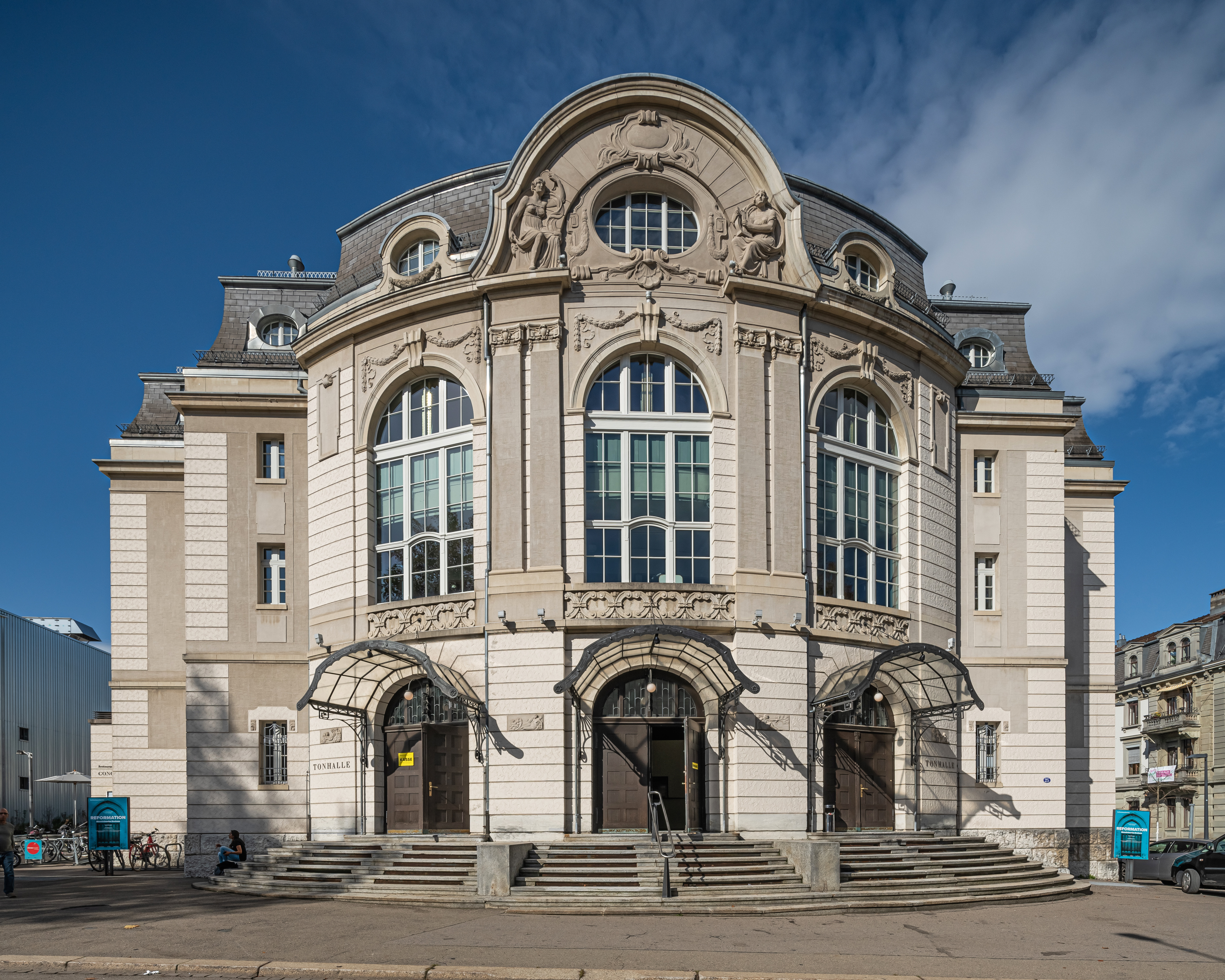
- The front of the concert hall

General information
- Architectural style: Art Nouveau
- Address: Museumstrasse 25
- Town or city: St. Gallen
- Country: Switzerland
- Coordinates: 47°25′40″N 9°22′47″E
- Completed: 1909

Website
- http://www.st.gallen.ch/tonhalle/

Tonhalle St. Gallen is a concert hall in St. Gallen, Switzerland. It is a cultural centre, a venue for concerts, banquets and meetings. It is the home of the St. Gallen Symphony Orchestra.

== History ==
The concert hall was built between 1906 and 1909, in Art Nouveau style. The innovative construction used a reinforced concrete frame designed by Robert Maillart.

Early concerts were given by guest orchestras, with conductors Artur Nikisch, Richard Strauss, Felix Weingartner and Arturo Toscanini. Othmar Schoeck was the conductor of symphony concerts from 1917 to 1944.

The building was renovated in the early 1990s, with a larger stage and improved facilities for conductor and artists, and reopened in May 1993.
