= Arto Noras =

Finnish cellist (born 1942)

- Born: 12 May 1942 (age 83)
- Occupation: cellist

Arto Noras (born 12 May 1942, in Turku) is a Finnish cellist who is one of Finland's most celebrated instrumentalists and amongst the most outstanding internationally acknowledged cellists of his generation.

At the age of 8, Arto Noras started his studies at the prestigious Sibelius Academy in Helsinki, Finland. After completing his studies with Professor Yrjö Selin at the Sibelius Academy, Arto Noras studied with Paul Tortelier at the Paris Conservatoire where he gained the coveted Premier Prix diploma in 1964. Two years later, in 1966, he was awarded second prize in the International Tchaikovsky Competition in Moscow, which immediately opened his way to the most important concert halls in Europe and both North and South America where he has performed regularly ever since. Arto Noras also won the Danish Sonning Prize in 1967 and Finnish State music prize in 1972.

Arto Noras' repertoire covers all the principal works that have been written for his instrument, including those by contemporary composers, and he has recorded them extensively for the Finlandia recording label. In 1970 Arto Noras was appointed Professor of Cello at the Sibelius Academy in Helsinki. Noras has served as a jurist for some of the most important music competitions in the world, including the Tchaikovsky, Casals and Cassado competitions. He can be heard as a most distinguished chamber musician as a member of the Helsinki Trio and as a founder member of the Sibelius Academy Quartet as well as with several other groups of similarly distinguished musicians.

In 1980, Prof. Noras founded the Naantali Music Festival in Naantali, Finland, and as of 2013 he is still the Artistic Manager of the festival. He also founded in 1991 and remains the Artistic Director of the V Paulo International Cello Competition, whose former winners include internationally renowned French concert cellist Jean-Guihen Queyras and Perttu Kivilaakso, member of the popular cello rock band Apocalyptica.

== Teaching chair ==
| Preceded by Yrjö Selin | Professor of cello studies, Sibelius Academy; 1970- | Succeeded by |
