= Michel Lethiec =

French classical clarinetist

Michel Lethiec is a French classical clarinetist.

Michel Lethiec has played with the Sinfonia Finlandia, the St. Petersburg Philharmonic, the English Chamber Orchestra, the Orchestre national du Capitole de Toulouse, the Salzburg Mozarteum, the Prague Radio Orchestra, and the Philharmonique de Radio France. He has premiered works by several composers, including Krzysztof Penderecki and John Corigliano. He has been teaching music at the Paris Conservatory until 2016. He is also artistic director of the Pablo Casals Festival.

== Discography ==
- Larsson: 12 Concertinos, Op 45, 1991
- Kurtag - Ligeti - Pesson, 1997
- Mozart Clarinet Quintet', 1999
- Krzysztof PENDERECKI: Concertos pour clarinette, 2000
- Jean-Baptiste Vanhal: Concertos for clarinet, oboe and bassoon, 2003
- Theodore Gouvy: Septet, Ottetto and Petite Suite Gauloise, 2004 (conducting Les Solistes de Prades and recorded by K617)
- Penderecki: Sextet, Clarinet Quartet, 2003
- Eternal Penderecki, 2008
- Gershwin, G.: Clarinet and Strings Music, 2009
