= PWM Edition =

Polish music publishing house

The PWM Edition (Polish: Polskie Wydawnictwo Muzyczne, abbreviated as PWM) is a music publishing house based in Kraków, Poland. It was founded in 1945 and was the only music publisher in Poland for several years. In 2012 it released the twelfth volume of Encyclopedia of Music, edited by Elżbieta Dziębowska.

The PWM Edition publishes the complete works of Frédéric Chopin (Chopin National Edition), Mieczysław Karłowicz, Stanisław Moniuszko and Karol Szymanowski. The publisher also sells works by Grażyna Bacewicz, Tadeusz Baird, Maria Broel-Plater, Ignacy Feliks Dobrzyński, Józef Elsner, Wojciech Kilar, Ignacy Jan Paderewski and Kazimierz Serocki in addition to traditional Polish music. It also publishes books, audiobooks, music guides and lexicons.

The publisher's hire library in Warsaw lends items for performances and recordings to choirs, ensembles, orchestras and theatres.
