= Lee Unkrich =

American filmmaker (born 1967)

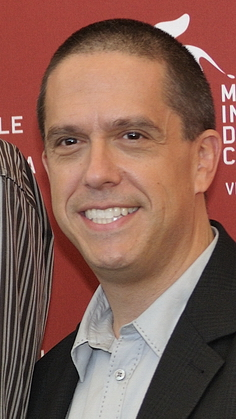
- Unkrich at the 2009 Venice Film Festival
- Born: Lee Edward Unkrich; August 8, 1967 (age 59); Cleveland, Ohio, U.S.
- Education: University of Southern California
- Occupations: Film editor; director; writer
- Years active: 1985–present
- Employer: Pixar Animation Studios (1994–2019, 2023-Present)
- Notable work: Toy Story (1995, film editor); A Bug's Life (1998, supervising film editor); Toy Story 2 (1999, co-director and film editor); Monsters, Inc. (2001, co-director); Finding Nemo (2003, co-director and supervising film editor); Toy Story 3 (2010, director); Coco (2017, director)
- Spouse: Laura Century (m. 1993)
- Children: 3
- Awards: Academy Award for Best Animated Feature; Toy Story 3 (2010); Coco (2017)

Lee Edward Unkrich (born August 8, 1967) is an American film director, editor and writer. He is best known for his work with animation studio Pixar, which he joined in 1994 as an editor before being credited as a co-director on Toy Story 2 (1999).

Following the film's success, Unkrich served a similar role for the films Monsters, Inc. (2001) and Finding Nemo (2003) before making his solo directorial debut with Toy Story 3 (2010). The film, along with the second of which he directed, Coco (2017), both won two Academy Awards: Best Animated Feature and Best Original Song.

After his 25-year tenure at the company, Unkrich retired in January 2019 to spend more time with his family and pursue other interests. However, he returned to the studio a few years later and is currently directing a sequel to Coco.

== Early life and career ==
Unkrich was raised in Chagrin Falls, Ohio, the only child of Emilie Unkrich and Robert Unkrich. His father was a World War II veteran and artist. Unkrich was raised in the Jewish faith. He spent his youth acting at The Cleveland Play House. Unkrich graduated from the University of Southern California School of Cinematic Arts in 1990.

Unkrich was Vice-President of Editorial and Layout at Pixar. Before joining the studio, Unkrich worked for several years in television as an editor and director. In 1994 he was hired by Pixar as a short-term employee for a period of four weeks, but ended up staying for 25 years. He is the 2011 recipient of the University of Southern California's Mary Pickford Distinguished Alumni Award recognizing alumni contributions to the cinematic arts.

On January 18, 2019, Unkrich announced he was leaving Pixar to spend time with his family and pursue interests that have "long been back-burnered." In 2023, Unkrich was revealed to have occasionally consulted at Pixar since leaving in 2019.

In late 2022 he announced he had completed editing a book about The Shining, written by J. W. Rinzler. In 2023, Taschen released Unkrich's book Stanley Kubrick's The Shining in a limited collector's edition. A hardcover version of the book was released in 2024. The book was edited by Unkrich, and written by J. W. Rinzler and Unkrich.

In March 2025, during the Disney Shareholder Meeting, CEO Bob Iger announced that the sequel to Coco was in early development, with Unkrich returning to co-direct the film with Adrian Molina.

== Personal life ==
Unkrich is married to Laura Century and they have three children. Unkrich came out as bisexual to his family and friends in 2021 and came out publicly in 2022.

== Filmography ==
=== Films ===
Year	Title	Director	(Original) Story by	Film Editor	Executive Producer	Other	Voice Role	Notes
1995	Toy Story	No	No	Yes	No	No		
1998	A Bug's Life	No	No	Supervising	No	Yes	Additional Voices	
1999	Toy Story 2	Co-Director	No	Yes	No	Yes	Red Rocker	Additional Story Material
2001	Monsters, Inc.	Co-Director	No	Additional	No	Yes	Additional Voices	
2003	Finding Nemo	Co-Director	No	Supervising	No	Yes	Additional Voices	
2004	The Incredibles	No	No	No	No	No		Brain Trust - uncredited
2006	Cars	No	No	Additional	No	No		Brain Trust - uncredited
2007	Ratatouille	No	No	No	No	No		Brain Trust - uncredited
2008	WALL-E	No	No	No	No	Yes		Pixar Senior Creative Team
2009	Up	No	No	No	No	Yes		Pixar Senior Creative Team
2010	Toy Story 3	Yes	Yes	Yes	No	Yes	Jack-In-The-Box / Scotch-Taped Monkey	Additional Screenplay Material; Pixar Senior Creative Team
2011	Cars 2	No	No	No	No	Yes		Pixar Senior Creative Team
2012	Brave	No	No	No	No	Yes		Pixar Senior Creative Team
2013	Monsters University	No	No	No	Yes	Yes		Pixar Senior Creative Team
2015	Inside Out	No	No	No	No	Yes		Pixar Senior Creative Team
2015	The Good Dinosaur	No	No	No	Yes	Yes		Pixar Senior Creative Team
2016	Finding Dory	No	No	No	No	Yes		Pixar Senior Creative Team
2017	Cars 3	No	No	No	No	Yes		Pixar Senior Creative Team
2017	Coco	Yes	Yes	Yes	No	Yes	Elote Skeleton	Pixar Senior Creative Team
2018	Incredibles 2	No	No	No	No	Yes		Pixar Senior Creative Team
2019	Toy Story 4	No	No	Additional	Yes	Yes		Pixar Senior Creative Team
2020	Onward	No	No	Additional	No	Yes		Pixar Senior Creative Team
2020	Soul	No	No	No	No	Yes		Special Thanks
2021	Luca	No	No	No	No	Yes		Pixar Senior Creative Team
2022	Turning Red	No	No	No	No	Yes		Pixar Senior Creative Team
2022	Lightyear	No	No	No	No	Yes		Pixar Senior Creative Team
2023	Elemental	No	No	No	No	Yes		Pixar Senior Creative Team
2029	Coco 2	Yes	TBA	TBA	No	Yes		Pixar Senior Creative Team

=== Television ===
- Prison Stories: Women on the Inside (1991) (TV) (production assistant)
- Silk Stalkings (1991) (TV Series) (assistant editor, editor, director)
- Renegade (1993) (TV series) (assistant editor)
- Betrayed by Love (1994) (TV) (assistant editor)
- Separated by Murder (1995) (TV) (editor)

==== Documentaries ====
Year	Title	Role
2007	The Pixar Story	Himself
2022	Beyond Infinity: Buzz and the Journey to 'Lightyear'	Himself

==== Shorts and TV specials ====
Year	Title	Role
2000	For the Birds	Thanks
2002	Mike's New Car	Special Thanks
2008	Presto	Special Thanks
2011	Toy Story Toons: Hawaiian Vacation	Special Thanks
2013	The Blue Umbrella	Special Thanks
2013	Toy Story of Terror!	Extra Special Thanks
2014	Toy Story That Time Forgot	Extra Special Thanks
2014	Lava	Special Thanks
2015	Sanjay's Super Team	Special Thanks
2016	Piper	Special Thanks
2018	La Noria	Special Thanks
2019	Float	Special Thanks
2020	Loop	Story Trust
2021	Pixar Popcorn: A Day in the Life of the Dead	Special Thanks
2022	Cars on the Road	Pixar Senior Creative Team
2025	Win or Lose	Pixar Senior Creative Team
