= Rinzler =

Rinzler may refer to:

- J. W. Rinzler (1962-2021), film historian
- Ralph Rinzler (1934–1994), mandolin player and folksinger
- Rinzler (Tron), character in the Tron film series
