= Stanley Kubrick's The Shining =

2023 non-fiction book

- Author: J. W. Rinzler and Lee Unkrich
- Cover artist: M/M Paris (Designer)
- Language: English
- Subjects: Stanley Kubrick, The Shining, filmmaking, film history
- Genre: Essay on film history
- Publisher: Taschen
- Publication date: March 17, 2023
- Publication place: United States
- Media type: Print (hardcover)
- Pages: 1396 pages
- ISBN: 978-3754400036

Stanley Kubrick's The Shining is a non-fiction book published in 2023 by filmmaker Lee Unkrich and film historian J. W. Rinzler. The book is a comprehensive two-volume compendium chronicling the making of Stanley Kubrick’s 1980 horror film The Shining. With a foreword by Steven Spielberg, the work is one of the most definitive resources on the film’s production.

== Overview ==
The book offers an in-depth exploration of the creation of The Shining from pre-production, production and to post-production. it includes rare photographs, original production documents, annotated scripts, storyboards and personal correspondence.

The book covers:

- Stanley Kubrick's process in adapting Stephen King's novel The Shining
- Detailed accounts of casting, rehearsals and on-set experiences
- Technical innovations in cinematography and special effects
- Anecdotes and insights from cast, crew and Kubrick's collaborators
- Examination of the film's critical and cultural reception

== Background ==
The project was conceived and edited by Lee Unkrich, a longtime enthusiast of The Shining and Pixar filmmaker, and J. W. Rinzler, a film historian known for his exhaustive making-of books on classic films like those of the Star Wars and Indiana Jones franchises. Their work was supported by extensive research and access to the Stanley Kubrick archives, allowing them to uncover many behind-the-scenes material.

== Reception ==
Stanley Kubrick's The Shining was praised as one of the most exhaustive accounts of the making of the film.
