= Le Divorce (novel) =

1997 novel by Diane Johnson

- First edition cover
- Author: Diane Johnson
- Language: English
- Genre: Comedy of manners
- Publisher: Dutton Adult
- Publication date: 1997
- Publication place: United States
- Media type: Print (hardcover, paperback)
- Pages: 320
- ISBN: 978-0-525-94238-2

Le Divorce is a 1997 novel by American author Diane Johnson. In 2003, it was adapted into a film of the same name starring Kate Hudson and Naomi Watts. The novel is a comedy of manners detailing the relationship between the American Walker family and the French Persands and how the two families cope when they learn that there is to be a divorce in the family.

== Plot ==
Isabel Walker is a twenty-something American film-school dropout who decides to visit her step-sister Roxanne, a poet who now lives in France. Isabel believes that she is there to help with Roxanne's toddler during her pregnancy, but later realizes that her father and step-mother sent her there so that Roxanne would help the shiftless Isabel gain some direction in life.

Shortly after she arrives, Roxanne confides in Isabel that her French husband, Charles-Henri has left her. Roxanne's mother-in-law, Suzanne, tells Roxanne that her husband is probably having an affair because of her pregnancy and will return to her shortly after. Roxanne struggles to decide what to do and finally decides to divorce Charles-Henri after learning he is having an affair with a woman named Magda Tellman. Roxanne becomes depressed by the end of her marriage and tries to commit suicide. She is found by Isabel, who successfully has her briefly hospitalized and only tells Charles-Henri about what happened. Charles-Henri is sympathetic but tells Roxanne he still wants a divorce.

After some acrimony the couple decide to settle for an equal divorce where their assets will be divided in half. To her surprise Roxanne learns that a painting of Saint Ursula that was gifted her from the Walker side of the family might be worth several thousand dollars.

In the meantime, Isabel begins an affair with Edgar, a septuagenarian who is Claude-Henri's uncle, after he gives her a Kelly bag and proposes she becomes his mistress. Isabel is attracted to his power and affluence and eventually believes she loves him.

Eventually the Walker family realizes that the Saint Ursula painting is probably worth quite a bit of money and start to sue the family so that the sale can be blocked. They arrive in Paris to block the sale of the painting where they are introduced to Suzanne who tells them of Isabel's affair with Edgar, something Isabel's family find hilarious. Edgar quickly ends his relationship with Isabel shortly after.

As the Walkers continue to try to block the sale of the painting, they meet with an auctioneer from Christie's and learn that it is likely an original Georges de La Tour and is worth about a million dollars. Learning the news they return home only to find from Roxanne that Charles-Henri has decided to agree with Roxanne's wishes that the painting be left out of the divorce and instead be willed to their children. The rest of the family is incensed at Roxanne and demand she sell the painting.

Shortly after Isabel joins her step-mother, Margeeve, Roxanne's mother-in-law Suzanne and their grandchildren take a trip to Euro Disney where Isabel is accosted by Magda's husband. Tellman kidnaps Suzanne, Margeeve and the grandchildren for seven hours but later releases them. Isabel returns home to Roxanne's and discovers that Tellman killed Charles-Henri and attempted to murder his wife, Magda.

The Walkers realize that they can now go forward with the sale of the Saint Ursula painting without having to give anything to Charles-Henri's family. It sells for nearly two million dollars, which Isabel realizes 1/4 of which will go to her. Roxanne goes into labor the same day and gives birth to a boy she calls Charles-Luc after his father. At Charles-Henri's funeral, Isabel reflects that Roxanne always gets what she wants and will now be treated as a valued member of the Persand family without the stain of divorce upon her.

== Characters ==
=== The Walker Family ===
- Isabel Walker, an aimless twenty-something film school drop-out
- Roxanne Walker, an American poet living in Paris

=== The de Persand Family ===
- Suzanne de Persand, the de Persand family matriarch
- Edward Cosset, Suzanne brother
- Charles-Henri de Persand, Roxy's husband who is a painter

== Reception ==
Le Divorce received positive reviews. The New York Times called it "a genuinely wise and humane novel, by a very good writer".

== Connections to other literary works ==
Le Divorce is, in part, a self-referential update of Henry James' The Portrait of a Lady. The name of Le Divorce's narrator Isabel Walker is similar to that of Portrait's heroine Isabel Archer, which the Walker character notes on more than one occasion.
