= John F. Murray =

American pulmonologist (1927–2020)

John Frederic Murray (June 8, 1927 – March 24, 2020) was an American pulmonologist best known for his work on acute respiratory distress syndrome (ARDS), which was responsible for his death after he fell ill with COVID-19 during the COVID-19 pandemic. On the international stage, he was involved for more than 40 years in the work of the International Union Against Tuberculosis and Lung Disease (the Union), based in Paris. As its secretary general, he extended the scope of the organisation to diseases other than TB, and made its membership much less exclusive.

Murray, the son of cartoonist and former Olympic hurdler Frederick “Feg” Murray, and his wife, Dorothy (née Hanna) was born in Mineola, New York. After his father moved the family to Los Angeles and after a period of wartime national service in the US navy as a radar engineer, Murray entered Stanford University and then the Stanford University Medical School, graduating in 1953. He was a Professor of Medicine emeritus at the University of California, San Francisco (UCSF) School of Medicine and Chief of Pulmonary and Critical Care at San Francisco General Hospital from 1966 to 1989. After retiring from his full-time positions, he lived part-time in France with his wife, the writer Diane Johnson, where he died in Paris after being infected by COVID-19.

== Works ==
- Murray and Nadel's Textbook of Respiratory Medicine
- Intensive Care: A Doctor’s Journal
