= The Shining (film) =

1980 film by Stanley Kubrick

- UK theatrical release poster
- Directed by: Stanley Kubrick
- Screenplay by: Stanley Kubrick; Diane Johnson
- Based on: The Shining by Stephen King
- Produced by: Stanley Kubrick
- Starring: Jack Nicholson; Shelley Duvall; Scatman Crothers; Danny Lloyd
- Cinematography: John Alcott
- Edited by: Ray Lovejoy
- Music by: Wendy Carlos; Rachel Elkind
- Production companies: The Producer Circle Company; Peregrine Productions; Hawk Films
- Distributed by: Warner Bros.
- Release dates: May 23, 1980 (United States); October 2, 1980 (United Kingdom)
- Running time: 146 minutes (premiere); 144 minutes (United States); 119 minutes (Europe)
- Countries: United Kingdom; United States
- Language: English
- Budget: $19 million
- Box office: $57 million

The Shining is a 1980 psychological horror film produced and directed by Stanley Kubrick and co-written with novelist Diane Johnson. It is based on Stephen King's 1977 novel and stars Jack Nicholson, Shelley Duvall, Danny Lloyd and Scatman Crothers. The film presents the descent into insanity of a recovering alcoholic and aspiring novelist who takes a job as winter caretaker for a mountain resort hotel with his wife and clairvoyant son.

Production took place almost exclusively in England at EMI Elstree Studios, with sets based on real locations. Kubrick often worked with a small crew, which allowed him to do many takes, sometimes to the exhaustion of the actors and staff. The then-new Steadicam mount was used to shoot several scenes, giving the film an innovative and immersive look and feel.

The film was released in the United States on May 23, 1980, by Warner Bros., and in the United Kingdom on October 2 via Columbia-EMI-Warner Distributors. There were several versions for theatrical releases, each of which was cut shorter than the preceding cut; about 27 minutes was cut in total. Reactions to the film at the time of its release were mixed; King criticized the film due to its deviations from the novel, which led King to produce in 1997 a three-part miniseries adaptation as more faithful to his novel. The film received two controversial nominations at the 1st Golden Raspberry Awards in 1981—Worst Director and Worst Actress—the latter of which was later rescinded in 2022 due to Kubrick's alleged treatment of Duvall on set.

The Shining has since been critically reappraised and is often cited as one of the greatest horror films ever made. In 2018, it was selected for preservation in the United States National Film Registry by the Library of Congress as being "culturally, historically, or aesthetically significant." A sequel titled Doctor Sleep, based on King's 2013 novel of the same name, was adapted to film and released in 2019.

== Plot ==
Jack Torrance takes a caretaker position to look after the remote Overlook Hotel in the Colorado Rocky Mountains while it is closed for the winter. On arrival, hotel manager Stuart Ullman informs Jack that a previous caretaker, Charles Grady, killed his wife, two young daughters and himself in the hotel a decade prior.

At home in Boulder, Jack's son Danny has a premonition and seizure; Jack's wife, Wendy, tells the doctor about a past incident when Jack accidentally dislocated Danny's shoulder during a drunken rage. Jack has been sober ever since. Before leaving for the seasonal break, the Overlook's head chef, Dick Hallorann, informs Danny of a telepathic ability the two share, which Hallorann's grandmother called "shining". He tells Danny that the hotel also "shines" due to its residual and unpleasant history and warns him to avoid room 237.

A month passes, and Danny starts having frightening visions, including those of the murdered Grady sisters. Meanwhile, Jack's mental health deteriorates; he suffers from writer's block, is prone to violent outbursts, and has dreams of killing his family. Danny gets lured to room 237 by unseen forces, and Wendy later finds him with signs of physical trauma, for which she blames Jack. Jack defiantly sulks in the ballroom, where ghostly bartender Lloyd entices him back to drinking. Wendy tells him that Danny was attacked by a "crazy woman" in room 237. Jack investigates and encounters a hideous female ghost in the bathroom, but tells Wendy he saw nothing. He blames Danny for inflicting the bruises on himself and reacts angrily when Wendy suggests leaving the hotel. Danny enters a trance and telepathically contacts Hallorann. Returning to the ballroom, Jack finds it filled with ghostly figures, including waiter Delbert Grady, who urges Jack to "correct" his wife and child.

Wendy finds Jack's manuscript written with nothing but countless repetitions of the proverb "All work and no play makes Jack a dull boy". When Jack threatens her life, Wendy knocks him unconscious with a baseball bat and locks him in the kitchen pantry, but she and Danny are snowed in—Jack previously sabotaged the hotel's two-way radio and snowcat. Back in their private apartment, Danny begins to chant, from a murmur, "red rum" more and more loudly ("red RUM") and writes it out in lipstick on the bathroom door. Wendy sees the word in the mirror which shows that it spells MURDER in reverse, and she panics.

Grady frees Jack, who goes after Wendy and Danny with an axe. Taking shelter in the bathroom, Wendy fights off Jack with a knife when he tries to break through the door; Danny escapes out the bathroom window. Hallorann, having flown back to Colorado from his winter home in Florida, reaches the hotel by snowcat. Jack ambushes and murders him with the axe, then pursues Danny into an expansive hedge maze on the hotel grounds. With trepidation Wendy runs through the hotel looking for Danny, encountering the hotel's ghosts, Hallorann's bloody corpse, and a vision of cascading blood from an elevator similar to Danny's premonition. Danny carefully backtracks in the snow to mislead Jack and hides behind a snowdrift. While Jack rushes ahead without a trail to follow and becomes lost, Danny exits the maze and is found by Wendy. The two depart the Overlook in Hallorann's snowcat, leaving Jack to freeze to death in the maze. Meanwhile, a photograph in the hotel hallway pictures a man, by all appearances Jack, standing amidst a crowd of party revelers from July 4, 1921.

== Cast ==
- Jack Nicholson as Jack Torrance
- Shelley Duvall as Wendy Torrance, Jack's wife
- Danny Lloyd as Danny "Doc" Torrance, Jack and Wendy's son
- Scatman Crothers as Dick Hallorann
- Barry Nelson as Stuart Ullman
- Philip Stone as Delbert Grady
- Joe Turkel as Lloyd
- Anne Jackson as Doctor
- Tony Burton as Larry Durkin
- Lia Beldam as young woman in bath
- Billie Gibson as old woman in bath
- Barry Dennen as Bill Watson
- Lisa and Louise Burns as the Grady "twins"

In the European cut, all of the scenes involving Jackson and Burton were removed but the credits remained unchanged. Dennen is on-screen in all versions of the film, albeit to a limited degree (and no dialogue) in the European cut.

The actresses who played the ghosts of the murdered Grady daughters, Lisa and Louise Burns, are identical twins. The characters in the book and film script are sisters, but not twins. In the film's dialogue, Ullman says that he thinks that they were "about eight and ten". Nonetheless, they are frequently referred to in discussions about the film as "the Grady twins".

There is a resemblance in the staging of the Grady girls and the Identical Twins, Roselle, New Jersey, 1967 photograph by Diane Arbus according to Arbus' biographer, Patricia Bosworth, the Kubrick assistant who cast and coached them, Leon Vitali, and by numerous Kubrick critics. Kubrick both met Arbus personally and studied photography under her during his time as a photographer for Look magazine; Kubrick's widow says he did not deliberately model the Grady girls on Arbus' photograph, in spite of widespread attention to the resemblance.

== Analysis ==
=== Social interpretations ===
The film's most famous scene, when Jack places his face through the broken door and says, "Here's Johnny!", which echoes scenes in both D. W. Griffith's Broken Blossoms (1919) and the 1921 Swedish horror film The Phantom Carriage.

Film critic Jonathan Romney writes that the film has been interpreted in many ways, including addressing the topics of the crisis in masculinity, sexism, corporate America, and racism. "It's tempting to read The Shining as an Oedipal struggle not just between generations but between Jack's culture of the written word and Danny's culture of images", Romney writes, "Jack also uses the written word to more mundane purpose – to sign his 'contract' with the Overlook. 'I gave my word', ... which we take to mean 'gave his soul' in the ... Faustian sense. But maybe he means it more literally – by the end ... he has renounced language entirely, pursuing Danny through the maze with an inarticulate animal roar. What he has entered into is a conventional business deal that places commercial obligation ... over the unspoken contract of compassion and empathy that he seems to have neglected to sign with his family."

Several critics have also interpreted The Shining less as a conventional ghost story than as a work about family violence, patriarchal authority, and the collapse of masculine identity. In Feminist Studies, Elizabeth Jean Hornbeck argues that, despite its Gothic and supernatural elements, the film is "at its core, a story about domestic violence", with Jack Torrance functioning as a predatory father figure within an already damaged family. Laura Miller similarly contrasted Kubrick's film with Stephen King's novel, arguing that whereas King's version foregrounds alcoholism and domestic abuse as moral and familial failures, Kubrick's adaptation presents domestic violence in a more impersonal and deterministic form. More broadly, Jonathan Romney has connected the film to themes of masculinity and sexism, reading Jack's disintegration as part of a wider crisis of male authority within the family.

==== Native Americans ====
Among interpreters who see the film reflecting more subtly the social concerns that animate other Kubrick films, one of the early viewpoints was discussed in an essay by ABC reporter Bill Blakemore titled "Kubrick's 'Shining' Secret: Film's Hidden Horror Is the Murder of the Indian", first published in The Washington Post on July 12, 1987. He believes that indirect references to American killings of Native Americans pervade the film, as exemplified by the Amerindian logos on the baking powder in the kitchen and the Amerindian artwork that appears throughout the hotel, though no Native Americans are seen. Stuart Ullman tells Wendy that when building the hotel, a few Indian attacks had to be fended off since it was constructed on an Indian burial ground.

Blakemore's general argument is that the film is a metaphor for the genocide of Native Americans. He notes that when Jack kills Hallorann, the dead body is seen lying on a rug with an Indian motif. The blood in the elevator shafts is, for Blakemore, the blood of the Indians in the burial ground on which the hotel was built. The date of the final photograph, July 4, is meant to be ironic. Blakemore writes:

As with some of his other movies, Kubrick ends The Shining with a powerful visual puzzle that forces the audience to leave the theater asking, "What was that all about?" The Shining ends with an extremely long camera shot moving down a hallway in the Overlook, reaching eventually the central photo among 21 photos on the wall, each capturing previous good times in the hotel. At the head of the party is none other than the Jack we've just seen in 1980. The caption reads: "Overlook Hotel – July 4th Ball – 1921." The answer to this puzzle, which is a master key to unlocking the whole movie, is that most Americans overlook the fact that July Fourth was no ball, nor any kind of Independence day, for native Americans; that the weak American villain of the film is the re-embodiment of the American men who massacred the Indians in earlier years; that Kubrick is examining and reflecting on a problem that cuts through the decades and centuries.

Film writer John Capo sees the film as an allegory of American imperialism. This is exemplified by many clues, such as the closing photo of Jack in the past at a Fourth of July party, or Jack's earlier reference to the Rudyard Kipling poem "The White Man's Burden", which was written to advocate the American colonial seizure of the Philippine islands, justifying imperial conquest as a mission of civilization.

The artwork of Indigenous Canadian artist Norval Morrisseau can be seen throughout the film, including the paintings The Great Earth Mother (1976), and Flock of Loons (1975).

==== Geoffrey Cocks and Kubrick's concern with the Holocaust ====
Film historian Geoffrey Cocks has extended Blakemore's idea that the film has a subtext about Native Americans by arguing that the film indirectly reflects Stanley Kubrick's concerns about the Holocaust (both Cocks's book and Michael Herr's memoir of Kubrick discuss how he wanted his entire life to make a film dealing directly with the Holocaust but could never quite make up his mind). Cocks, writing in his book The Wolf at the Door: Stanley Kubrick, History and the Holocaust, proposed a controversial theory that all of Kubrick's work is informed by the Holocaust; there is, he says, a holocaust subtext in The Shining. This, Cocks believes, is why Kubrick's screenplay goes to emotional extremes, omitting much of the novel's supernaturalism and making the character of Wendy much more hysteria-prone. Cocks places Kubrick's vision of a haunted hotel in line with a long literary tradition of hotels in which sinister events occur, from Stephen Crane's short story "The Blue Hotel" (which Kubrick admired) to the Swiss Berghof in Thomas Mann's novel The Magic Mountain, about a snowbound sanatorium high in the Swiss Alps in which the protagonist witnesses a series of events which are a microcosm of the decline of Western culture.

Cocks claims that Kubrick has elaborately coded many of his historical concerns into the film with manipulations of numbers and colors and his choice of musical numbers, many of which are post-war compositions influenced by the horrors of World War II. Of particular note is Kubrick's use of Krzysztof Penderecki's The Awakening of Jacob to accompany Jack Torrance's dream of killing his family and Danny's vision of past carnage in the hotel, a piece of music originally associated with the horrors of the Holocaust.

Cocks's work has been anthologized and discussed in other works on Stanley Kubrick films, though sometimes with skepticism. Julian Rice, writing in the opening chapter of his book Kubrick's Hope, believes Cocks's views are excessively speculative and contain too many strained "critical leaps" of faith. Rice holds that what went on in Kubrick's mind cannot be replicated or corroborated beyond a broad vision of the nature of good and evil (which included concern about the Holocaust) but Kubrick's art is not governed by this one obsession. Diane Johnson, co-screenwriter for The Shining, commented on Cocks's observations, saying that preoccupation with the Holocaust on Kubrick's part could very likely have motivated his decision to place the hotel on a Native American burial ground, although Kubrick never directly mentioned it to her.

=== Literary allusions ===
Geoffrey Cocks notes that the film contains many allusions to fairy-tales, both Hansel and Gretel and The Three Little Pigs, with Jack Torrance identified as the Big Bad Wolf, which Bruno Bettelheim interprets as standing for "all the asocial unconscious devouring powers" that must be overcome by a child's ego.

The saying "all work and no play makes Jack a dull boy" appeared first in James Howell's Proverbs in English, Italian, French and Spanish (1659).

=== Artworks in the film ===
Numerous paintings and sculptures appear throughout the film. Several paintings by Group of Seven artists appear including The Solemn Land (1921) by J. E. H. MacDonald, Northern River (1914) by Tom Thomson, Stormy Weather, Georgian Bay (1921) by Frederick Varley, Red Maple (1914) by A. Y. Jackson, Mist Fantasy, Sand River, Algoma (1920) by J.E.H. MacDonald, Maligne Lake, Jasper Park (1924) by Lawren Harris, Beaver Swamp (1920) by Lawren Harris, and Arpeggio (1932) by Frederick Varley. Two paintings by Indigenous Canadian artist Norval Morrisseau can be seen in the film: The Great Earth Mother (1976) and Flock of Loons (1975)––Morriseau was part of the Professional Native Indian Artists Inc. (PNIAI) which came to be informally known as the "Indian Group of Seven".

Many of the paintings that appear include depictions of Canada or are painted by Canadian artists including Le Campement du Trappeur (1931) by Clarence Gagnon, December Afternoon (1969) by Hugh Monahan, Log Hut on the St. Maurice (1862) and Paysage d'hiver, Laval (1849) by Cornelius Krieghoff, After The Bath (1890) by Paul Peel, Site du : "Combat de la Grange" September 25, 1775 (1839) by Louise-Amélie Panet, Starlight: Indian Papoose (n.d.) and Chief Bear Paw (n.d.) by Nicholas Raphael de Grandmaison, Montreal from the Mountain (1838) by William Henry Bartlett, Makah Returning in their War Canoes (1845–1859) by Paul Kane, Mill on the Cliff (n.d.) by Nicholas Hornyansky, The Johnson House, Hanover (1932–42) by Carl Schaefer, and Cooper's Hawk (1974) and Glaucous-Winged Gull (1973) by J. Fenwick Lansdowne.

A number of paintings by Alex Colville make appearances including Woman and Terrier (1963), Horse and Train (1954), Hound in Field (1958), Dog, Boy, and St. John River (1958), and Moon and Cow (1963).

Several portraits by Dorothy Oxborough of children from the Bearspaw band of the Stoney/Nakoda people appear in the film. Oxborough's portraits were often reproduced as decorative prints, framed souvenirs, greeting cards, novelties, and calendars. Oxborough, born in Calgary, Alberta, was criticized for infantilizing and culturally insensitive depictions of indigenous people.

Four etchings by John Webber appear in the film, A Man of Nootka Sound (1778), A Woman of Oonalashka (1784), A Woman of Prince William Sound (1784), and A Man of Van Diemen's Land (1777). Webber accompanied James Cook on his third voyage to Hawaii, New Zealand, and Vancouver Island.

=== Ambiguities in the film ===
Roger Ebert notes that the film does not really have a "reliable observer", with the possible exception of Dick Hallorann. Ebert believes various events call into question the reliability of Jack, Wendy, and Danny. This leads Ebert to conclude that:

Kubrick is telling a story with ghosts (the two girls, the former caretaker and a bartender), but it isn't a "ghost story", because the ghosts may not be present in any sense at all except as visions experienced by Jack or Danny.

Ebert concludes that "The movie is not about ghosts but about madness and the energies it sets loose in an isolated situation primed to magnify them". The film critic James Berardinelli notes that "King would have us believe that the hotel is haunted. Kubrick is less definitive in the interpretations he offers." He dubs the film a failure as a ghost story, but brilliant as a study of "madness and the unreliable narrator".

=== Ghosts versus cabin fever ===
In some sequences, there is a question of whether or not there are ghosts present. In the scenes where Jack sees ghosts, he is always facing a mirror or, in the case of his storeroom conversation with Grady, a reflective, highly polished door. Film reviewer James Berardinelli notes "It has been pointed out that there's a mirror in every scene in which Jack sees a ghost, causing us to wonder whether the spirits are reflections of a tortured psyche." In Hollywood's Stephen King, Tony Magistrale wrote,

Kubrick's reliance on mirrors as visual aids for underscoring the thematic meaning of this film portrays visually the internal transformations and oppositions that are occurring to Jack Torrance psychologically. Through ... these devices, Kubrick dramatizes the hotel's methodical assault on Torrance's identity, its ability to stimulate the myriad of self-doubts and anxieties by creating opportunities to warp Torrance's perspective on himself and [his family]. Furthermore, the fact that Jack looks into a mirror whenever he "speaks" to the hotel means, to some extent, that Kubrick implicates him directly into the hotel's "consciousness", because Jack is, in effect, talking to himself.

Ghosts are the implied explanation for Jack's seemingly physically impossible escape from the locked storeroom. In an interview of Kubrick by scholar Michel Ciment, the director made comments about the scene in the book that may imply he similarly thought of the scene in the film as a key reveal in this dichotomy:

It seemed to strike an extraordinary balance between the psychological and the supernatural in such a way as to lead you to think that the supernatural would eventually be explained by the psychological: 'Jack must be imagining these things because he's crazy.' This allowed you to suspend your doubt of the supernatural until you were so thoroughly into the story that you could accept it almost without noticing ... It's not until Grady, the ghost of the former caretaker who axed to death his family, slides open the bolt of the larder door, allowing Jack to escape, that you are left with no other explanation but the supernatural.

=== Two Gradys and other doubles ===
Early in the film, Stuart Ullman tells Jack of a previous caretaker, Charles Grady, who, in 1970, succumbed to cabin fever, murdered his family and then killed himself. Later, Jack meets a ghostly butler named Grady. Jack says that he knows about the murders, claiming to recognize Grady from pictures, but the butler introduces himself as Delbert Grady.

Gordon Dahlquist of The Kubrick FAQ argues that the name change "deliberately mirrors Jack Torrance being both the husband of Wendy/father of Danny and the mysterious man in the 1920s July Fourth photo. It is to say he is two people: the man with choice in a perilous situation and the man who has 'always' been at the Overlook. It's a mistake to see the final photo as evidence that the events of the film are predetermined: Jack has any number of moments where he can act other than the way he does and that his (poor) choices are fueled by weakness and fear perhaps merely speaks all the more to the questions about the personal and the political that The Shining brings up. In the same way Charles had a chance – once more, perhaps – to not take on Delbert's legacy, so Jack may have had a chance to escape his role as 'caretaker' to the interests of the powerful. It's the tragic course of this story that he chooses not to."

Dahlquist's argument is that Delbert Grady, the 1920s butler, and Charles Grady, the 1970s caretaker, rather than being either two people or the same are two 'manifestations' of a similar entity; a part permanently at the hotel (Delbert) and the part which is given the choice of whether to join the legacy of the hotel's murderous past (Charles), just as the man in the photo is not exactly Jack Torrance but nor is he someone different. Jack in the photo has 'always' been at the Overlook; Jack the caretaker chooses to become part of the hotel. The film's assistant editor Gordon Stainforth has commented on this issue, attempting to steer a course between the continuity-error explanation on one side and the hidden-meaning explanation on the other; "I don't think we'll ever quite unravel this. Was his full name Charles Delbert Grady? Perhaps Charles was a sort of nickname? Perhaps Ullman got the name wrong? But I also think that Stanley did NOT want the whole story to fit together too neatly, so [it is] absolutely correct, I think, to say that 'the sum of what we learn refuses to add up neatly'."

Among Kubrick's other doubling/mirroring effects in the film:

- In the U.S. version, Jack's interview with Ullman, whose confident affability contrasts with Jack's seemingly forced nonchalance, is paired with Wendy's meeting with a female doctor, whose somber and professional manner contrasts with Wendy's nervousness.
- During the interview, Jack and Ullman are joined by a hotel employee named Bill Watson, who looks similar to Jack from behind, creating a pseudo–mirror image effect as they sit in chairs to the front-left and front-right of Ullman's desk.
- The Grady sisters look so similar that they appear to be twins, though they are different ages (Ullman states that he thinks that they were about eight and ten).
- On two occasions, Ullman says goodbye to two young female employees and in the second case, they closely resemble each other.
- The film contains two mazes, the hedges outside and, per Wendy's characterization, the Overlook. The hedge maze appears in two forms, the 13-foot-high version outside and the model inside the Overlook. In the overhead shot zooming down on Wendy and Danny in the center of the maze, the maze differs from the map outside and from the model having far more corridors, and the left and right sides are mirror images of each other. The Overlook significantly breaks down into two sections, one old and one remodeled; one past, one present.
- Two versions of the bathing woman inhabit Room 237.
- In Hallorann's Miami bedroom, two paintings showing similar nude black women are seen on opposite walls just before he experiences a "shining".
- There appear to be two Jack Torrances, the one who goes mad and freezes to death in the present and the one who appears in a 1921 photograph that hangs on the gold corridor wall inside the Overlook.

=== Photograph ===
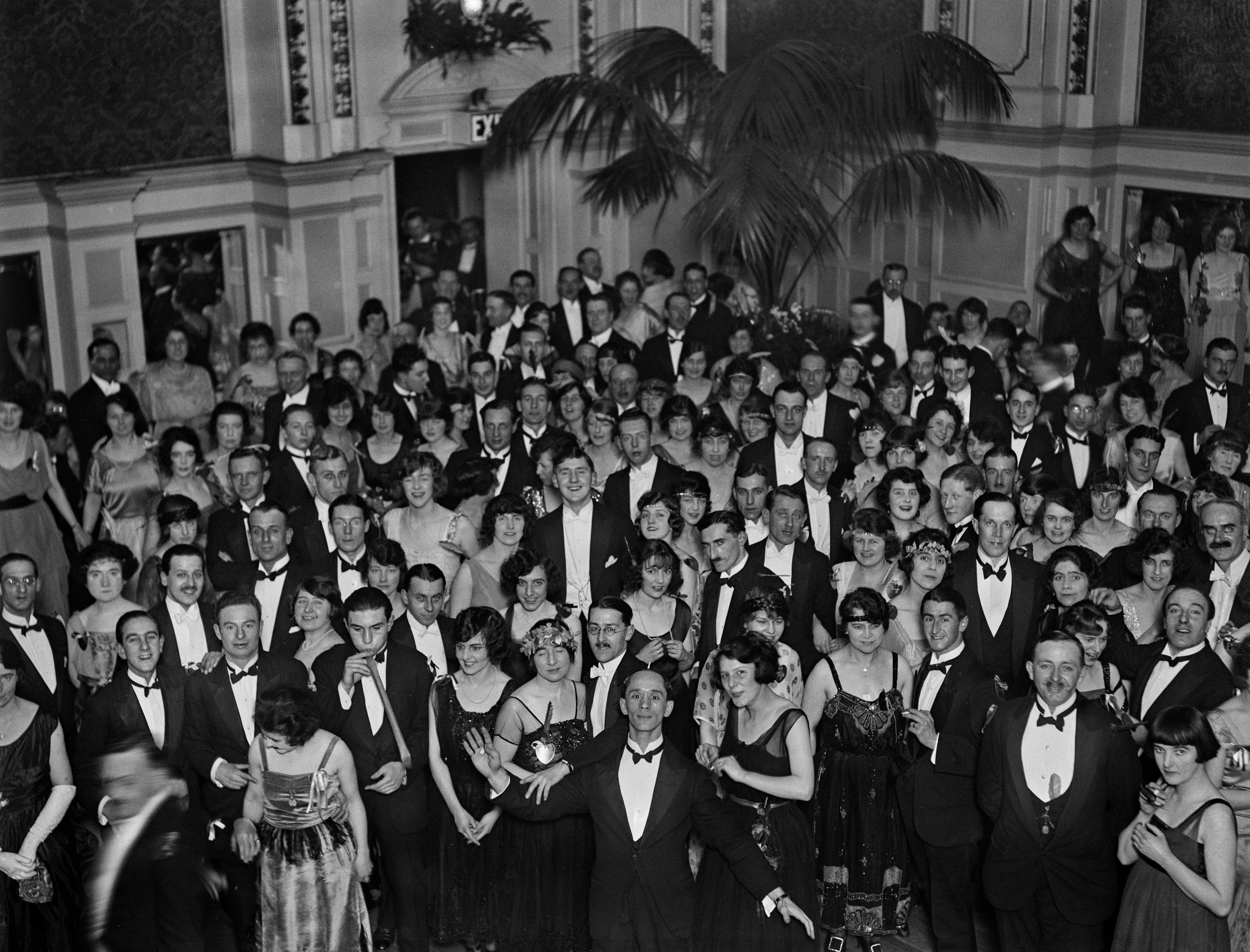
For the ending, Nicholson's face was superimposed over this authentic 1921 dance picture.

The ending photograph has been described as "iconic". The provenance of the original photo used in the ending shot was discovered in April 2025. Conspiracy theories about its source have been discussed since the release of The Shining. Identified on screen as a July 4 ball at the Overlook Hotel in 1921, the real event depicted was discovered to be a Valentine's Day dance in 1921 at the Empress Rooms of the Royal Palace Hotel in Kensington, London. Jack Nicholson's face was airbrushed over that of John Golman, who would later be a well-known ballroom dance instructor and author under the stage name Santos Casani.

In an interview with Michel Ciment, Kubrick said that the photograph suggests that Jack was a reincarnation of an earlier official at the hotel. This has not stopped alternative readings, such as that Jack has been "absorbed" into the Overlook Hotel. Film critic Jonathan Romney, while acknowledging the absorption theory, wrote:

As the ghostly butler Grady (Philip Stone) tells him during their chilling confrontation in the men's toilet, 'You're the caretaker, sir. You've always been the caretaker.' Perhaps in some earlier incarnation Jack really was around in 1921, and it's his present-day self that is the shadow, the phantom photographic copy. But if his picture has been there all along, why has no one noticed it? After all, it's right at the center of the central picture on the wall, and the Torrances have had a painfully drawn-out winter of mind-numbing leisure in which to inspect every corner of the place. Is it just that, like Poe's purloined letter, the thing in plain sight is the last thing you see? When you do see it, the effect is so unsettling because you realise the unthinkable was there under your nose – overlooked – the whole time.

=== Spatial layout of the Overlook Hotel ===
Screenwriter Todd Alcott has noted:

Much has been written, some of it quite intelligent, about the spatial anomalies and inconsistencies in The Shining: there are rooms with windows that should not be there and doors that couldn't possibly lead to anywhere, rooms appear to be in one place in one scene and another place in another, wall fixtures and furniture pieces appear and disappear from scene to scene, props move from one room to another, and the layout of the Overlook makes no physical sense.

A 1998 essay by Paolo Cherchi Usai states that The Shining resumes 2001: A Space Odyssey's "differentiated, anomalous perspectives, reproducing the figurative schemes of Escher's lithographs". In the Overlook, "it is practically impossible to reconstruct the plan of the building and each room... for those who find themselves within the walls of the Overlook, or among the hedges of the maze, the sensation is inevitable... we know nothing of the rhythm with which doors and corners will alternate: and we suspect that we will never know."

Artist Juli Kearns first identified and created maps of spatial discrepancies in the layout of the Overlook Hotel, the interiors of which were constructed in studios in England. These spatial discrepancies included windows appearing in impossible places, such as in Stuart Ullman's office, which is surrounded by interior hallways, and apartment doorways positioned in places where they cannot possibly lead to apartments. Rob Ager is another proponent of this theory. Jan Harlan, an Executive Producer on The Shining, was asked about the discontinuity of sets by Xan Brooks of The Guardian and confirmed the discontinuity was intentional, "The set was very deliberately built to be offbeat and off the track, so that the huge ballroom would never actually fit inside. The audience is deliberately made not to know where they're going. People say The Shining doesn't make sense. Well spotted! It's a ghost movie. It's not supposed to make sense." Harlan further elaborated to Kate Abbot, "Stephen King gave him the go-ahead to change his book, so Stanley agreed – and wrote a much more ambiguous script. It's clear instantly there's something foul going on. At the little hotel, everything is like Disney, all kitsch wood on the outside – but the interiors don't make sense. Those huge corridors and ballrooms couldn't fit inside. In fact, nothing makes sense."

== Production ==
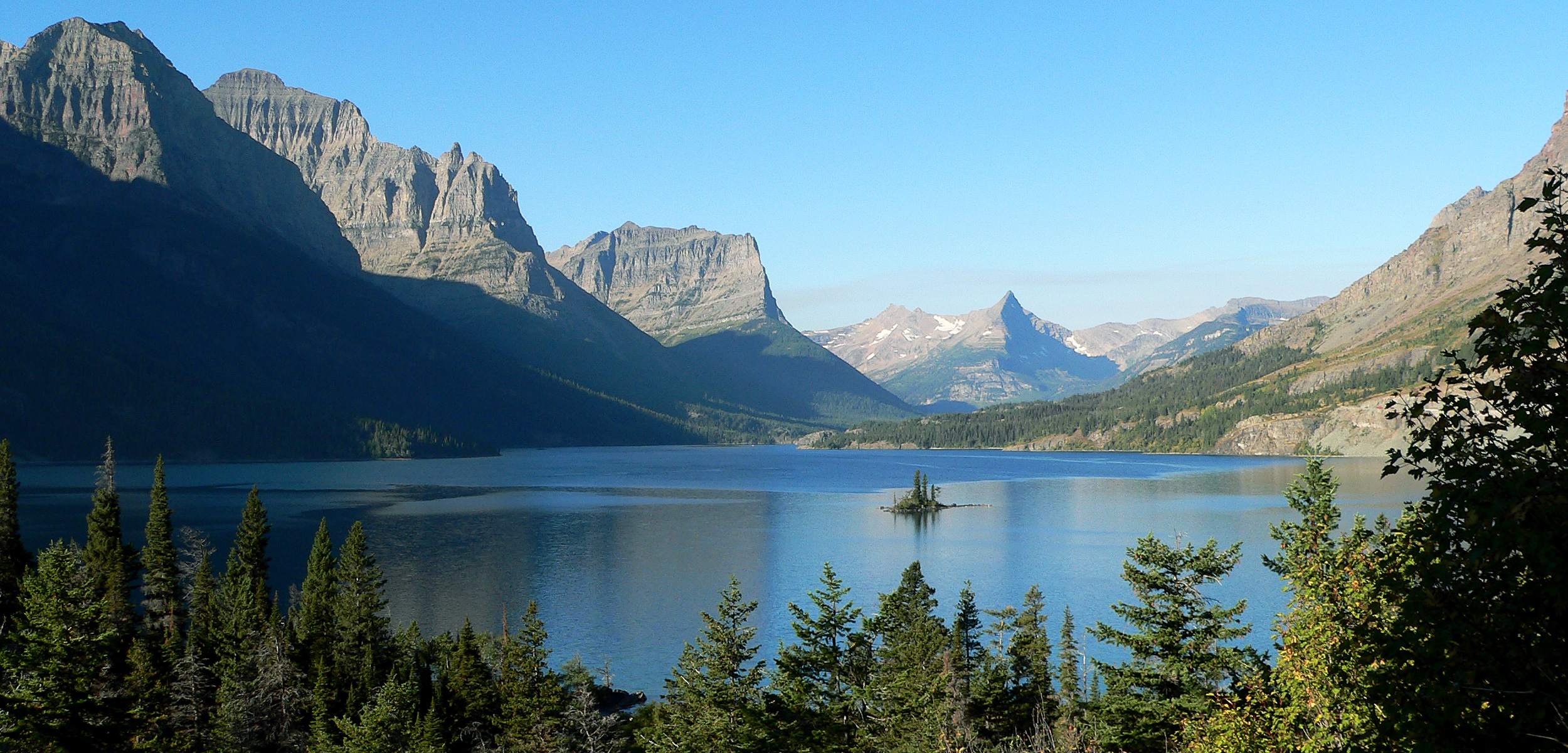
Saint Mary Lake with its Wild Goose Island is seen during the opening scene of The Shining.

=== Development ===
Before making The Shining, Stanley Kubrick directed the film Barry Lyndon (1975), a highly visual period film about an Irishman who attempts to make his way into the European aristocracy. Despite its technical achievements, the film was not a box-office success in the United States of America and was derided by critics for being too long and too slow. Disappointed with Barry Lyndon's lack of success, Kubrick realized he needed to make a film that would be commercially viable as well as artistically fulfilling. Stephen King was told that Kubrick had his staff bring him stacks of horror books as he planted himself in his office to read them all: "Kubrick's secretary heard the sound of each book hitting the wall as the director flung it into a reject pile after reading the first few pages. Finally, one day the secretary noticed it had been a while since she had heard the thud of another writer's work biting the dust. She walked in to check on her boss and found Kubrick deeply engrossed in reading a copy of the manuscript of The Shining".

Speaking about the theme of the film, Kubrick stated that "there's something inherently wrong with the human personality. There's an evil side to it. One of the things that horror stories can do is to show us the archetypes of the unconscious; we can see the dark side without having to confront it directly".

=== Writing ===
In 1977, a Warner Bros. executive, John Calley, sent Kubrick the proofs of what would become the novel. Its author, Stephen King, was already at that time a best-selling author who, after the blockbuster of Carrie, could boast of successes in adaptations for the big screen. For his part, Kubrick had been considering directing a horror film for some time; a few years before, while Barry Lyndon disappointed at the box office, another Warner film he had refused to direct, The Exorcist, directed by William Friedkin, was breaking box office records around the world.

Asked what it was that attracted Kubrick to the idea of adapting the novel by the popular writer, a regular on the best-seller lists, his executive producer (and brother-in-law) Jan Harlan revealed that Kubrick wanted to "try" in this film genre, although with the condition of being able to change King's novel, a condition that would finally be guaranteed by contract.

The script was written by the director himself with the collaboration of novelist Diane Johnson, after being impressed by Johnson's 1974 novel The Shadow Knows. Kubrick had rejected the initial version of the draft, written by King, as too literal an adaptation of the novel. Furthermore, the filmmaker did not believe in ghost stories because that "would imply the possibility that there was something after death," and he did not believe there was anything, "not even hell." Instead, Johnson, who was teaching a Gothic novel seminar at the University of California at Berkeley at the time, seemed like a better fit for the project. She was visiting England in late 1976 when she received a cold call from Kubrick asking her to discuss the project.

Kubrick and Johnson took inspiration from 18th and 19th century Gothic novels, Sigmund Freud's essay on the uncanny, the book The Uses of Enchantment (1976), and the short story "The Blue Hotel" (1898).

Shortly after the premiere, in an interview with the Parisian magazine Positif, she stated:

Among us, The Shining (the novel) is not part of great literature. It is scary, it is effective and it works, without further ado ... But it is precisely interesting to see how a very bad book can also be very effective.- ... It's quite pretentious. But it is also true that one has less scruples when destroying it: one is aware that a great work of art is not being destroyed.

Kubrick was more enthusiastic about the possibilities of the manuscript:

It was the first time that I had read to the end a novel that was sent to me with a view to a possible film adaptation. I was absorbed in its reading and it seemed to me that its plot, ideas and structure were much more imaginative than usual in the horror genre; I thought that a great movie could come from there.

=== Casting ===
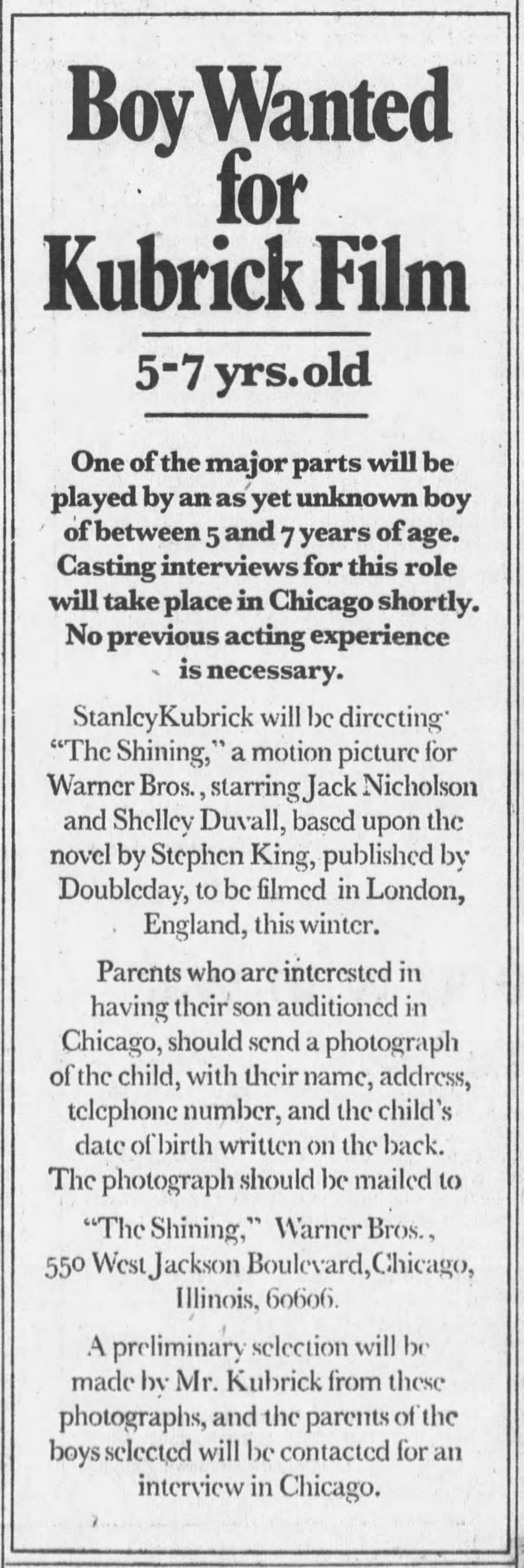
Newspaper ad for the role of Danny Torrance

Jack Nicholson was Kubrick's first choice for the role of Jack Torrance; other actors considered included Robert De Niro (who said the film gave him nightmares for a month), Robin Williams and Harrison Ford, all of whom met with King's disapproval. Kris Kristofferson was Kubrick's backup choice if Nicholson had declined. King, for his part, disavowed Nicholson because he thought that, because of his part in One Flew Over the Cuckoo's Nest, the viewer would tend to consider him an unstable individual from the beginning. For this reason, King preferred Jon Voight, Michael Moriarty or Martin Sheen for the role, who would more faithfully represent the profile of the ordinary individual who is gradually driven to madness. In any case, from the beginning the writer was told that the actor for the lead role "was not negotiable".

Although Nicholson initially suggested that Jessica Lange would be a better fit for the role of Wendy Torrance, Shelley Duvall knew early that she was the one cast for the role (Nicholson would work with Lange on his next movie, The Postman Always Rings Twice). Wendy's character in the film differs from the novel, appearing less capable and more vulnerable. Throughout filming, Kubrick pushed Duvall, she said, "to get the performance out of me that he wanted". King said in a 1978 interview that the casting of Duvall was "an example of absolutely grotesque casting".

Slim Pickens was offered the role of Dick Hallorann, but Pickens remembered his experience of working with Kubrick on Dr. Strangelove and told the director that he would take the role only if his scenes in the film were shot in fewer than 100 takes. Kubrick declined and Scatman Crothers got the part after he had been suggested by Pickens's agent.

The director's initial candidate to play the Torrances' son Danny Torrance was Cary Guffey (Close Encounters of the Third Kind), but the young actor's parents refused, saying the film was too gruesome for a child. In his search to find the right actor to play Danny, Kubrick sent Leon (who portrayed Lord Bullingdon in Barry Lyndon) and Kersti Vitali, a husband-and-wife team, to Chicago, Denver and Cincinnati to create an interview pool of 5,000 boys over a six-month period. These cities were chosen since Kubrick was looking for a boy with an accent that fell between Jack Nicholson's and Shelley Duvall's speech patterns, with Nicholson coming from New Jersey and Duvall from Texas. During the filming, Danny Lloyd, the young actor selected, was protected in a special way by Kubrick; the boy believed at all times that he was shooting a drama, not a horror movie. Following his role in the 1982 film Will: G. Gordon Liddy, Lloyd abandoned his acting career.

=== Filming ===
Principal photography began in May 1978 and wrapped in April 1979, it took place mainly in Elstree Studios, in southern England.

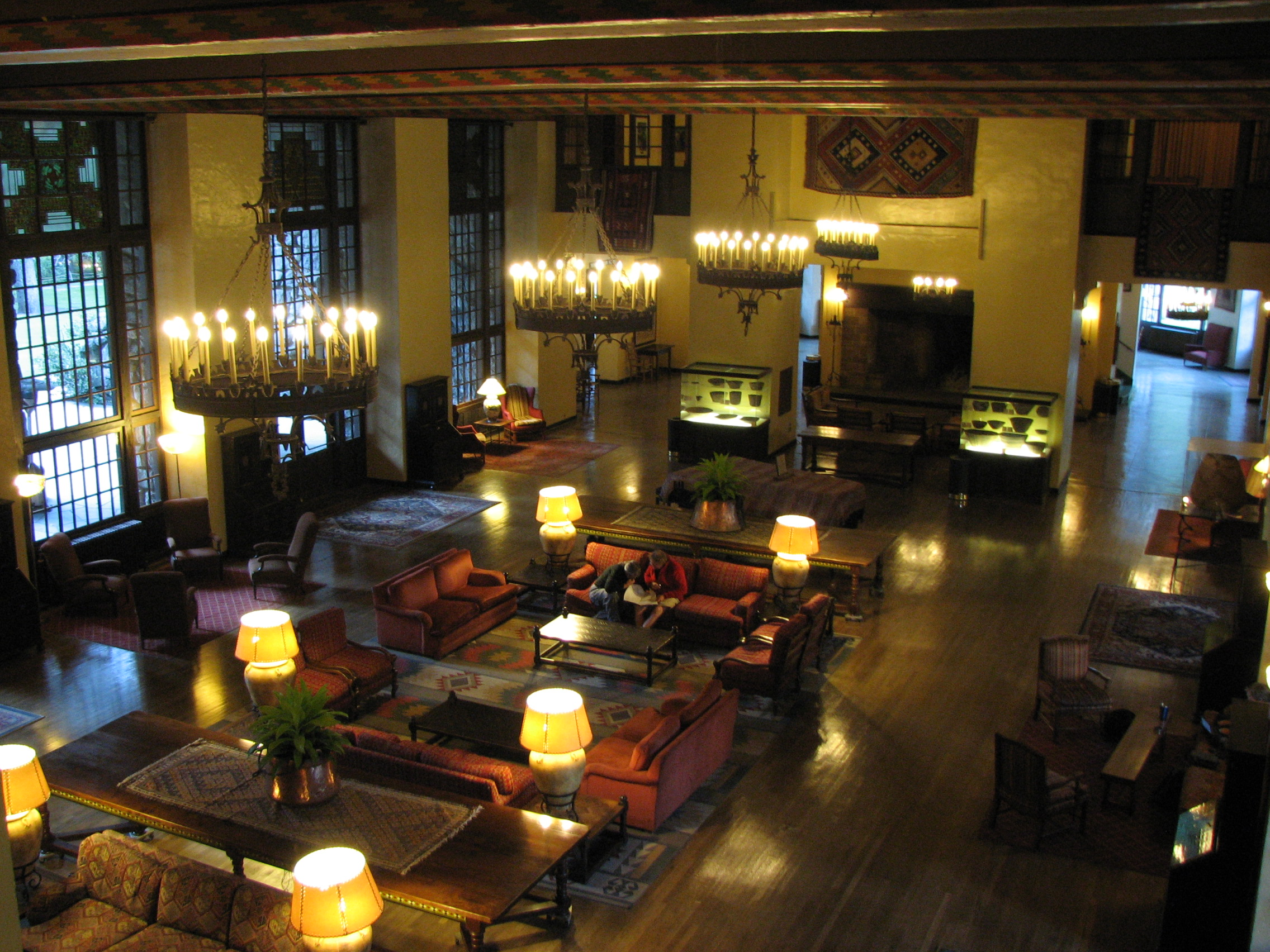
The Ahwahnee Hotel's Great Lounge was, in large part, the model for the Overlook Hotel's Colorado Lounge set in Elstree Studios.

==== Interior sets ====
Having chosen King's novel as a basis for his next project, and after a pre-production phase, Kubrick had sets constructed on soundstages at EMI Elstree Studios in Borehamwood, Hertfordshire, England. Some of the interior designs of the Overlook Hotel set were based on those of the Ahwahnee Hotel in Yosemite National Park. To enable him to shoot the scenes in loose chronological order, he used several stages at EMI Elstree Studios in order to make all sets available during the complete duration of production. The set for the Overlook Hotel was at the time the largest ever built at Elstree, including a life-size re-creation of the exterior of the hotel. In February 1979, the Colorado Lounge set at Elstree was badly damaged in a fire, causing a delay in the production.

==== Exterior locations ====
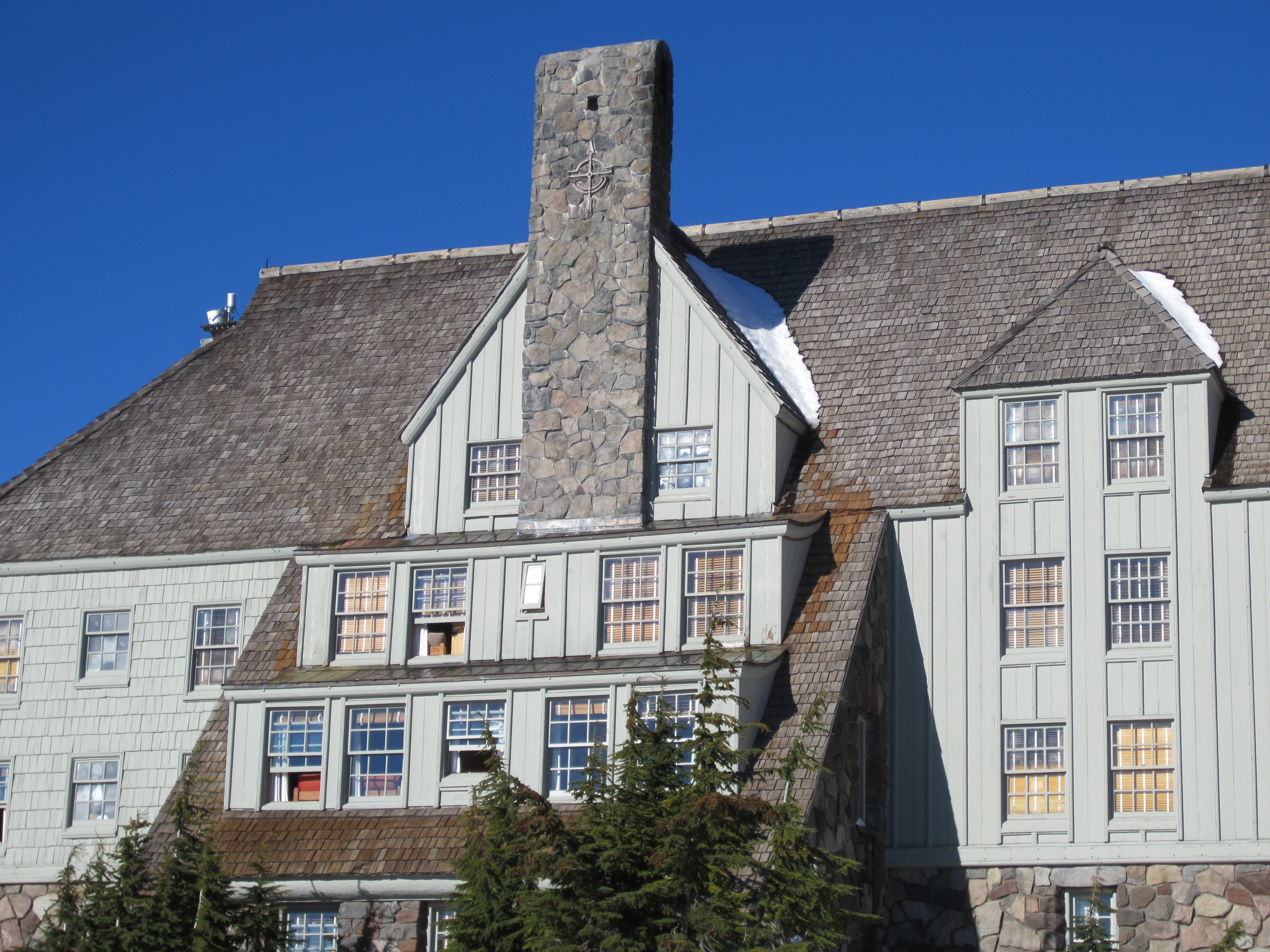
The Timberline Lodge in Oregon, which served as the exterior of the Overlook Hotel

While most of the film was shot on interior sets and the full-scale exterior facade replica at Elstree Studios, a second-unit crew headed by Jan Harlan shot some sequences on location in the American West. Saint Mary Lake and its Wild Goose Island in Glacier National Park, Montana were featured in the aerial shots of the opening scenes, with the Volkswagen Beetle driving along Going-to-the-Sun Road. The Timberline Lodge on Mount Hood in Oregon was filmed for a few of the establishing shots of the fictional Overlook Hotel; absent in these shots is the hedge maze, which the real Timberline Lodge does not have. The Ahwahnee Hotel (the Overlook Hotel's main interior reference) and the Timberline Lodge (the hotel's main exterior) were both designed by architect Gilbert Stanley Underwood, in the 1920s and 1930s respectively.

Outtakes of the opening panorama shots were later used by Ridley Scott for the closing moments of the original cut of the film Blade Runner (1982).

=== Photography ===
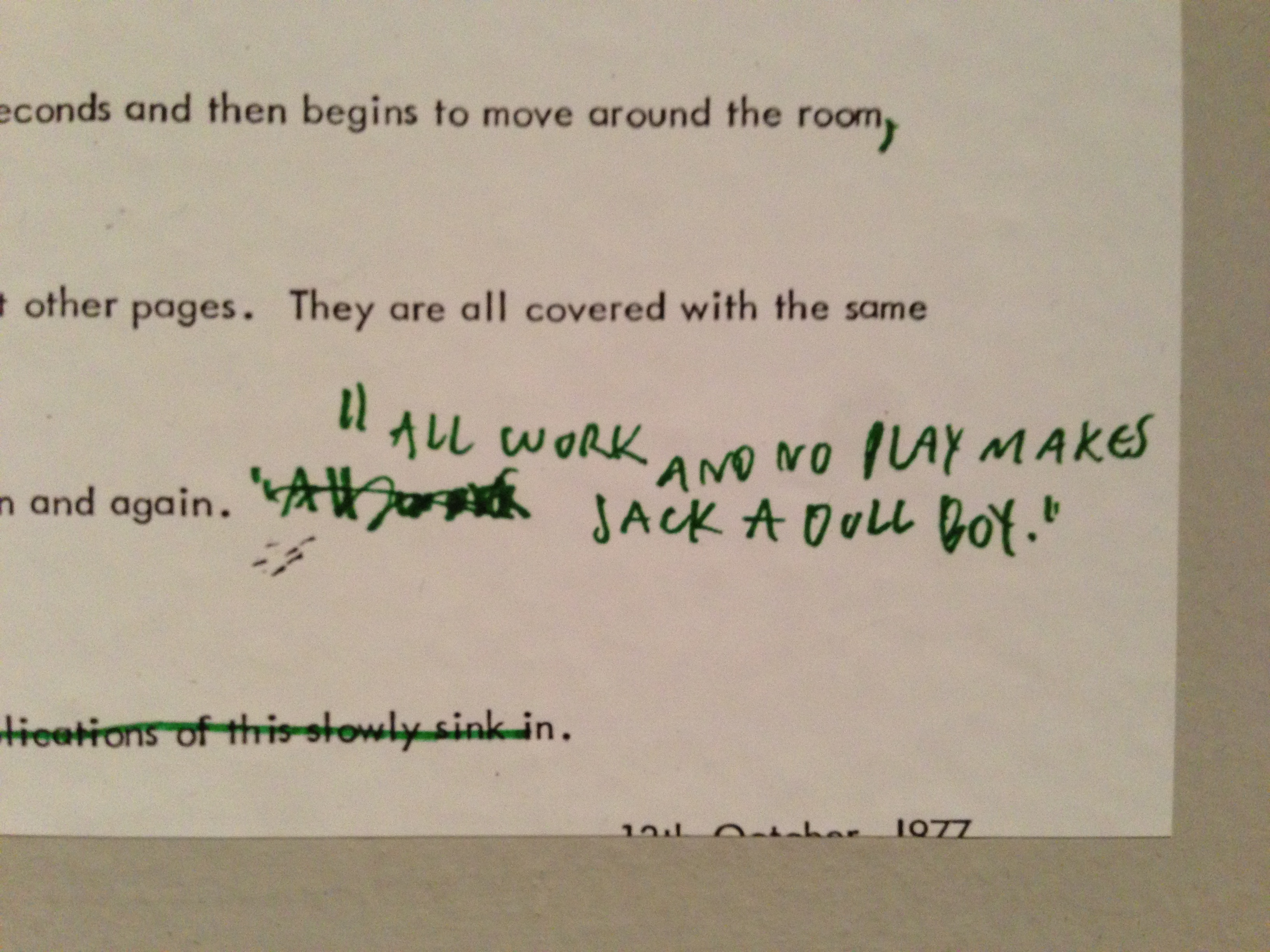
Page from The Shining screenplay highlighting the addition of the "All work and no play makes Jack a dull boy" scene

The Shining had a very prolonged and arduous production period, often with very long workdays. Principal photography took over a year to complete, due to Kubrick's highly methodical nature. Actress Shelley Duvall frequently argued with Kubrick on set about lines in the script and her acting techniques. Nicholson was living in London with his then-girlfriend Anjelica Huston and her younger sister, Allegra, who testified to his long shooting days. Joe Turkel stated in a 2014 interview that they rehearsed the "bar scene" for six weeks and that the shoot day lasted from 9 a.m. to 10:30 p.m., with Turkel recollecting that his clothes were soaked in perspiration by the end of the day's shoot. He also described it as his favorite scene in the film.

For the final Gold Room sequence, Kubrick instructed the extras (via megaphone) not to talk, "but to mime conversation to each other. Kubrick knew from years of scrutinizing thousands of films that extras could often mime their business by nodding and using large gestures that look fake. He told them to act naturally to give the scene a chilling sense of time-tripping realism as Jack walks from the seventies into the roaring twenties".

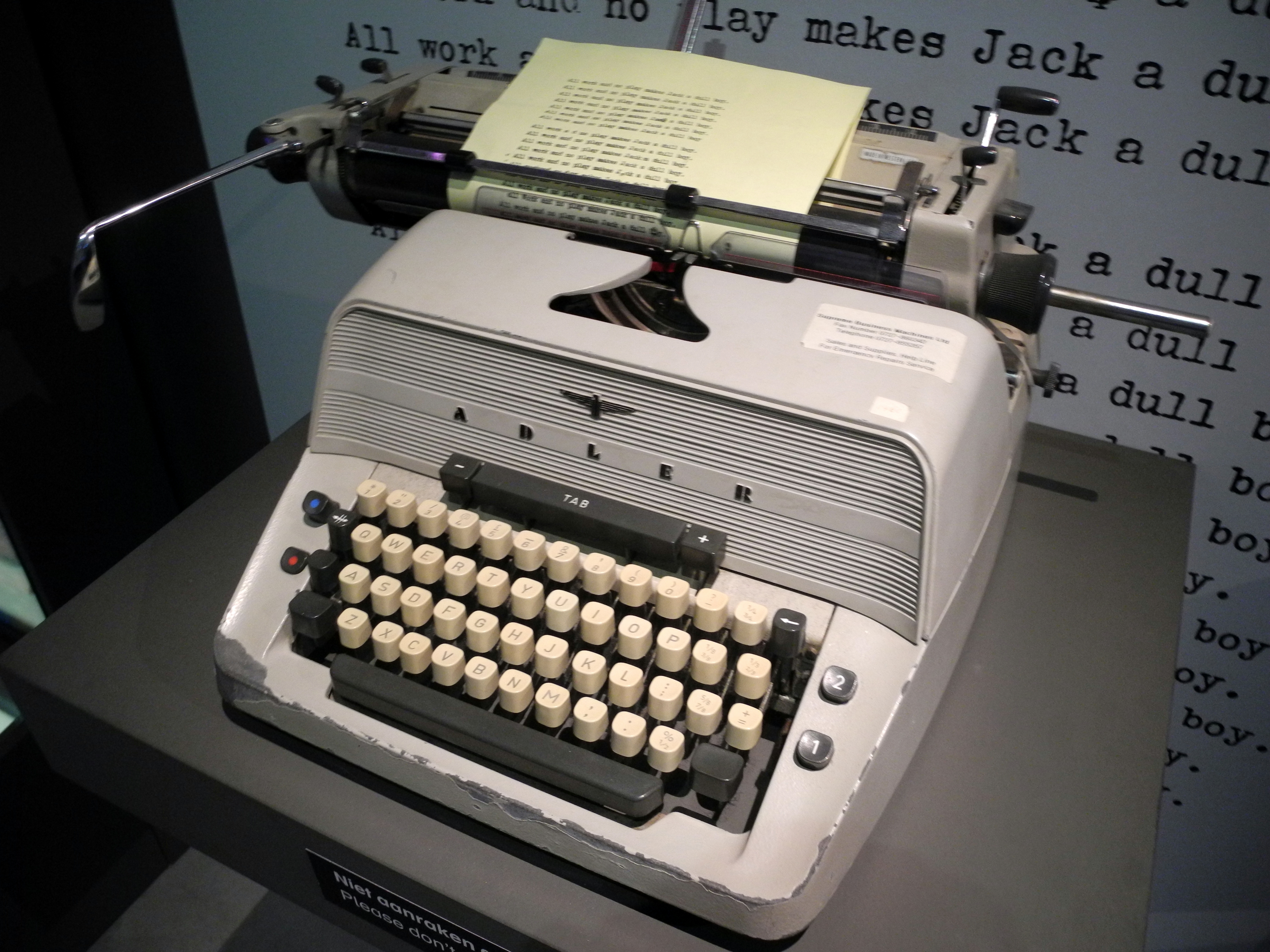
Jack's typewriter

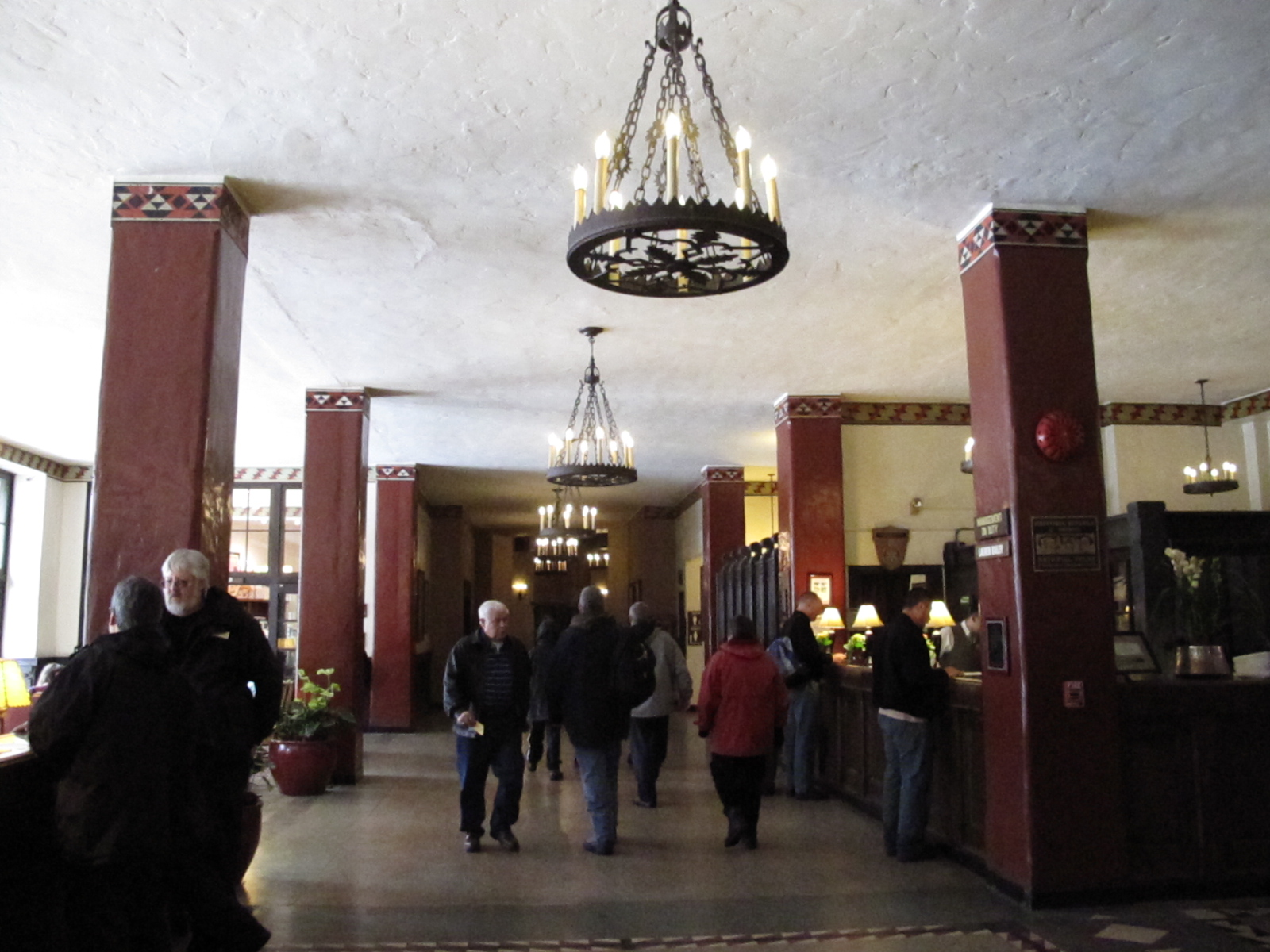
A hallway in the Ahwahnee Hotel

For the international versions of the film, Kubrick shot different takes of Wendy reading the typewriter pages containing "All work and no play makes Jack a dull boy" in different languages. For each language, a suitable idiom was used: German (Was du heute kannst besorgen, das verschiebe nicht auf Morgen / "Never put off till tomorrow what may be done today"), Italian (Il mattino ha l'oro in bocca / "The morning has gold in its mouth"), French (Un «Tiens» vaut mieux que deux «Tu l'auras» / "One 'here you go' is worth more than two 'you'll have it'", the equivalent of "A bird in the hand is worth two in the bush"), Spanish (No por mucho madrugar amanece más temprano / "No matter how early you get up, you can't make the sun rise any sooner.")

The door that Jack chops through with the axe near the end of the film was real; Kubrick originally shot this scene with a fake door, but Nicholson, who had worked as a volunteer fire marshal and a firefighter in the California Air National Guard, tore through it too quickly. Jack's line, "Heeeere's Johnny!", is taken from Ed McMahon's introduction to The Tonight Show Starring Johnny Carson, and was improvised by Nicholson. Kubrick, who had lived in England for some time, was unaware of the significance of the line, and nearly used a different take. Later that year, Carson would use this clip to open his 18th anniversary show.

On July 24, 1978, Kubrick screened David Lynch's Eraserhead (1977) to the cast and crew. He did this to convey the mood he wanted to achieve as well as to study Lynch and Alan Splet's highly regarded sound design on the independent film. George and Marcia Lucas, at Elstree for pre-production on The Empire Strikes Back, also attended this screening. According to first assistant editor Gill Smith, the event was memorable for Marcia Lucas' uproarious laughter during the entire screening of Lynch's film.

The Guinness Book of Records gave the record for the scene with the most retakes in cinematic history to the sequence where Wendy walks backward up the stairs fending off Jack with a baseball bat, at 127 times. In July 2020, Guinness updated the record to 148 takes, for the scene where Danny and Dick Hallorann discuss the ability to shine. In the film history book Stanley Kubrick's The Shining, Lee Unkrich disputes the 127 takes claim, writing, "It was reported by a crew member who wasn't even on the set when it was shot ... The shot that has the most takes in the entire film [66] that no one talks about is the big, long dolly shot that brought Jack and Wendy and the hotel manager into the Gold Ballroom at the beginning of the movie."

==== Steadicam ====
The Shining was among the early half-dozen films (after the films Bound for Glory, Marathon Man, and Rocky, all released in 1976), to use the newly developed Steadicam, a stabilizing mount for a motion picture camera, which mechanically separates the operator's movement from the camera's, allowing smooth tracking shots while the operator is moving over an uneven surface. It essentially combines the stabilized steady footage of a regular mount with the fluidity and flexibility of a handheld camera. The inventor of the Steadicam, Garrett Brown, was heavily involved with the production of The Shining. Brown has described his excitement taking his first tour of the sets, which offered "further possibilities for the Steadicam". This tour convinced Brown to become personally involved with the production. Kubrick was not "just talking of stunt shots and staircases". Rather he would use the Steadicam "as it was intended to be used — as a tool which can help get the lens where it's wanted in space and time without the classic limitations of the dolly and crane". Brown used an 18 mm Cooke lens that allowed the Steadicam to pass within an inch of walls and door frames. Brown published an article in American Cinematographer about his experience, and contributed to the audio commentary on the 2007 DVD release.

Kubrick personally aided in modifying the Steadicam's video transmission technology. Brown states his own abilities to operate the Steadicam were refined by working on Kubrick's film. For this film, Brown developed a two-handed technique, which enabled him to maintain the camera at one height while panning and tilting the camera. In addition to tracking shots from behind, the Steadicam enabled shooting in constricted rooms without flying out walls, or backing the camera into doors. Brown notes that:

One of the most talked-about shots in the picture is the eerie tracking sequence which follows Danny as he pedals at high speed through corridor after corridor on his plastic Big Wheel tricycle. The soundtrack explodes with noise when the wheel is on wooden flooring and is abruptly silent as it crosses over carpet. We needed to have the lens just a few inches from the floor and to travel rapidly just behind or ahead of the bike.

This required the Steadicam to be on a special mount resembling a wheelchair, in which the operator sat while pulling a platform with the sound man. The weight of the rig and its occupants proved to be too much for the original tires, resulting in a blowout one day that almost caused a serious crash. Solid tires were then mounted on the rig. Kubrick also had a highly accurate speedometer mounted on the rig so as to duplicate the exact tempo of a given shot so that Brown could perform successive identical takes. Brown also discusses how the scenes in the hedge maze were shot with a Steadicam.

=== Music and soundtrack ===
The stylistically modernist art-music chosen by Kubrick is similar to the repertoire he first explored in 2001: A Space Odyssey. Although the repertoire was selected by Kubrick, the process of matching passages of music to motion picture was left almost entirely at the discretion of music editor Gordon Stainforth, whose work on this film is known for attention to fine details and remarkably precise synchronization without excessive splicing.

The soundtrack album on LP was withdrawn due to problems with licensing of the music. The LP soundtrack omits some pieces heard in the film, and also includes complete versions of pieces of which only fragments are heard in the film.

The non-original music on the soundtrack is as follows:

1. Dies Irae segment from "Symphonie fantastique" by Hector Berlioz, performed by Wendy Carlos and Rachel Elkind
2. "Lontano" by György Ligeti, Ernest Bour conducting the Southwest German Radio Symphony Orchestra (Wergo Records)
3. "Music for Strings, Percussion and Celesta" by Béla Bartók, Herbert von Karajan conducting the Berlin Philharmonic Orchestra (Deutsche Grammophon)
4. "Utrenja" – excerpts from the "Ewangelia" and "Kanon Paschalny II" movements by Krzysztof Penderecki, Andrzej Markowski conducting the Warsaw National Philharmonic Orchestra (Polskie Nagrania Records)
5. "The Awakening of Jacob", "De Natura Sonoris No. 1" (the latter not on the soundtrack album, Cracow Philharmonic Orchestra conducted by Henryk Czyż) and "De Natura Sonoris No. 2" by Krzysztof Penderecki (Warsaw National Philharmonic Orchestra, conducted by Andrzej Markowski, Polskie Nagrania Records)
6. "Home", performed by Henry Hall and the Gleneagles Hotel Band. By permission of Decca Record Co. Remaster by Keith Gooden & Geoff Milne, 1977. (Decca DDV 5001/2)
7. "Midnight, the Stars and You" by Harry M. Woods, Jimmy Campbell and Reg Connelly, performed by Ray Noble and his Orchestra, vocalist Al Bowlly

Segments that did not appear on the soundtrack album also include:

1. "It's All Forgotten Now" by Ray Noble, performed by Noble and his Orchestra
2. "Masquerade", performed by Jack Hylton and his Orchestra
3. "Kanon" (for string orchestra) by Krzysztof Penderecki
4. "Polymorphia" (for string orchestra) by Krzysztof Penderecki, Cracow Philharmonic Orchestra conducted by Henryk Czyż

Upon their arrival at Elstree Studios, Wendy Carlos and Rachel Elkind were shown the first version of the film by Kubrick: "The film was a little on the long side. There were great gobs of scenes that never made it to the film. There was a whole strange and mystical scene in which Jack Nicholson discovers objects that have been arranged in his working space in the ballroom with arrows and things. He walks down and thinks he hears a voice and a ghost throws a ball back to him. None of that made it to the final film. We scored a lot of those. We didn't know what was going to be used for sure". After having something similar happen to her on A Clockwork Orange, Carlos has said that she was so disillusioned by Kubrick's actions that she vowed never to work with him again. She and Elkind had considered legal action against Kubrick, but because no formal contract was in place, they reluctantly accepted the situation. Carlos's own music was released in its near entirety in 2005 as part of her Rediscovering Lost Scores compilation.

== Release ==
Unlike Kubrick's previous works, which developed audiences gradually through word-of-mouth, The Shining initially opened on 10 screens in New York City and Los Angeles on the Memorial Day weekend, then was released as a mass-market film nationwide within a month. The European release of The Shining a few months later was 25 minutes shorter due to Kubrick's removal of most of the scenes taking place outside the environs of the hotel.

=== Post-release edit ===
After its premiere and a week into the general run (with a running time of 146 minutes), Kubrick cut a scene at the end that took place in a hospital. The scene shows Wendy in a bed talking with Mr. Ullman, who explains that Jack's body could not be found; he then gives Danny a yellow tennis ball, presumably the same one that Jack was throwing around the hotel. This scene was subsequently physically cut out of prints by projectionists and sent back to the studio by order of Warner Bros., the film's distributor. This cut the film's running time to 144 minutes. Roger Ebert commented:

If Jack did indeed freeze to death in the labyrinth, of course his body was found – and sooner rather than later, since Dick Hallorann alerted the forest rangers to serious trouble at the hotel. If Jack's body was not found, what happened to it? Was it never there? Was it absorbed into the past and does that explain Jack's presence in that final photograph of a group of hotel party-goers in 1921? Did Jack's violent pursuit of his wife and child exist entirely in Wendy's imagination, or Danny's, or theirs? ... Kubrick was wise to remove that epilogue. It pulled one rug too many out from under the story. At some level, it is necessary for us to believe the three members of the Torrance family are actually residents in the hotel during that winter, whatever happens or whatever they think happens.

The general consensus among those who saw the first few shows was that the film was better without it because keeping it would weaken the Overlook's threat to the family and reintroduce Ullman, who had barely had a leading role in the story, into the conflict. Co-writer Diane Johnson revealed that Kubrick had a certain "compassion" from the beginning for the fate of Wendy and Danny, and in that sense the hospital scene would give a sense of a return to normality. Johnson, on the other hand, was in favor of a more tragic outcome: she proposed the death of Danny Torrance. For Shelley Duvall, "Kubrick was wrong, because the scene explained some important things, such as the meaning of the yellow ball and the role that the hotel manager played in the intrigue." Kubrick decided that the film worked better without the scene.

=== European version ===
For its release in Europe, Kubrick cut about 25 minutes from the film. The excised scenes included: a longer meeting between Jack and Watson at the hotel; Danny being attended by a doctor (Anne Jackson), including references to Tony and how Jack once injured Danny in a drunken rage; more footage of Hallorann's attempts to get to the hotel during the snowstorm, including a sequence with a garage attendant (Tony Burton); extended dialogue scenes at the hotel; and a scene where Wendy discovers a group of skeletons in the hotel lobby during the climax. Jackson and Burton are credited in the European print, despite their scenes having been excised from the movie. According to Harlan, Kubrick decided to cut some sequences because the film was "not very well received", and also after Warner Brothers had complained about its ambiguity and length.

The scene when Jack writes obsessively on the typewriter "All work and no play makes Jack a dull boy" was re-shot a number of times, but changing the language of the typed copy to Italian, French, Spanish, and German, in order to match the respective dubbed languages.

Three alternative takes were used in a British television commercial.

=== Television ===
The U.S. network television premiere of The Shining (on The ABC Friday Night Movie of May 6, 1983) started with a placard saying, "Tonight's Film Deals With the Supernatural, As a Possessed Man Attempts to Destroy His Family." With the movie's ambiguities, it is not known how Kubrick felt about or if he agreed with this proclamation. The placard also said that the film was edited for television and warned about the content. As the film's shots were composed with eventual television broadcast in mind, the version broadcast on ABC in 1983 was simply an open matte of the film released in theaters at 1.85:1.

=== Home media ===
The following table summarizes the home media release history of The Shining. Its data are drawn from Jonathan Rinzler and Lee Unkrich's 2023 book Stanley Kubrick's The Shining.

Territory	Released	Publisher	Aspect Ratio	Runtime	Commentaries	Mix	Resolution	HDR	Master	Medium
USA	2019	Warner Home Video	1.78:1	144 min	Garrett Brown and John Baxter; Vivian Kubrick documentary	5.1 stereo remix	2160p	Yes	8k	Blu-ray
USA	2011	Warner Home Video	1.78:1	144 min	Garrett Brown and John Baxter; Vivian Kubrick documentary	5.1 stereo remix	1080p	No	4k	Blu-ray (Stanley Kubrick: Limited Edition Collection)
USA	2007	Warner Home Video	1.78:1	144 min	Garrett Brown and John Baxter; Vivian Kubrick documentary	5.1 stereo remix	1080p	No	2k	Blu-ray (two discs)
USA	2007	Warner Home Video	1.78:1	144 min	Garrett Brown and John Baxter; Vivian Kubrick documentary	5.1 stereo remix	480i	No	2k	DVD re-release (two discs)
USA	2001	Warner Home Video	1.33:1	144 min	none	5.1 stereo remix	480i	No	2k	DVD re-release
USA	1999	Warner Home Video	1.33:1	144 min	none	Original mono	480i	No	2k	DVD
USA	1999/2001	Warner Home Video	1.33:1	144 min	none	Original mono	240 lines	No	1k	VHS (The Stanley Kubrick Collection)
USA	1991	Warner Home Video	1.33:1	144 min	none	Original mono	240 lines	No	NTSC	VHS
USA	1991	Warner Home Video	1.33:1	144 min	none	Original mono	425 lines	No	NTSC	LaserDisc re-release
USA	1986	Warner Home Video	1.33:1	144 min	none	Original mono	240 lines	No	NTSC	VHS
USA	1985	Warner Home Video	1.33:1	144 min	none	Original mono	425 lines	No	NTSC	LaserDisc
USA	1983	ABC	1.33:1	c. 139 min	none	Original mono	525 lines	No	NTSC	First television broadcast
USA	1981	Warner Home Video	1.33:1	144 min	none	Original mono	240 lines	No	NTSC	VHS
USA	1981	Warner Home Video	1.33:1	144 min	none	Original mono	250 lines	No	NTSC	Betamax

The film was released on DVD in 1999, featuring a 4:3 open matte aspect ratio and a 5.1 audio track up-mixed from the original mono soundtrack. The DVD also contains a candid fly-on-the-wall 33-minute documentary made by Kubrick's daughter Vivian (who was 17 when she filmed it) entitled Making The Shining, originally shown on British television in 1980. She also provided an audio commentary track about her documentary for its DVD release. It appears even on pre-2007 editions of The Shining on DVD, although most DVDs of Kubrick films before then were devoid of documentaries or audio commentaries. It has some candid interviews and very private moments caught on set, such as arguments with cast and director, moments of a no-nonsense Kubrick directing his actors, Scatman Crothers being overwhelmed with emotion during his interview, Shelley Duvall collapsing from exhaustion on the set, and Jack Nicholson enjoying playing up to the behind-the-scenes camera.

The film was released on Blu-ray in 2007 in a 1.85:1 aspect ratio. It was released on Ultra HD Blu-ray and a remastered Blu-ray in October 2019. The release includes a 4K remaster using a scan of the original 35 mm negative. Filmmaker Steven Spielberg and Kubrick's former personal assistant Leon Vitali closely assisted Warner Bros. in the mastering process. This is the same cut and 4K restoration that was screened at the 2019 Cannes Film Festival. According to the official press release, the official full-length run-time is 146 minutes. Despite this claim all actually released home media versions in the US have been a 2-hour, 23-minute and 46-second cut (c. 144 minutes).

In 2024, the Stanley Kubrick Film Archive released the short documentary Shine On – The Forgotten Shining Location on the official Stanley Kubrick YouTube channel. Narrated by Michael Sheen and directed by Paul King, the film looks at how Kubrick took over Elstree Studios for a whole year whilst filming The Shining. Executive producer Jan Harlan, art director Les Tomkins and Kubrick's daughter Katharina Kubrick, assigned the role of location's researcher on the film, revisit the studio locations and share their memories about the film. Film critic Owen Gleiberman wrote in Variety: "Shine On is a featurette that devotes itself to the physical production of The Shining — that is, to the film's sets, a few of which, in the form of industrial rooms that were doubling as movie locations, still exist. So Shine On is a movie about the shell of The Shining. But that shell is really the most unnerving thing about The Shining."

In 2026 it was announced that The Shining was to be released by the Criterion Collection alongside Kubrick's entire filmography as part of a special 4K UHD Blu-Ray box set titled The Complete Kubrick. This release will feature both the U.S. theatrical cut and international cut both restored in 4K and presented together for the first time ever on home video. This release also includes a 4K restoration of Vivian Kubrick's Making "The Shining" documentary alongside new supplements. The set is due to be released in October 2026.

=== Ad campaigns ===
Original red and final yellow versions of Saul Bass's theatrical poster for the film.

Various theatrical posters were used during the original 1980–1981 international release cycle, but in the U.S., where the film first opened, the primary poster and newspaper advert was designed by noted Hollywood graphic designer Saul Bass. Bass and Kubrick reportedly went through over 300 potential designs before settling on the final design of an unsettling, angry-looking, underlit, pointillistic doll-like face (which does not appear in the film) peering through the letters "The", with "SHiNiNG" below, in smaller letters. At the top of the poster are the words "A MASTERPIECE OF MODERN HORROR", with the credits and other information at the bottom.

The correspondence between the two men during the design process survives, including Kubrick's handwritten critiques on Bass's different proposed designs. Bass originally intended the poster to be black on a red background, but Kubrick, to Bass's dismay, chose to make the background yellow. In response, Bass commissioned a small, silkscreened print run of his original version, which also lacks the "masterpiece of modern horror" slogan, and has the credits in a compact white block at the bottom.

=== 4K version ===
Turner Classic Movies and Fathom Events had a limited screening in October 2016 in 2K and 4K resolution.

In April 2019, a 4K resolution remastered version from a new scan of the original 35 mm camera negative of the film was selected to be shown in the Cannes Classics section at the 2019 Cannes Film Festival. The length is listed as 146 minutes and 143 minutes.

== Reception ==
=== Box office ===
The Shining opened on the same weekend as The Empire Strikes Back but was released on 10 screens and grossed $622,337 for the four-day weekend, the third highest-grossing opening weekend from fewer than 50 screens of all time, behind Star Wars (1977) and The Rose (1979). It had a per-screen average gross of $62,234 compared to $50,919 for The Empire Strikes Back from 126 screens.

=== Initial reviews ===
The film had mixed reviews at the time of its opening in the United States. Audiences polled by CinemaScore gave the film an average grade of "C+" on an A+ to F scale. Janet Maslin of The New York Times lauded Nicholson's performance and praised the Overlook Hotel as an effective setting for horror, but wrote that "the supernatural story knows frustratingly little rhyme or reason ... Even the film's most startling horrific images seem overbearing and perhaps even irrelevant." Variety was critical, stating "With everything to work with ... Kubrick has teamed with jumpy Jack Nicholson to destroy all that was so terrifying about Stephen King's bestseller." A common initial criticism was the slow pacing, which was highly atypical of horror films of the time.

Neither Gene Siskel nor Roger Ebert reviewed the film on their television show Sneak Previews when it was first released, but in his review for the Chicago Sun-Times, Ebert complained that it was hard to connect with any of the characters. In his Chicago Tribune review, Siskel gave the film two stars out of four and called it "a crashing disappointment. The biggest surprise is that it contains virtually no thrills. Given Kubrick's world-class reputation, one's immediate reaction is that maybe he was after something other than thrills in the film. If so, it's hard to figure out what." Vincent Misiano's review in Ares magazine concluded: "The Shining lays open to view all the devices of horror and suspense – endless eerie music, odd camera angles, a soundtrack of interminably pounding heart, hatchets and hunts. The result is shallow, self-conscious and dull. Read the book."

Kevin Thomas of the Los Angeles Times wrote "There are moments so visually stunning only a Kubrick could pull them off, yet the film is too grandiose to be the jolter that horror pictures are expected to be. Both those expecting significance from Kubrick and those merely looking for a good scare may be equally disappointed." Pauline Kael of The New Yorker stated "Again and again, the movie leads us to expect something – almost promises it – and then disappoints us." Gary Arnold of The Washington Post wrote "Stanley Kubrick's production of The Shining, a ponderous, lackluster distillation of Stephen King's best-selling novel, looms as the Big Letdown of the new film season. I can't recall a more elaborately ineffective scare movie." Stanley Kauffmann of The New Republic described The Shining as "laborious filmmaking" and "a grab bag of spook stuff, with no rhyme or reason of its own" and that Nicholson's "mouthy work here makes the late Bela Lugosi look conservative".

It was one of two films of Kubrick's last eleven films, the other being Eyes Wide Shut, to receive no nominations from the BAFTAs. It was the only one of Kubrick's last nine films to receive no nominations from either the Oscars or Golden Globes. Instead, it was Kubrick's only film to be nominated at the Razzie Awards, including Worst Director and Worst Actress (Duvall), in the first year that award was given. These nominations, especially Duvall's, have provoked backlash and controversy for years, with Razzies founder John J. B. Wilson defending his choice claiming he expected the adaptation to be more similar to the book. Razzies co-founder Maureen Murphy stated in 2022 that she regretted giving Duvall the Worst Actress nomination. On March 31, 2022, the Razzie committee officially rescinded Duvall's nomination, stating "We have since discovered that Duvall's performance was impacted by Stanley Kubrick's treatment of her throughout the production."

=== Reappraisal ===
According to Rotten Tomatoes, 75% of 177 critics gave the film a positive review, with an average rating of 8.6/10. The site's critical consensus reads: "Though it deviates from Stephen King's novel, Stanley Kubrick's The Shining is a chilling, often baroque journey into madness – exemplified by an unforgettable turn from Jack Nicholson." On Metacritic, it has a weighted average score of 68 out of 100 based on reviews from 26 critics, indicating "generally favorable reviews". Tim Cahill of Rolling Stone noted in an interview with Kubrick that by 1987 there was already a "critical re-evaluation of [The Shining] in process".

In 2001, the film was ranked 29th on AFI's 100 Years...100 Thrills list and Jack Torrance was named the 25th greatest villain on the AFI's 100 Years...100 Heroes and Villains list in 2003. In 2005, the quote "Here's Johnny!" was ranked 68 on AFI's 100 Years...100 Movie Quotes list. It had Channel 4's all-time scariest moment, and Bravo TV named one of the film's scenes sixth on their list of the 100 Scariest Movie Moments. Film critics Kim Newman and Jonathan Romney both placed it in their top ten lists for the 2002 Sight & Sound poll. In 2005, Total Film ranked The Shining as the 5th-greatest horror film of all time. In 2012, Sight & Sound directors' poll ranked it the 75th greatest film of all time. Director Martin Scorsese placed it on his list of the 11 scariest horror films of all time. Mathematicians at King's College London (KCL) used statistical modeling in a study commissioned by Sky Movies to conclude that The Shining was the "perfect scary movie" due to a proper balance of various ingredients including shock value, suspense, gore and size of the cast.

In 2010, The Guardian newspaper ranked it as the fifth "best horror film of all time". It was voted the 62nd greatest American film ever made in a 2015 poll conducted by BBC. In 2016, the Directors Guild of America included the film in its list of The 80 Best-Directed Films since the Guild’s founding in 1936. In 2017, Empire magazine's readers' poll ranked the film at number 35 on its list of "The 100 Greatest Movies", and in 2023, Empire also ranked it number one on its list of "The 50 Best Horror Movies". In 2021, the film was ranked at number two by Time Out on their list of "The 100 Best Horror Movies". Critics, scholars, and crew members (such as Kubrick's producer Jan Harlan) have discussed the film's enormous influence on popular culture. In 2006, Roger Ebert, who was initially critical of the work, inducted the film into his Great Movies series, saying "Stanley Kubrick's cold and frightening The Shining challenges us to decide: Who is the reliable observer? Whose idea of events can we trust? ... It is this elusive open-endedness that makes Kubrick's film so strangely disturbing."

Anne Billson of The Guardian stated that "Duvall's horrified reactions as her husband reveals himself to be a mortal threat provide the film with many of its iconic moments." Bilge Ebiri of Vulture wrote: "Looking into Duvall's huge eyes from the front row of a theater, I found myself riveted by a very poignant form of fear. Not the fear of an actor out of her element, or the more mundane fear of a victim being chased around by an ax-wielding maniac. Rather, it was something far more disquieting, and familiar: the fear of a wife who's experienced her husband at his worst, and is terrified that she'll experience it again." Jessica Jalali of Screen Rant ranked it the best performance of her career, calling her "the heart of the film; she is out of her depth in dealing with her husband's looming insanity while trying to protect her young son, all while being fearful of the malevolence around her". Tim Grierson of RogerEbert.com similarly called it one of her best performances, writing that "This is no simple 'scream queen' performance as Duvall makes Wendy's terror and determination grippingly, movingly real. Did Kubrick push her to extremes to reach such heights? Perhaps, but the accomplishment is Duvall's, full stop."

Horror film critic Peter Bracke, reviewing the Blu-ray release in High-Def Digest, wrote:

Just as the ghostly apparitions of the film's fictional Overlook Hotel would play tricks on the mind of poor Jack Torrance, so too has the passage of time changed the perception of The Shining itself. Many of the same reviewers who lambasted the film for "not being scary" enough back in 1980 now rank it among the most effective horror films ever made, while audiences who hated the film back then now vividly recall being "terrified" by the experience. The Shining has somehow risen from the ashes of its own bad press to redefine itself not only as a seminal work of the genre, but perhaps the most stately, artful horror ever made.

In 1999, Jonathan Romney discussed Kubrick's perfectionism and dispelled others' initial arguments that the film lacked complexity: "The final scene alone demonstrates what a rich source of perplexity The Shining offers ... look beyond the simplicity and the Overlook reveals itself as a palace of paradox". Romney further explains:

The dominating presence of the Overlook Hotel – designed by Roy Walker as a composite of American hotels visited in the course of research – is an extraordinary vindication of the value of mise en scène. It's a real, complex space that we don't just see but come to virtually inhabit. The confinement is palpable: horror cinema is an art of claustrophobia, making us loath to stay in the cinema but unable to leave. Yet it's combined with a sort of agoraphobia – we are as frightened of the hotel's cavernous vastness as of its corridors' enclosure ... The film sets up a complex dynamic between simple domesticity and magnificent grandeur, between the supernatural and the mundane in which the viewer is disoriented by the combination of spaciousness and confinement, and an uncertainty as to just what is real or not.

=== Response by Stephen King ===
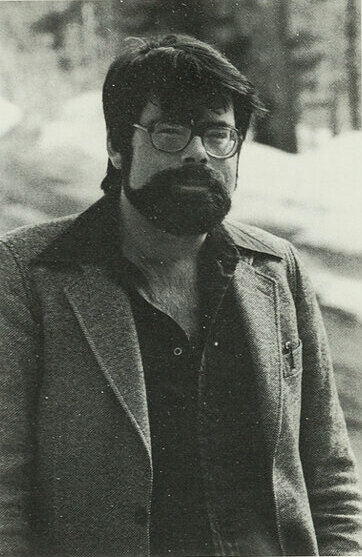
Author Stephen King (photographed c. 1980) was an executive producer for a more faithful 1997 adaptation, and continues to hold mixed feelings regarding Kubrick's version.

Stephen King has been quoted as saying that although Kubrick made a film with memorable imagery, it was poor as an adaptation and that it is the only adaptation of his novels that he could "remember hating". In his 1981 nonfiction book Danse Macabre, he noted that Kubrick was among those "filmmakers whose particular visions are so clear and fierce that ... fear of failure never becomes a factor in the equation," commenting that "even when a director such as Stanley Kubrick makes such a maddening, perverse, and disappointing film as The Shining, it somehow retains a brilliance that is inarguable; it is simply there," and listed Kubrick's film among those he considered to have "contributed something of value to the [horror] genre." Before the 1980 film, King often said he gave little attention to the film adaptations of his work.

The novel, written while King was suffering from alcoholism, contains an autobiographical element. King expressed disappointment that some themes, such as the disintegration of family and the dangers of alcoholism, are less present in the film. King also viewed the casting of Nicholson as a mistake, arguing it would result in a rapid realization among audiences that Jack would go insane, due to Nicholson's famous role as Randle McMurphy in One Flew Over the Cuckoo's Nest (1975). King had suggested that a more "everyman" actor such as Jon Voight, Christopher Reeve, or Michael Moriarty play the role, so that Jack's descent into madness would be more unnerving. In the novel, the story takes the child's point of view, while in the film the father is the main character; in fact, one of the most notable differences lies in Jack Torrance's psychological profile. According to the novel, the character represented an ordinary and balanced man who little by little loses control; furthermore, the written narration reflected personal traits of the author himself at that time (marked by insomnia and alcoholism), in addition to abuse. There is some allusion to these episodes in the American version of the film.

In an interview with the BBC, King criticized Kubrick's Wendy, stating that she is "basically just there to scream and be stupid, and that's not the woman that I wrote about." King's Wendy is a strong and independent woman on a professional and emotional level; to Kubrick, on the other hand, it did not seem consistent that such a woman had long endured the personality of Jack Torrance.

King once suggested that he disliked the film's downplaying of the supernatural; King had envisioned Jack as a victim of the genuinely external forces haunting the hotel, whereas King felt Kubrick had viewed the haunting and its resulting malignancy as coming from within Jack himself. In October 2013, journalist Laura Miller wrote that the discrepancy between the two was almost the complete opposite:

King is, essentially, a novelist of morality. The decisions his characters make – whether it's to confront a pack of vampires or to break 10 years of sobriety – are what matter to him. But in Kubrick's The Shining, the characters are largely in the grip of forces beyond their control. It's a film in which domestic violence occurs, while King's novel is about domestic violence as a choice certain men make when they refuse to abandon a delusional, defensive entitlement. As King sees it, Kubrick treats his characters like "insects" because the director doesn't really consider them capable of shaping their own fates. Everything they do is subordinate to an overweening, irresistible force, which is Kubrick's highly developed aesthetic; they are its slaves. In King's The Shining, the monster is Jack. In Kubrick's, the monster is Kubrick.

King later criticized the film and Kubrick as a director:

Parts of the film are chilling, charged with a relentlessly claustrophobic terror, but others fall flat. Not that religion has to be involved in horror, but a visceral skeptic such as Kubrick just couldn't grasp the sheer inhuman evil of the Overlook Hotel. So he looked, instead, for evil in the characters and made the film into a domestic tragedy with only vaguely supernatural overtones. That was the basic flaw: because he couldn't believe, he couldn't make the film believable to others. What's basically wrong with Kubrick's version of The Shining is that it's a film by a man who thinks too much and feels too little; and that's why, for all its virtuoso effects, it never gets you by the throat and hangs on the way real horror should.

King was disappointed by Kubrick's decision not to film at The Stanley Hotel in Estes Park, Colorado, which inspired the story (a decision Kubrick made since the hotel lacked sufficient snow and electricity). He supervised the 1997 television adaptation, also titled The Shining, filmed at The Stanley Hotel.

During an interview segment on the Bravo channel, King stated that the first time he watched Kubrick's adaptation, he found it to be "dreadfully unsettling". Writing in the afterword of Doctor Sleep, King said of the film "of course there was Stanley Kubrick's movie which many seem to remember – for reasons I have never quite understood – as one of the scariest films they have ever seen. If you have seen the movie but not read the novel, you should note that Doctor Sleep follows the latter which is, in my opinion, the True History of the Torrance Family."

Mike Flanagan, director of the film adaptation of Doctor Sleep, would reconcile the differences between novel and film versions of The Shining there. Doctor Sleep is a direct adaptation of its novel counterpart, which itself is a sequel to the novel version of The Shining, but is also a continuation of Kubrick's film; in explaining the latter, Flanagan expressed, "The Shining is so ubiquitous and has burned itself into the collective imagination of people who love cinema in a way that so few movies have. There's no other language to tell that story in. If you say 'Overlook Hotel', I see something. It lives right up in my brain because of Stanley Kubrick. You can't pretend that isn't the case". King initially rejected Flanagan's pitch of bringing back the Overlook as seen in Kubrick's film, but changed his mind after Flanagan pitched a scene within the hotel near the end of the film that served as his reason to bring back the Overlook. Upon reading the script, King was so satisfied with the result that he said, "Everything that I ever disliked about the Kubrick version of The Shining is redeemed for me here."

=== Awards and nominations ===
Awards and nominations
Award	Category	Nominee	Result
Razzie Award	Worst Actress	Shelley Duvall (rescinded) (Note: Rescinded on March 31, 2022.)	Nominated
Razzie Award	Worst Director	Stanley Kubrick	Nominated
Saturn Award	Best Director	Stanley Kubrick	Nominated
Saturn Award	Best Supporting Actor	Scatman Crothers	Won
Saturn Award	Best Horror Film		Nominated
Saturn Award	Best Music	Béla Bartók	Nominated

=== American Film Institute recognition ===
- 2001: AFI's 100 Years...100 Thrills – #29
- 2003: AFI's 100 Years...100 Heroes & Villains:
  - Jack Torrance – #25 Villain
- 2005: AFI's 100 Years...100 Movie Quotes:
  - "Here's Johnny!" – #68

== Comparison with the novel ==
The film differs from the novel significantly with regard to characterization and motivation of action. The most obvious differences are those regarding the personality of Jack Torrance (the source of much of author Stephen King's dissatisfaction with the film).

=== Motivation of ghosts ===
In the film, the motive of the ghosts is apparently to "reclaim" Jack (although Grady expresses an interest in Danny's "shining" ability), who seems to be a reincarnation of a previous caretaker of the hotel, as suggested by the 1920s photograph of Jack at the end of the film and Jack's repeated claims to have "not just a déjà vu". The film is more focused on Jack (as opposed to Danny) than the novel.

=== Room number ===
The room number 217 has been changed to 237. Timberline Lodge, located on Mount Hood in Oregon, was used for the aerial exterior shots of the fictional Overlook Hotel. The Lodge requested that Kubrick not depict Room 217 (featured in the book) in The Shining, because future guests at the Lodge might be afraid to stay there, and a nonexistent room, 237, was substituted in the film. Contrary to the hotel's expectations, Room 217 is requested more often than any other room at Timberline.

There are fringe analyses relating this number change to rumors that Kubrick faked the first Moon landing, as there are approximately 237,000 miles between the Earth and the Moon (average is 238,855 miles), and claiming that the film is a subtle confession of his involvement. Another theory posits an obsession with the number 42 in the film, and the product of the digits in 237 is 42.

=== Jack Torrance ===
The novel initially presents Jack as likable and well-intentioned, yet haunted by the demons of alcohol and authority issues. Nonetheless, he becomes gradually overwhelmed by what he sees as the evil forces in the hotel. At the novel's conclusion, it is suggested that the evil hotel forces have possessed Jack's body and proceeded to destroy all that is left of his mind during a final showdown with Danny. He leaves a monstrous entity that Danny is able to divert while he, Wendy and Dick Hallorann escape. The film's Jack is established as somewhat sinister much earlier in the story and dies in a different manner. Jack kills Dick Hallorann in the film, but only wounds him in the novel. King attempted to talk Stanley Kubrick out of casting Jack Nicholson even before filming began, on the grounds that he seemed vaguely sinister from the very beginning of the film. (Note: King discusses this in an interview he gave at the time of the TV remake of The Shining in the New York Daily News.)

Only in the novel does Jack hear the haunting, heavy-handed voice of his father, with whom he had a troubled relationship. In both media, Jack's encounter with the ghostly bartender is pivotal to his deterioration. The novel gives much more detail about his alcoholism.

The film prolongs Jack's struggle with writer's block. Kubrick's co-screenwriter Diane Johnson believes that in King's novel, Jack's discovery of the scrapbook of clippings in the boiler room of the hotel, which gives him new ideas for a novel, catalyzes his possession by the ghosts of the hotel, while at the same time unblocking his writing. Jack is no longer a blocked writer, but now filled with energy. In her contribution to the screenplay, Johnson wrote an adaptation of this scene, which to her regret Kubrick later excised, as she felt this left the father's change less motivated. Kubrick showed Jack's continued blockage quite late in the film with the "all work and no play makes Jack a dull boy" scene, which does not appear in the novel.

Stephen King stated on the DVD commentary of the 1997 miniseries of The Shining that the character of Jack Torrance was partially autobiographical, as he was struggling with both alcoholism and unprovoked rage toward his family at the time of writing. Tony Magistrale wrote about Kubrick's version of Jack Torrance in Hollywood's Stephen King:

Kubrick's version of Torrance is much closer to the tyrannical Hal (from Kubrick's 2001: A Space Odyssey) and Alex (from Kubrick's A Clockwork Orange) than he is to King's more conflicted, more sympathetically human characterization.

From Thomas Allen Nelson's Kubrick: Inside a Film Artist's Maze: "When Jack moves through the reception area on his way to a 'shining' over the model maze, he throws a yellow tennis ball past a stuffed bear and Danny's Big Wheel, which rests on the very spot (a Navajo circle design) where Hallorann will be murdered." Jack's tennis ball mysteriously rolls into Danny's circle of toy cars just before the boy walks through the open door of Room 237.

In the film's opening, the camera from above moves over water and through mountains with the ease of a bird in flight. Below, on a winding mountain road, Jack's diminutive yellow Volkswagen journeys through a tree-lined maze, resembling one of Danny's toy cars or the yellow tennis ball seen later outside of Room 237.

=== Danny Torrance ===
Danny Torrance is considerably more open about his supernatural abilities in the novel, discussing them with strangers such as his doctor. In the film, he is quite secretive about them even with his prime mentor Dick Hallorann, who also has these abilities. The same is true of Dick Hallorann, who in his journey back to the Overlook in the book, talks with others with the "shining" ability, while in the film he lies about his reason for returning to the Overlook. Danny in the novel is generally portrayed as unusually intelligent across the board. In the film, he is more ordinary, though with a preternatural gift.

Although Danny has supernatural powers in both versions, the novel makes it clear that his apparent imaginary friend "Tony" really is a projection of hidden parts of his own psyche, though heavily amplified by Danny's psychic "shining" abilities. At the end it is revealed that Danny Torrance's middle name is "Anthony".

=== Wendy Torrance ===
Wendy Torrance in the film is relatively meek, submissive, passive, gentle, and mousy; this is shown by the way she defends Jack even in his absence to the doctor examining Danny. In the novel, she is a far more self-reliant and independent personality, who is tied to Jack in part by her poor relationship with her parents. In the novel, she never displays hysteria or collapses the way she does in the film, but remains cool and self-reliant. Writing in Hollywood's Stephen King, author Tony Magistrale writes about the mini-series remake:

[Rebecca] De Mornay restores much of the steely resilience found in the protagonist of King's novel and this is particularly noteworthy when compared to Shelley Duvall's exaggerated portrayal of Wendy as Olive Oyl revisited: A simpering fatality of forces beyond her capacity to understand, much less surmount.

Co-screenwriter Diane Johnson stated that in her contributions to the script, Wendy had more dialogue, and believes that Kubrick cut many of her lines due to his dissatisfaction with Duvall's delivery. Johnson believes that the earlier draft of the script portrayed Wendy as a more rounded character. The "Wendy Theory" claims that Kubrick made Wendy, not Jack, the psychotic character. Shifts in continuity and camera placement are said to represent Wendy's delusional perspective.

=== Stuart Ullman ===
In the novel, Jack's interviewer, Ullman, is highly authoritarian, a kind of snobbish martinet. The film's Ullman is far more humane and concerned about Jack's well-being, as well as smooth and self-assured. Only in the novel does Ullman state that he disapproves of hiring Jack but higher authorities have asked that Jack be hired. Ullman's bossy nature in the novel is one of the first steps in Jack's deterioration, whereas in the film, Ullman serves largely as an expositor.

In Stanley Kubrick and the Art of Adaptation, author Greg Jenkins writes "A toadish figure in the book, Ullman has been utterly reinvented for the film; he now radiates charm, grace and gentility."

From Kubrick: Inside a Film Artist's Maze: Ullman tells Jack that the hotel's season runs from May 15 to October 30, meaning that the Torrances moved in on Halloween (October 31). On Ullmann's desk next to a small American flag sits a metal cup containing pencils and a pen – and a miniature replica of an ax.

"When Ullman, himself all smiles, relates as a footnote the story about the former caretaker who 'seemed perfectly normal' but nevertheless cut up his family with an ax, Jack's obvious interest (as if he's recalling one of his own nightmares) and his insincere congeniality (early signs of a personality malfunction) lead the viewer to believe that the film's definition of his madness will be far more complex."

=== Family dynamics ===
Stephen King provides the reader with a great deal of information about the stress in the Torrance family early in the story, including revelations of Jack's physical abuse of Danny and Wendy's fear of Danny's mysterious spells. Kubrick tones down the early family tension and reveals family disharmony much more gradually than King does. In the film, Danny has a stronger emotional bond with Wendy than with Jack, which fuels Jack's rather paranoid notion that the two are conspiring against him. The exact opposite is true in the book, where Wendy occasionally experiences jealousy at the fact that Danny clearly prefers Jack to her.

=== Plot differences ===
In the novel Jack recovers his sanity and goodwill through the intervention of Danny; this does not occur in the film. Writing in Cinefantastique magazine, Frederick Clarke suggests, "Instead of playing a normal man who becomes insane, Nicholson portrays a crazy man attempting to remain sane." In the novel, Jack's final act is to enable Wendy and Danny to escape the hotel before it explodes due to a defective boiler, killing him. The film ends with the hotel still standing. More broadly, the defective boiler is a major element of the novel's plot, entirely missing from the film version.

Because of the limitations of special effects at the time, the living topiary animals of the novel were omitted and a hedge maze was added, acting as a final trap for Jack Torrance as well as a refuge for Danny.

In the film, the hotel possibly derives its malevolent energy from being built on a Native American burial ground. In the novel, the reason for the hotel's manifestation of evil is possibly explained by a theme present in King's 1975 novel 'Salem's Lot as well as Shirley Jackson's 1959 novel The Haunting of Hill House: a physical place may absorb the evils that transpire there and manifest them as a vaguely sentient malevolence. The film's Hallorann speaks to Danny about that phenomenon occurring at the Overlook. In the novel, Jack does a great deal of investigation of the hotel's past through a scrapbook, a subplot almost omitted from the film aside from two touches: a brief appearance of the scrapbook beside the typewriter, and Jack's statement to the ghost of Grady that he knows his face from an old newspaper article describing the latter's horrific acts. Kubrick in fact shot a scene where Jack discovers the scrapbook but removed it during post-production, a decision which co-screenwriter Diane Johnson lamented.

Some of the film's most iconic scenes, such as the ghost girls in the hallway, the torrent of blood from the elevators, and typewritten pages Wendy discovers on Jack's desk, are unique to the film. Similarly, many of the most memorable lines of dialogue ("Words of wisdom" and "Here's Johnny!") are heard exclusively in the film.

=== Film adaptation commentary ===
Although Stephen King fans were critical of the novel's adaptation on the grounds that Kubrick altered and reduced the novel's themes, a defense of Kubrick's approach was made in Steve Biodrowski's review of the film. He argues that as in earlier films, Kubrick stripped out the back story of the film, reducing it to a "basic narrative line", making the characters more like archetypes. His review of the film is one of the few to go into detailed comparison with the novel. He writes, "The result ... [is] a brilliant, ambitious attempt to shoot a horror film without the Gothic trappings of shadows and cobwebs so often associated with the genre."

== Influence in popular culture ==
Both parodies and homages to The Shining are prominent in UK and U.S. popular culture, particularly in films, TV shows, video games and music. Images and scenes including the Grady girls in the hallway, the word "Redrum", the blood spilling out of the elevator doors and Jack sticking his head through the hole in the bathroom door, saying, "Here's Johnny", are frequently referenced in the media.

The Simpsons season 6 episode "Treehouse of Horror V" includes a parody titled "The Shinning". Similarities include Sherri and Terri, the twins in Bart's fourth grade class looking visually similar to the Grady girls, Homer writing "No TV and No Beer Make Homer Go Crazy" and Homer breaking into a room with an axe and uttering 'here's Johnny', only to discover that he had entered the wrong room and using the introduction for 60 Minutes instead.

Dutch dance music duo Hocus Pocus sampled Nicholson's "Here's Johnny" line in their 1993 dance song "Here's Johnny". In 1995, the song reached number one in Australia for six weeks, making it the first dance single to do so without radio support in Australia.

American heavy metal band Slipknot pay homage to the film in their first music video for their 1999 song "Spit It Out", directed by Thomas Mignone. The video consists of conceptual imagery of the band members each portraying characters enacting iconic scenes from the film, with Joey Jordison as Danny Torrance; Shawn Crahan and Chris Fehn as the Grady sisters; Corey Taylor as Jack Torrance; Mick Thomson as Lloyd the Bartender; Craig Jones as Dick Hallorann; James Root as Wendy Torrance; Paul Gray as Harry Derwent; and Sid Wilson as the corpse in the bathtub. The video was banned from MTV for overtly graphic and violent depictions, including Corey Taylor's smashing through a door with an axe and the scene wherein James Root viciously assaults Corey Taylor with a baseball bat. Mignone and the band eventually re-edited a less violent version, which was subsequently aired on MTV.

The film's haunted ballroom scene served as inspiration for English musician Leyland Kirby to create the Caretaker alias; his debut album Selected Memories from the Haunted Ballroom (1999) featured a prominent influence from the film.

American rock band Thirty Seconds to Mars produced a music video for their 2006 single "The Kill" which is an extended homage to the film. The music video is set in a haunted hotel, and replicates imagery from the film including the black intertitles with white text, Jack's typewriter, Lloyd's bar, Jack bouncing a tennis ball against a wall, the ghostly woman in the bathroom, the murdered Grady sisters, and the hotel guest being fellated by another man dressed as a bear. The music video was directed by lead singer Jared Leto.

Director Tim Burton, who credits Kubrick as an influence, modeled the characters of Tweedledum and Tweedledee in his 2010 version of Alice in Wonderland on the Grady girls (like so many viewers of the film, Burton identifies the girls as twins in spite of Ullman's dialogue to the contrary).

Vince Gilligan, being a fan of Kubrick and his "non-submersible moments", has included references to Kubrick movies in many of his works. "I'm happy to see that his inspiration has shown in noticeable ways in our work in Breaking Bad and Better Call Saul", says Gilligan. Breaking Bad's 2010 episode "Sunset" has a cop radioing for assistance and begins, "KDK-12" – the radio address at the Overlook, before being axed. The axe-murdered Grady sisters in The Shining are turned into the axe-murdering Salamanca twins in Breaking Bad. The descent of the main character, school teacher Walt, into the dark killer has some similarities to Jack's arc. Reflections are used in both to show the characters change. Better Call Saul has a "Here's Johnny" scare in an episode. Gilligan has also likened his early writing situation, getting snowed in and not writing, to feeling like Jack while going insane.

The TV series Psych has a 2012 episode titled "Heeeeere's Lassie" in which the plot and characters are based on the film. "Here's Johnny!" was parodied by British comedian Lenny Henry in an advertisement for Premier Inn. It was banned from being screened on a children's TV network.

The 2017 song "Enjoy Your Slay" by American metalcore band Ice Nine Kills is inspired primarily by the novel as well as the film adaptation. The song also features Stanley Kubrick's grandson Sam Kubrick as guest vocalist.

Steven Spielberg, a close friend of Kubrick, included a sequence dedicated to The Shining in the 2018 film Ready Player One when they could not get rights to use Blade Runner for a similar sequence. The Overlook Hotel is recreated, including the Grady sisters, the elevator, room 237, the lady in the bath tub, the ballroom, and the 1921 photo, in addition to using the score the reference. Spielberg considered this inclusion a tribute to Kubrick.

In Andy Muschietti's 2019 film It Chapter Two, which is based on It, another Stephen King novel, Pennywise takes the form of Henry Bowers while tormenting Beverly in a bathroom stall, and repeats the "here's Johnny!" line to her through the stall door. Bev nearly drowns in the blood that floods around her, similar to the elevator of blood in The Shining. Dick Hallorann was featured in the HBO prequel series It: Welcome to Derry, which premiered on October 26, 2025. The series is set years before The Shining.

== Related media ==
=== Sequel ===
In 2014, Warner Bros. Pictures began developing a film adaptation of Doctor Sleep (2013), Stephen King's sequel to his book, The Shining (1977). In 2016, Akiva Goldsman announced that he would write and produce the film for Warner Bros. For several years, Warner Bros could not secure a budget for the sequel nor for a prequel to The Shining to be called Overlook Hotel. In June 2019, writer and director Mike Flanagan confirmed Doctor Sleep would be a sequel to both the 1980 film and King's novel. It was released in several international territories on October 31, 2019, followed by the United States and Canada on November 8, 2019.

=== Possible spin-offs ===
Prior to the release of Doctor Sleep, it was revealed that Warner Bros. had enough confidence in the film that they hired Mike Flanagan to script a prequel with the working title Hallorann, focusing on the character of Dick Hallorann. In August 2020, Flanagan stated that the project has been placed on an indefinite hold following the disappointing box-office performance of Doctor Sleep, while noting that it may be revived in the future. In September 2022, Flanagan confirmed the project was eventually scrapped. In December 2025, however, following the success of It: Welcome to Derry, plans for a spin-off focusing on Hallorann have resurfaced.

In November 2019, Flanagan also stated that he was interested in directing a spin-off focused on Abra Stone, and that he has discussed the idea with Stephen King, who was receptive to the idea.

In April 2020, a spin-off titled Overlook entered development for HBO Max. In August 2021, HBO Max opted not to proceed with the project. It was soon after reported Netflix was a frontline bidder on the project, though they too, eventually passed.

== See also ==
- List of ghost films
- Room 237, a 2012 documentary about interpretations of The Shining
