= The Shadow Knows =

1974 novel by Diane Johnson

- First edition cover
- Author: Diane Johnson
- Language: English
- Genre: Psychological horror, thriller
- Publisher: Alfred A. Knopf
- Publication date: January 1, 1974
- Publication place: United States
- Media type: Print (Hardback)
- Pages: 277 pp
- ISBN: 039448035X
- OCLC: 37705298

The Shadow Knows is a 1974 psychological horror novel by Diane Johnson. It is told from the point of view of a young divorced woman, who soon discovers that she is stalked by the mysterious person.

The novel caught the attention of film director Stanley Kubrick, who was so impressed with the novel that he offered Johnson a job as a co-writer on the 1980 film The Shining. At one point before filming The Shining, Kubrick had also considered filming The Shadow Knows.

== Plot ==
The main character of the story is a young divorced woman and mother of four children, who lives in Sacramento, California. After going through a tough ordeal with her ex-husband, she tries to get a graduate degree to improve her family's quality of life, until new problems begin to arise: her door has been hacked with an axe, a strangled cat is found outside her apartment, and there are disturbing phone calls every day. Someone unknown has targeted her – perhaps even to kill her – and she begins her own detective work to find out who is stalking her.

== Reception ==
Karyl Roosevelt from The New York Times says that the author of three previous novels and a well-received biography introduces even more exciting elements in The Shadow Knows, but she says Johnson doesn't bring up enough in her work: "Her book conceals more than it reveals – I suspect because she doesn't know the necessary answers herself."
