= Le Divorce =

2003 US-France rom-com film

- Theatrical release poster
- Directed by: James Ivory
- Screenplay by: Ruth Prawer Jhabvala; James Ivory
- Based on: Le Divorce; 1997 novel by Diane Johnson
- Produced by: Ismail Merchant; Michael Schiffer
- Starring: Kate Hudson; Naomi Watts; Leslie Caron; Stockard Channing; Glenn Close; Stephen Fry; Thierry Lhermitte; Matthew Modine; Bebe Neuwirth; Sam Waterston
- Cinematography: Pierre Lhomme
- Edited by: John David Allen
- Music by: Richard Robbins
- Production companies: Merchant Ivory Productions; Radar Pictures; Interscope Communications
- Distributed by: Fox Searchlight Pictures (Worldwide); UGC Fox Distribution (France)
- Release dates: August 8, 2003 (United States); October 8, 2003 (France)
- Running time: 117 minutes
- Countries: United States; France
- Languages: English; French
- Box office: $13 million

Le Divorce is a 2003 romantic comedy-drama film directed by James Ivory from a screenplay by Ruth Prawer Jhabvala and Ivory, based on the 1997 novel of the same name by Diane Johnson starring Kate Hudson and Naomi Watts.

Le Divorce was released by Fox Searchlight Pictures on August 8, 2003 in the United States, and by UGC Fox Distribution on October 8, 2003 in France. The film received mixed reviews from critics and grossed $13 million.

== Plot ==
Isabel Walker travels to Paris to visit her sister Roxy, a poet who lives with her husband, Frenchman Charles-Henri de Persand, and their young daughter, Gennie. Roxy is pregnant, but her husband has just walked out on her without explanation. Isabel discovers that he has a mistress, a Russian woman named Magda Tellman, whom he intends to marry after securing a divorce from Roxy. Roxy refuses to divorce him.

Roxy is also in possession of a painting of Saint Ursula by Georges de La Tour; the painting belongs to the Walker family, but due to her marriage to Charles-Henri and French community property laws, the ownership is disputed between the two families. The Louvre deems the painting worthless and concludes that it is not a real La Tour. However, the J. Paul Getty Museum takes an interest in the painting and its curator believes that the painting was done by La Tour himself.

Paris-based American author Olivia Pace, a friend of Roxy's, offers Isabel a job. Isabel also meets Yves, Olivia's protégé, and they begin dating. The sisters visit Charles-Henri's family's country home for Sunday brunch, where Isabel meets Charles-Henri's mother Suzanne and her handsome middle-aged brother, Edgar Cosset. Isabel is attracted to the older, wealthy and married Edgar and they begin an affair, although Isabel continues to string Yves along. Edgar begins to send Isabel various gifts, including an expensive red Kelly bag by Hermès, which Isabel carries with her at all times. During a visit to Isabel, Suzanne discovers the Kelly bag, after which she realizes that Edgar is having an affair with Isabel.

Charles-Henri maintains a blasé attitude about his infidelity and insists on a divorce. He also hopes to benefit from the French community property laws in the divorce, especially with regard to the La Tour painting. His mistress Magda is married to a man named Tellman, who begins to stalk and harass Isabel and Roxy, believing the latter to be responsible for his wife's desertion. Charles-Henri's cruelty and insensitivity take their toll on Roxy, and she attempts suicide in late pregnancy. She survives and is supported by Isabel and her lawyer Bertram.

Roxy and Isabel's family arrive from the United States to support the sisters, and to also discuss the divorce proceedings and the ownership of the La Tour painting. Things are further complicated when Edgar's wife, Amélie, discovers the affair through Suzanne. Following a brunch with both families, Suzanne and Amélie privately inform Isabel's mother about the affair; she later confronts Isabel with this information.

During an outing, Magda and Charles-Henri tease Tellman with their new relationship. Later, they are both murdered by Tellman in a crime of passion, with Charles-Henri's body being found in Roxy's apartment complex. Roxy and Bertram come upon the scene and the stress causes her to go into labor. Tellman then follows Isabel and her family on an outing to the Eiffel Tower, where he corners them and pulls a gun, demanding an opportunity to explain to Roxy why he killed her husband. After some persuasion, the distraught Tellman releases the gun to Isabel, who puts it into the Kelly bag and throws it off the Eiffel Tower.

Edgar, persuaded by his socially-conscious family's concern, and tiring of his young lover, casually ends his affair with Isabel over lunch, with the gift of an Hermès scarf. Afterwards, Isabel begins a real relationship with Yves. After Roxy's baby is born, she marries Bertram. The family attends an art auction where the La Tour painting sells to The Getty for 4.5 million euros. Because its ownership is no longer disputed due to Charles-Henri's death, the money goes to the Walker family, who then go on to establish the "Fondation Sainte Ursule" (The Saint Ursula Foundation).

== Cast ==
- Kate Hudson as Isabel Walker
- Naomi Watts as Roxeanne de Persand
- Leslie Caron as Suzanne de Persand
- Stockard Channing as Margeeve Walker
- Glenn Close as Olivia Pace
- Thierry Lhermitte as Edgar Cosset
- Stephen Fry as Piers Janely
- Melvil Poupaud as Charles-Henri de Persand
- Matthew Modine as Tellman
- Bebe Neuwirth as Julia Manchevering
- Sam Waterston as Chester Walker
- Marie-Christine Adam as Amélie Cosset
- Thomas Lennon as Roger Walker
- Jean-Marc Barr as Maitre Bertram
- Romain Duris as Yves
- Catherine Samie as Madame Florian
- Esmée Buchet-Deàk as Gennie de Persand
- Samuel Labarthe as Antoine de Persand
- Nathalie Richard as Charlotte de Persand
- Rona Hartner as Magda Tellman

== Production ==
The film was originally developed by Interscope Communications, a predecessor to Radar Pictures in 1997 under a deal with BallPark Productions. Kate Hudson and Naomi Watts were signed up in 2002.

=== Locations ===
Le Divorce was filmed in Paris at locations including Café de Flore, Tour Eiffel, Musée du Louvre and Salle Gaveau. The Eiffel Tower's elevators, stairways and various levels are seen extensively near the end of the film.

== Music ==
The opening title music was Paul Misraki's "Qu'est-ce qu'on attend pour être heureux", sung by Patrick Bruel and Johnny Hallyday from Bruel's album Entre deux. The end title music was Serge Gainsbourg's "L'Anamour", sung by Jane Birkin from her album Versions Jane.

== Release ==
=== Reception ===
Le Divorce was given an initial limited release on August 8, 2003, in 34 theaters, where it grossed $516,834 on its opening weekend. It went into wide release on August 29, in 701 theaters, where it grossed $1.5 million on its opening weekend. The film went on to make $9 million in North America and $3.9 million in the rest of the world, for a worldwide total of $12.9 million.

=== Critical response ===
On the review aggregator website Rotten Tomatoes, 35% of 138 critics' reviews are positive, with an average rating of 5.2/10. The website's consensus reads: "A mixed bag of uneven tones that feels flat." Metacritic, which uses a weighted average, assigned the film a score of 51 out of 100, based on 36 critics, indicating "mixed or average" reviews.

Roger Ebert of the Chicago Sun-Times gave the film three out of four stars and felt that it did not "work on its intended level, because we don't care enough about the interactions of the enormous cast. But it works in another way, as a sophisticated and knowledgeable portrait of values in collision". In his review for The New York Times, A. O. Scott wrote: "As it is, Le Divorce is tasteful, but almost entirely without flavor. It is tough work to sit through a comedy made by filmmakers with so little sense of timing and no evident sense of humor". Entertainment Weekly gave the film a "C" rating and Owen Gleiberman wrote: "I'm disappointed to report that Hudson and Watts have no chemistry as sisters, perhaps because Watts never seems like the expatriate artiste she's supposed to be playing". In his review for the Village Voice, David Ng wrote: "Indeed, featuring a boatload of intercontinental stars who have little to do, Le Divorce uncannily embodies its privileged bilingual milieu. At worst, it suggests a documentary of its own lavish wrap party". Premiere magazine's Glenn Kenny gave the film three out of four stars and wrote that "the picture is a nice return to form for Ivory and company, as well as a welcome stretch for Kate Hudson, whose luminous talents, I fear, are going to be hidden under bushels of stupid Hollywood romantic comedies for the foreseeable future". In his review for The New York Observer, Andrew Sarris wrote: "The film's greatest achievement, however, is in keeping a dizzying variety of characters at odds with each other without any breach of good manners, and without descending to facile stereotypes and caricatures".
