= Diane Johnson =

American writer (born 1934)

- Born: Diane Lain; April 28, 1934 (age 92); Moline, Illinois, U.S.
- Education: Stephens College (BA)
- Spouse(s): Lamar Johnson (1953–1960s) John F. Murray (m. 1968; died 2020)
- Children: 4
- Writing career
- Genres: Fiction, satire, essays, screenwriting
- Notable awards: American Academy of Arts and Letters, 1999

Diane Johnson (born Diane Lain, April 28, 1934) is an American novelist and essayist whose satirical novels often feature American heroines living in contemporary France. She was a finalist for the Pulitzer Prize for her novel Persian Nights in 1988.

In addition to her literary works, she is also known for writing the screenplay of the 1980 film The Shining together with its director and producer Stanley Kubrick.

== Early life ==
Johnson was born in Moline, Illinois.

== Career ==
Johnson is the author of Lulu in Marrakech (2008), L'Affaire (2003), Le Mariage (2000), and Le Divorce (1997), among other works, both fictional and non-fictional. She was a National Book Award finalist and the winner of the California Book Award gold medal for "Le Divorce." Her memoir Flyover Lives was released in January 2014.

She has been a frequent contributor to The New York Review of Books since the mid-1970s.

Johnson was teaching a seminar on Gothic novels at the University of California at Berkeley when she published her 1974 novel The Shadow Knows. Stanley Kubrick was impressed by her novel and in late 1976, while visiting England, she received a phone call from the director to discuss writing a screenplay for The Shining (1980), adaptation from the horror novel of the same name by Stephen King.

In 2003, Le Divorce, a film adaptation of her 1997 comedy of manners novel of the same name, was released, directed by James Ivory and starred Kate Hudson and Naomi Watts.

== Personal life ==
Johnson attended Stephens College, a small women's college in Missouri. In her sophomore year, she entered the Mademoiselle magazine Guest Editor contest and was selected as one of 20 women from across the United States to work on the magazine for a month in New York City in 1953. Her time at the magazine would prove to be formative in her eventual career as a writer. Another member of the group was Sylvia Plath who would write about the experience in her 1963 novel The Bell Jar.

Johnson shadowed the Health and Beauty editor and was responsible for answering readers' questions about makeup. In a piece she wrote for the September 2003 edition of Vogue magazine, Johnson said: "I still have a strong memory of Plath's white straw beret, her blonde pageboy and cheerful face. None of us understood the anguish of her secret life, though maybe the editors did, for they treated her carefully, the one most destined to succeed."

In the Vogue article, Johnson wrote the month at Mademoiselle and her exposure to Plath taught her a key lesson. "I realized that if you took pains with your writing, you could make art, and that the rather facile little stories I had dashed off for my English classes or the school magazine were probably not art. It was, in fact, the example of "Sunday at the Mintons'," Sylvia Plath's winning story in the Guest Editor contest, that made that point to me and changed my life, though not immediately."

Johnson went on to say, "Writing was a serious form of work, and to be serious, like those New York editors, you had to send in your stories. Writers and editors were embarked on a consequential enterprise, the business of literature and books. What happiness to have been taught that lesson; I did send in my novels."

That same year, 1953, Johnson married B. Lamar Johnson Jr. Within eight years, she had given birth to four children with him: Kevin, Darcy, Amanda, and Simon. In the Vogue article she wrote, "Novel-writing would become my refuge during moments snatched during their naps and play visits. New York...came to symbolize a road not taken, but I was not sorry, exactly, for if I had stayed in New York, I probably would not have done my writing."

After separating from and divorcing B. Lamar Johnson Jr., in 1968 she married John F. Murray, a physician who became chief of pulmonary and critical care at San Francisco General Hospital. After Murray's retirement, the two divided their time between homes in Paris, where Murray died of COVID-19 on March 24, 2020, at the age of 92, and San Francisco.

== Bibliography ==
=== Novels ===
- Fair Game (1965)
- Loving Hands at Home (1968)
- Burning (Dutton, 1971)
- The Shadow Knows (Dutton, 1974)
- Lying low (Knopf, 1978)
- Persian Nights (Knopf, 1987)
- Health and Happiness (Knopf, 1990)
- Le Divorce (Dutton, 1997)
- Le Mariage (Dutton, 2000)
- L'Affaire (Dutton, 2003)
- Lulu in Marrakech (Dutton, 2008)
- Lorna Mott Comes Home (Knopf, 2021)

=== Non-fiction ===
- The True History of Mrs. Meredith and Other Lesser Lives (Knopf, 1972)
- Dashiell Hammett: A Life (1983)
- Natural Opium: Some Travelers' Tales (Knopf, 1993)
- Terrorists and Novelists: Essays (Knopf, 1982).
- Into a Paris Quartier: Reine Margot's Chapel and Other Haunts of St.-Germain (National Geographic Directions, 2005)
- Flyover Lives: A Memoir (Viking, 2014)
