= J. W. Rinzler =

American author of behind the scenes books (1962–2021)

Jonathan W. Rinzler
- Born: August 17, 1962; Berkeley, California, U.S.
- Died: July 28, 2021 (aged 58); Albion, California, U.S.
- Occupations: Editor, author
- Website: Official website

Jonathan W. Rinzler (August 17, 1962 – July 28, 2021) was a film historian and author, known for publishing books about the behind the scenes of blockbuster movies such as Star Wars, Indiana Jones, and The Shining. Rinzler also wrote the novel Indiana Jones and the Mystery of Mount Sinai, as well as All Up, about the Space Race.

Rinzler is primarily known for being the target inspiration for Rinzler, a character from the 2010 Disney film, Tron: Legacy, that was named after him, according to the film’s director, Joseph Kosinski. Rinzler’s character is later revealed to be Tron himself, after he was decoded by Kevin Flynn’s likeness program, Clu 2.

== Career ==
After living in France for almost ten years, Jonathan Rinzler returned to the United States looking to work in the movie industry, more specifically with Lucasfilm. Rinzler, who had been working as a managing editor until that point, was interviewed for a position in the company to work with non-fiction books. He then joined the company in 2001, as the executive editor of LucasBooks, the company's publishing arm.

At the time, the company was producing Episode II: Attack of the Clones, and Rinzler had been hired to produce a series of books about the making of their movies. Rinzler met with Rick McCallum and they talked about how the books should be "about the whole production" instead of focusing only on the special effects. After producing a book on all movies of the trilogy, Rinzler maintained contact with Lucasfilm and was commissioned to produce a making-of Indiana Jones in 2008. Despite having left the company in 2016, Rinzler still produced a book about the behind the scenes of the 1968 film Planet of the Apes for Disney in 2018.

In a 2019 interview to The Verge, Rinzler explained his love for making of books came about after watching Jaws (1975) and acquiring The Jaws Log as well as Industrial Light & Magic: The Art of Special Effects.

In 2019, Rinzler published The Making of Alien, a behind-the-scenes book about the making of the 1979 film Alien with cast and crew interviews and previously-unseen photographs. This was followed by The Making of Aliens, a behind-the-scenes book about the making of the 1986 film Aliens in 2020.

Rinzler also published a novel in 2020 called All Up, about the Space Race between the United States and Soviet Russia. He spent one year researching for the book, and about seven years writing it sporadically, until its publication.

== Death ==
In November 2020, Rinzler's wife announced that he had been diagnosed with pancreatic cancer in August. On August 4, 2021, his death was announced by his daughter, through Rinzler's Twitter account, saying he had died on July 28. His last two books Howard Kazanjian: A Producer's Life and Stanley Kubrick's The Shining were published posthumously in September 2021 and February 2023.

== Selected works ==
Non-fiction books

- The Making of Star Wars: Revenge of the Sith. Del Rey Books. 2005. ISBN 978-0-34543-139-4.
- The Making of Star Wars. New York: Ballantine Books. 2007. ISBN 978-0-345-49476-4.
- The Complete Making of Indiana Jones: The Definitive Story Behind All Four Films. Ebury. 2008. ISBN 9780091926618.
- The Making of Star Wars: The Empire Strikes Back. London: Aurum Press. 2010. ISBN 978-1-84513-555-3. OCLC 657407687.
- The Making of Return of the Jedi: The Definitive Story Behind the Film. Aurum. 2013. ISBN 978-1-78131-076-2.
- The Making of Planet of the Apes. London: HarperCollins. 2018. ISBN 978-0-06284-062-2.
- The Making of Alien. London: Titan Books. 2019. ISBN 978-1-78909-055-0.
- The Making of Aliens. London: Titan Books. 2020. ISBN 978-1-78909-310-0.
- Howard Kazanjian: A Producer's Life. Cameron + Company. 2021. ISBN 978-1-95183-618-4.
- Stanley Kubrick's The Shining. Taschen. 2023. ISBN 978-3754400036.

Fiction books

- Indiana Jones and the Mystery of Mount Sinai. Scholastic. 2009. ISBN 978-0-54511-206-2.
- All Up. Permuted Press. 2020. ISBN 978-1-68261-901-8.
