= Smutna opowieść =

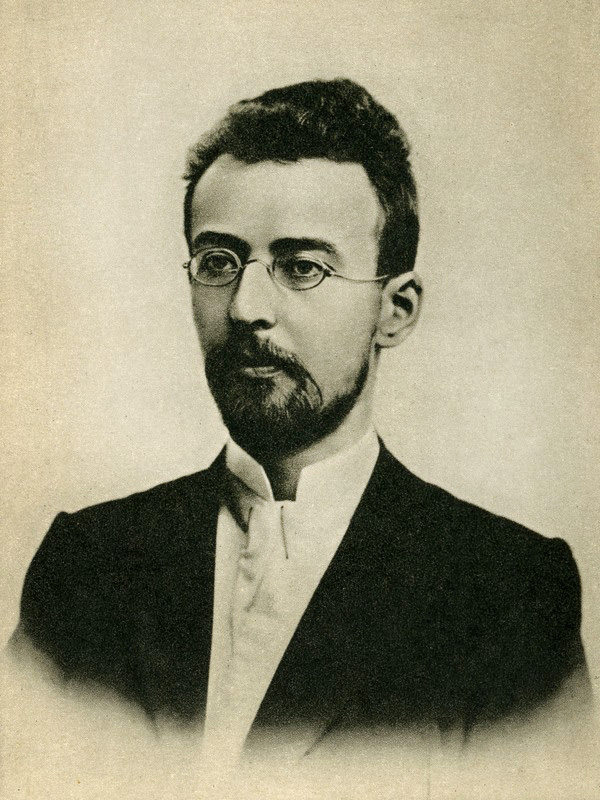
Mieczysław Karłowicz

Smutna opowieść (Preludia do wieczności) [Polish for A Sorrowful Tale (Preludes to Eternity); less frequently translated as A Sad Story], in F-sharp minor, Op. 13 is the fifth of Mieczysław Karłowicz's six symphonic poems and the last finished work of him (though begun before this, the Epizod na maskaradzie, Op. 14 remained unfinished at the time of his death). Harmonically, it is the most innovative of all his compositions, while stylistically it is near to the aesthetic of expressionism. It is also the shortest of his symphonic poems at just 221 bars lasting about 11 minutes.

== History ==
Karłowicz began working on the piece in late 1907. It took shape in April–July 1908 and was finished while he was staying in Zakopane. The first performance was given by the Warsaw Philharmonic under Grzegorz Fitelberg in Warsaw Philharmonic Concert Hall on 13 November 1908. The second performance, at the Great Hall of the Vienna Musikverein, followed a month later (4 December), and on that occasion the Wiener Tonkünstler-Orchester was conducted by the composer himself.

Just two weeks after Karłowicz's death, Fitelberg conducted this symphonic poem in Warsaw for another time. He did so also at memorial concerts for the anniversary of the composer's death in 1910, 1911, and 1913. In 1924, Poznań Opera staged a ballet for this music, in the finale of which the character representing the composer was to commit a suicide.

The first edition was made by the Warsaw Music Society in 1913 (publisher Gebethner and Wolff, plate G 5079 W).

Unlike most of Karłowicz's manuscripts, the one of this work survived World War II and is preserved at the Library of the Warsaw Music Society.

== Programme ==
There is no programme provided by the composer for A Sorrowful Tale. Instead of it, there is a report by Ignacy Chabielski, who interviewed Karłowicz shortly before the premiere, published in the Scena i Sztuka magazine:

In this poem, cast in a free form, the composer depicts the psychology of a suicidal man. A gloomy introduction characterizes the mood and feelings of the man in whose mind the thought of suicide has arisen, seeping through from the deepest recesses of his consciousness on an undercurrent of apathy and disenchantment with life. It slowly permeates his mind, like the dripping of water, and leads to a struggle between the desire for life, which recalls a vision of beautiful moments from the past, and the idée fixe of suicide. This struggle is fought out between the two contending themes, and the latter is victorious: the shot is fired... There is still a moment of struggle, the final spasms of the perishing life; in elation the man slowly falls into a state of ever-deepening unconsciousness into nothingness.

In 1982, Henryk Anders suggested that the impulse for this composition was the suicide of Józefat Nowiński committed in July 1906. The man, a playwright, was Karłowicz's close friend, for a play of whom Karłowicz wrote incidental music (Bianca da Molena, Op. 6).

Dealing with the theme of a suicide makes a relation of this piece with the first of symphonic poems by Karłowicz, Powracające fale, Op. 9, the narrative of which it 'completes'.

== Scoring ==
The piece is scored for 3 flutes (the third is interchangeable with a piccolo), alto flute, 3 oboes, English horn, 3 clarinets (1 in E♭, 2 in A), bass clarinet (B♭), 3 bassoons, contrabassoon; 6 horns (F), 3 trumpets (C), 2 tenor trombones, bass trombone, tuba; timpani, triangle and strings.

=== The revolver shot ===
On 17 December 1907, a month after the completion of the Stanisław i Anna Oświecimowie, Karłowicz wrote to his friend Adolf Chybiński: "I shall shortly be starting a new work, but this time, because of the chosen programme, I will be compelled to seek out striking colours in the field of instrumental pyrotechnics" (poszukać jaskrawych barw z dziedziny 'pirotechniki' instrumentacyjnej). A year later, on 18 December 1908 (just 8 days after the completion of A Sorrowful Tale), he gave more details about the orchestration in a letter to Ludomir Różycki: "Similar orchestral forces are required for Oświecimowie – without a harp however. But there is an alto flute and once... a revolver shot". He also told about this shot in a conversation with Stanisław Szumowski, a close friend of him.

However, Karłowicz was not sure about this rather extreme gesture. Twenty days before the Warsaw premiere he wrote to Fitelberg: "The unfilled line above the triangle is the part of the pistol shot which ought to be placed at the point Allegro moderato (3rd bar after [figure] 24). In Vienna, I shall be replacing this vivid effect with a fff stroke on tam-tam".

This became a common practice: the "revolver" part is indicated as tam-tam in the published score, and the recordings of the piece use this instrument. The first commercial recording to introduce a real revolver shot into the music was made by Łukasz Borowicz for DUX in 2016 (issued 2017).

== Style ==
A Sorrowful Tale proves Karłowicz's interest in the expressionist aesthetic, as its main idea is to express directly subjective emotions, for what "instrumental pyrotechnics" and really drastic effects are used. The contrasts of the tone-colour are extreme, the idiom is tonally indeterminate and markedly dissonant. The music of this tone poem is a world of fears and psychological torments. The themes are hardly ones in the classical meaning, while the entire form represents a consistent development and evolution. Harmonically, it is the most innovative composition of Karłowicz. As the piece goes forth, the expression becomes more dramatic, more desperate, almost psychotic. One can speak of hysteria concerning what happens in the culminative bars.

== Analysis ==
=== Form and themes ===
The piece is based on two main themes, representing the desire for life and the idée fixe of suicide respectively. The character of the first changes a lot through the work: initially it is music of deep melancholy, but after the vigorous 'free' episode its mood is transformed into a joyful one (from bar 131 on). The tone of the second theme remains the same for the whole time, only increasing its horrific dissonances.

Structurally this piece can be divided in two main parts. The first part is the exposition of the themes; a good portion of their elaboration is made here nevertheless. In the second part they are developed once more, with the struggling between them intensifying towards the end. As suggested by the programme, victorious is the second theme. Michael Murphy provides a scheme to elucidate the piece's form:

	Bars	Theme	Tonality
First part	1–8	Introduction	B minor (?) – F♯ minor (?)
First part	9–36	Theme I	F♯ minor (?) – V/F♯ minor
First part	37–70	Theme II	Chromatic
First part	71–88	Codetta	V/F♯ minor
Second part	89–94	Introduction’	B minor (?) – F♯ minor(?)
Second part	95–112	Theme I’	F♯ minor (?)
Second part	113–130	Free	V/B major
Second part	131–163	Theme I’	V/B♭ major – V/E♭ major – B minor
Second part	163–176	Theme II’	B minor – Chromatic
Second part	177–184	Theme I’	V/A♭ major
Second part	185–194	Theme II’	Chromatic
Second part	195–210	Theme I’	B♭ major – V/F♯ minor
Second part	211–220	Coda	F♯ minor
(?) after the tonality indicates the tonal ambiguity ’ marks variants of original themes

The work opens with a brief introduction (Lento lugubre) presenting a sepulchral bass motif in divided strings. It leads to Theme I, which consists of a 2-bar ascending phrase on clarinets and a 2-bar "sighing" motif (resembling that of the introduction) on woodwinds. The most notable feature of Theme I is that it is "caught in a tonal trap": F♯ appears to be either dominant or tonic, but neither of the functions is realized.

Theme II (Moderato assai) consists of two principal motives too. The first is a chromatic gradually ascending sinister line on bassoons and clarinets accompanied by string tremolandi; the second is a descending complement (which is derived from the Gregorian Dies irae). The first statement of Theme II presents three phrases (bars 37–46, 47–60, 61–70). It is throughout chromatic except for the second motif of the first phrase, when a B minor harmonized theme of the Dies irae appears (it is the only instance when it can be easily recognized). This dominant collapses into further ambiguity without resolution. The third phrase of Theme II rises it to a screeching pitch. It is defused by a codetta.

The beginning of the second part is a varied repeat of that of the first: an introduction (Tempo I) in followed by Theme I in augmentation. Its statement is interrupted by a free material section (Poco più mosso), the most joyful in the whole composition. It is followed by a quasi-developmental section (Moderato giocoso): Theme I explores different keys. These episodes hint at Dante-like recurring visions of past happiness in time of misery.

They end abruptly with a new appearance of Theme II (Moderato assai), starting the "struggle" of the programme (though one can say that the entire work represents it). When its ascendance reaches its highest pitch, it is replaced by Theme I (a tempo), which is followed by Theme II again (Più mosso). A revolver shot (or a tam-tam stroke) in bar 195 marks the climax of the piece: at this point a real hysteria occurs. It means the victory of Theme II and is followed by a mangled version of Theme I (Allegro moderato). Preserving repetitions of the "sighing" motif (Meno mosso) lead to a brief coda (Tempo I) with the sombre motif of Theme II in the bass. The finale bars are full of chilling nihilism.

=== Tonality ===
According to Michael Murphy, the background tonal plan of the piece is as follows.

- First part: V/IV – V
- Second part: V/IV – IV – V – I

In the foreground it is elaborated to be ambiguous up to the very end. The introduction (bars 1—8) is tonally inductive and goes to the F♯ minor from its subdominant B minor. But a stable tonic of F♯ minor is not reached either here, or in the Theme I section (9–36): the music remains ambiguous and the thematic material is restive. The plagal move to F♯ minor is challenged at the end of the introduction (8) by the Phrygian cadence with a French augmented sixth chord. The aim of tonal structure of the entire work will be the resolution of the conflicts arose at this point.

Bars 9–27 contain an F♯ pedal, which, as the music goes on, becomes more and more charged with the instability of the dominant. One can read it as a suggestion of the subdominant. Only at bar 36 arrives the dominant of F♯ minor. It gets no resolution however. Next time it appears in bars 71–88, again not resolving, but the lengthy duration of this pedal makes a strong tonal point.

The second part of the piece begins with a shortened version of the introduction (89–94). The French augmented sixth chord and the Phrygian cadence onto F♯ are omitted. Instead there is a plagal cadence (94–95) into F♯ (it is suggested to be a minor key, although any qualifying third is absent). The F♯ pedal in 95–112 quickly loses any tonic stability which it may have acquired after this plagal cadence. The dissonaces accumulated above the pedal are charged with dominant anticipations in the next section (113–30). This section powerfully suggests B major, but it is never tonicized. B minor gruffly articulated in bar 163 is immediately quitted. Only in bar 203, after the climax, appears eventually the dominant of F♯ minor. A cadence (210) leads to the tonic (211).

The tonal plan of this piece has much in common with Chopin's Prelude No. 2 in A minor: both works set up the subdominant as a point of reference, only to cast it aside irrevocably. This tendency towards the subdominant in Karłowicz's tone poem plays an important role in the first part and the early sections of the second. Both works delay the dominant until the last possible moment.

== Recordings ==
- (first rec.) Warsaw National Philharmonic Orchestra, Stanisław Wisłocki – (LP, 1965) Polskie Nagrania Muza XL 0179
- (rec. 1981 or 1983) Silesian Philharmonic, Jerzy Salwarowski – reissued on DUX 132/133
- (rec. 2005) BBC Philharmonic, Gianandrea Noseda – Chandos 2010298
- (rec. 2006) New Zealand Symphony Orchestra, Antoni Wit – Naxos 8.570295
- (rec. 2016) Szczecin Philharmonic, Łukasz Borowicz – DUX 1377
