= List of symphonies in E minor =

This is a list of symphonies in E minor written by notable composers.

Composer	Symphony
Alexander Alyabyev	Symphony (1830)
Kurt Atterberg	Symphony No. 8, Op. 48 (1944–45)
Carl Philipp Emanuel Bach	Symphony in E minor, Wq.177 / H652 (1756, revised with added woodwinds as Wq.178 / H653)
Arnold Bax	Symphony No. 2 (1924–26)
Amy Beach	Symphony, Op. 32 "Gaelic" (1894–96)
Johannes Brahms	Symphony No. 4, Op. 98 (1884–85)
Havergal Brian	Symphony No. 2 (1930–31); Symphony No. 19 (1961)
George Frederick Bristow	Symphony No. 4, Op. 50 "Arcadian" (1872)
Ignaz Brüll	Symphony, Op. 31, 1880
Frederic Cliffe	Symphony No. 2, 1892
Felix Draeseke	Symphony No. 4, WoO 38 "Symphonia Comica" (1912)
Antonín Dvořák	Symphony No. 9, Op. 95, B. 178 (1893)
Zdeněk Fibich	Symphony No. 3, Op. 53 (1898)
Grzegorz Fitelberg	Symphony No. 1, Op. 16 (published 1904)
Alberto Franchetti	Symphony (1884)
Wilhelm Furtwängler	Symphony No. 2 (1945–46)
John Gardner	Symphony No. 3, Op. 189 (1989)
Edward German	Symphony No. 1 (1887, revised 1890)
Louis Glass	Symphony No. 4, Op. 43 (1911)
Howard Hanson	Symphony No. 1 "Nordic" (1922)
Joseph Haydn	Symphony No. 44 "Trauer" (1770)
Alfred Hill	Symphony No. 7 (1956 arrangement of Quartet No. 10, 1935)
Ferdinand Hiller	Symphony, "Es muss doch Fruhling werden" Op. 67
Joseph Holbrooke	Symphony No. 3 "Ships", Op. 90 ("Ships" / "Nelson" / "Our Navy", completed 1925)
Hans Huber	Symphony No. 2 "Böcklinsymphonie", Op. 115 (1897–98)
Joseph Huber	Symphony No. 3 "Durch Dunkel zum Licht", Op. 10
Mikhail Ippolitov-Ivanov	Symphony No. 1, Op. 46 (1908)
Mieczysław Karłowicz	Symphony, Op. 7 "Revival" (1902)
Hugo Kaun	Symphony No. 3, Op. 96 (1913)
Aram Khachaturian	Symphony No. 1 (1934); Symphony No. 2 "The Bell" (or "Symphony with Bells") (1943)
Joseph Martin Kraus	Symphony, VB 141 (possibly about 1782–83)
George Alexander Macfarren	Symphony (by 1874)
Gustav Mahler	Symphony No. 7 (1904–05)
Erkki Melartin	Symphony No. 2, Op. 30 No. 2 (1904)
Emánuel Moór	Symphony, Op. 65
Nikolai Myaskovsky	Symphony No. 4, Op. 17 (1917–18); Symphony No. 9, Op. 28 (1926–27)
Hubert Parry	Symphony No. 4 (begun around 1888–89, premiered 1889, revised 1910)
Florence Price	Symphony No. 1 (1932)
Henri Rabaud	Symphony No. 2, Op. 5 (1896-99?)
Sergei Rachmaninoff	Symphony No. 2, Op. 27 (1907)
Joachim Raff	Symphony No. 9, Op. 208 "Im Sommer" (1878)
Franz Xaver Richter	Sinfonia (ca. 1740, published 1744)
Nikolai Rimsky-Korsakov	Symphony No. 1, Op. 1 (revised version of 1884)
Jean Rivier	Symphony No.6 "Les Présages" (1956)
Joseph Ryelandt	Symphony No. 3, Op. 47 (1908)
Adolphe Samuel	Symphony No. 3, Op. 28 (1858)
Joly Braga Santos	Symphony No. 4, Op. 16 (1949)
Roger Sessions	Symphony No. 1 (1927)
Yuri Shaporin	Symphony (1932–33)
Dmitri Shostakovich	Symphony No. 10, Op. 93 (1948)
Jean Sibelius	"Kullervo" Symphony-Symphonic Poem, Op. 7 (1891–92); Symphony No. 1, Op. 39 (1898–99)
Sergei Taneyev	Symphony No. 1 (1874)
Pyotr Ilyich Tchaikovsky	Symphony No. 5, Op. 64 (1888)
Ralph Vaughan Williams	Symphony No. 6 (1948); Symphony No. 9 (1957)
Václav Jindřich Veit	Symphony, Op. 49 (first published in or by 1860)
Johannes Verhulst	Symphony, Op. 46
Louis Vierne	Organ Symphony No. 2, Op. 20 (1902–03)
Johann Baptist Wanhal	Symphony "Bryan e1" (circa 1764–67); Symphony "Bryan e3" (possibly 1760–62)
Christoph Ernst Friedrich Weyse	Symphony No. 4, DF 120 (1795)
