= Lithuanian Rhapsody =

Symphonic poem by Mieczysław Karłowicz (1906)

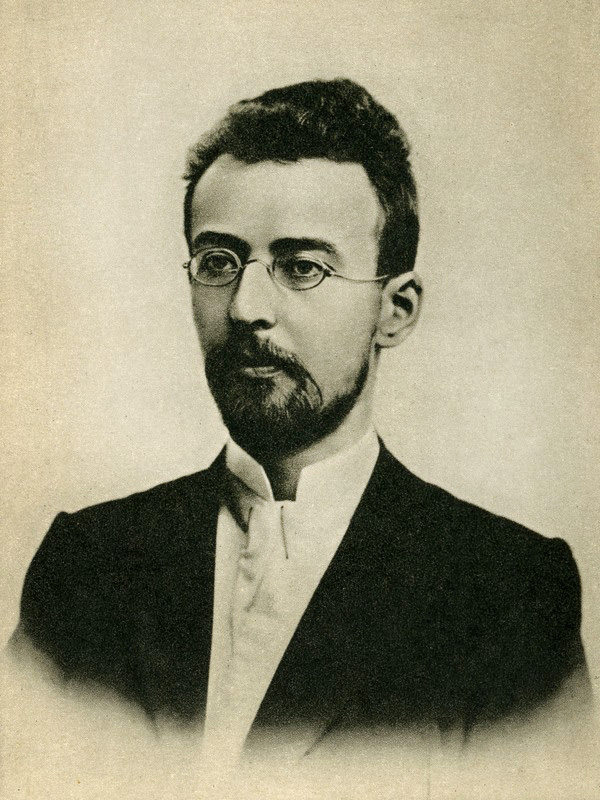
Mieczysław Karłowicz

Lithuanian Rhapsody (Polish Rapsodia litewska) in A minor, Op. 11 is the third of Mieczysław Karłowicz's six symphonic poems. A typical performance lasts 18–20 minutes.

== History ==
=== Origins of the composition ===
The Lithuanian Rhapsody differs from the other of Karłowicz's symphonic poems in the way that it was not inspired by any narrative or philosophical concern. It is a highly personal work and originates in the composer's own roots: he spent his early years in Lithuania (his family were Polish landowners). Moreover, unlike other compositions by Karłowicz, the Rhapsody is based on actual folk material (Lithuanian and Belarusian melodies), much of which was collected by the composer in 1900 while on vacation at his family estate. This is how he wrote about the piece in a letter to his friend Adolf Chybiński (24 Nov 1906):

I have tried to encapsulate within it the total grief, sadness and eternal servitude of that race whose songs I heard in my childhood... Whether or how much I have succeeded in instilling into the form of an orchestral work even just a particle of what hangs vanishing into the air in every part of that region, I am unable to judge.

According to Leszek Polony, the leading Polish authority on Karłowicz, the Rhapsody had to do with "recollections of childhood, with the portrayal of the family home and children’s games".

=== Composition and performance history ===
It was composed between April and November 1906. While Karłowicz began working on it in Warsaw, he later moved to Zakopane. At the time he finished the Rhapsody, he was already residing in Leipzig.

The first performance took place in Warsaw on 25 or 26 February 1909 under Grzegorz Fitelberg, shortly after Karłowicz's tragic death (8 February). In 1910 or early 1911 a Gebethner and Wolff first edition was published by the Warsaw Music Society (plate G 4791 W).

In later years the Rhapsody was heard in Polish concert halls of Warsaw, Kraków and Lviv, but also abroad: in Nice, Glasgow, Saint Petersburg and London. It was performed by several prominent conductors like Grzegorz Fitelberg, Emil Młynarski, Mieczysław Sołtys, Zdzisław Birnbaum, Henryk Opieński and José Lassalle.

In 1923 a ballet with the music of this tone poem was staged at the Grand Theater of Poznań. In 1983 together with the Violin Concerto and some songs of Karłowicz the Rhapsody was included in a theatre play of Adam Hanuszkiewicz at the Grand Theatre of Łódź.

== Scoring ==
It is scored for three flutes, two oboes, English horn, two clarinets (B♭), bass clarinet (B♭), two bassoons, four horns (F), two trumpets (C), three trombones; timpani, triangle, cymbals and strings.

== Structure ==
The Rhapsody is a sequence of loosely related five sections:

- Allegro ben moderato (A minor) —
- Lento (C♯ minor) — Allegretto pastorale (E major) — Lento (C♯ minor) —
- Andante tranquillo (D♭ major) —
- Allegretto giocoso (F major) —
- Tempo I (Allegro ben moderato)

== Analysis ==
In this composition, Karłowicz used Russian formal models. They are essentially non-developmental and rely on harmonic, textural, colouristic and orchestral variation. The sense of connectedness of the sections is made by occasional direct thematic links (the third and the fourth sections), more subtle allusions and the return of the opening material at the end.

The work is based in A minor and its mediant-related keys. The outer sections draw on an incantatory three-note melody, which is most likely an old Lithuanian harvest-time song Békit, bareliai (there is a harmonization of it by Čiurlionis).

The second section is a lyric one containing pastoral elements (as there are two themes instead of one). The theme of the third section is a popular Belarusian lullaby. The fourth section uses a version of this, dancing and vigorous, resembling a Lithuanian song Mylu, mylu, mylu sung by children. It leads to the whole work's climax.

== Recordings ==
- (first rec.) Polish National Radio Symphony Orchestra, Tadeusz Mazurkiewicz – (LP, 1934) Columbia Records DMX 260-261
- Warsaw National Philharmonic Orchestra, Witold Rowicki – (LP, 1956/1958) Polskie Nagrania Muza XL 0006; (CD, 1999) Polskie Nagrania Muza PNCD 473 A/B
- Warsaw National Philharmonic Orchestra, Stanisław Wisłocki – (LP, 1966/1970) Polskie Nagrania Muza XL 0290
- (rec. 1981 or 1983) Silesian Philharmonic, Jerzy Salwarowski – (LP, 1984) Wifon 064; (CD, 1989) Le Chant du Monde LDC 278 966-967; (CD, 1999, 2008) DUX 132/133
- (live rec. 1996) Warsaw Symphony Orchestra, Jacek Kaspszyk – (1997) Pro Musica Camerata PMC 013/14
- (rec. 2001) BBC Philharmonic, Yan Pascal Tortelier – Chandos 209986
- (rec. 2006) Warsaw Philharmonic Orchestra, Antoni Wit – Naxos 8.570452
- (rec. 2015) Royal Philharmonic Orchestra, Grzegorz Nowak – RPO SP 52
- (rec. 2016) Szczecin Philharmonic, Łukasz Borowicz – DUX 1377
