= Adolf Chybiński =

Polish musicologist and academic (1880–1952)

Adolf Eustachy Chybiński
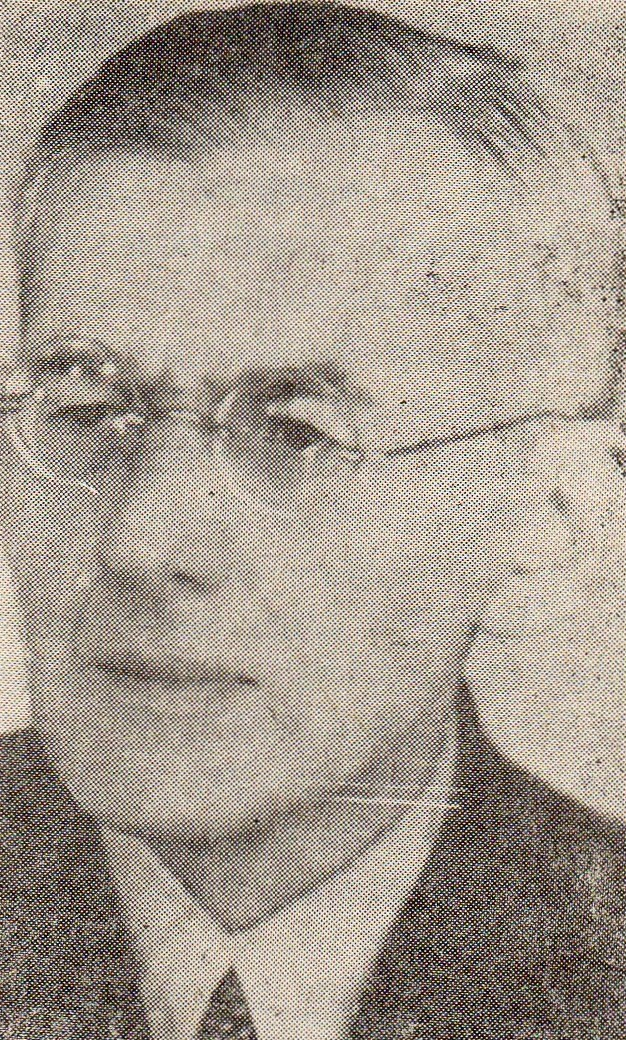
- Born: 29 April 1880; Kraków, Poland
- Died: 31 October 1952 (aged 72); Poznań, Poland
- Education: Adam Mickiewicz University in Poznań, Jagiellonian University, University of Lviv
- Occupations: Musicologist, Historian, Academic

Adolf Chybiński (29 April 1880 – 31 October 1952) was a Polish musicologist and academic.

== Early life and education ==
Adolf Eustachy Chybiński was the son of the industrialist Adolf and Maria z Górskich. He was educated at a gymnasium in Kraków, and studied German, classical philology and law at Jagiellonian University (1898-1899).

He received private lessons on piano and music theory in Kraków (1898-1901) from Jan Drozdowski.

In 1901-2 he studied in Heidelberg. From 1904-1908 in Munich, he studied musicology, art history and philosophy. In 1908 in Munich he defended his doctorate Contributions to the history of the timing and the Kapellmeisteramt in the epoch of Mensuralmusik (Beitrage zur Geschichte des Taktschlegens und des Kapellmeisteramtes in der Epoche der Mensuralmusik).

He continued his researches into the history of Polish music for several years in Munich, preparing a post-doctoral dissertation under the guidance of Guido Adler. He defended it in 1912 (The mensural theory in Polish music works of the first half of the sixteenth century) at the University of Lviv and became a lecturer and head of the Department of Musicology of this university.

== Musicology career ==
From 1917 he was an associate professor at the University of Lviv, from 1920 a full professor; in the academic year 1928/1929 he was the dean of the Faculty of Humanities. In the years 1917-1927, he lectured at the same time on music theory at the Lviv Conservatory.

After the first World War, he became a professor at Poznań University, and headed the Department of Musicology and lectured on the history of Old Polish music, Polish musical folklore and music theory. For a short time in 1948, he was the director of the Poznań Opera. He also chaired the Theoretic Section of the Music School Programming Committee and the State Music Publishing Council.

In his academic research he dealt with the history of the Polish Renaissance and Baroque music as well as musical ethnography. He studied the works of, among others Mikołaj Gomółka, Jan z Lublina and Jacek Różycki. He was the initiator of making copies of 15th - 18th-century music manuscripts, and discovered many unknown monuments of Polish music from that period. He prepared the 22 issue of the cycle of the Publishing House of Old Polish Music (1928-1951), and the individual works of former composers. He initiated research on Polish musical folklore and the collecting of folk songs.

He devoted a great deal of attention to highlander music - culture, as well as the nature of Podhale. Mountaineering was his passion, and he worked with The Tatra Museum in Zakopane for many years. He demonstrated the affinity of some melodies of Polish Tatra highlanders to the melodies of Czech, Slovak and Hungarian highlanders.

In 1951, he published a collection of lesser-known melodies and folk songs From the Tatra Mountains to the Baltic Sea (Śpiewnik krajoznawczy – od Tatr do Bałtyku), and was involved editorially on the work Analysis and explanation of the works of Frédéric Chopin (Analiza i objaśnienia dzieł wszystkich Fryderyka Chopina).

In addition, he worked as co-editor of "Kwartalnik Muzyczny" (1928–1931, 1948–1950) and "Polski Rocznik Muzykologiczny" (1935–1936). During the German occupation he gave private music lessons and worked as a translator for a social insurance company.

In 1945 Chybiński received a chair at the University of Poznań and headed the Faculty of Music here until 1952. In 1949 appeared the first volume of his monograph on Mieczysław Karłowicz, and in 1950 he received an honorary doctorate from the University of Poznań. In 1952 he became an honorary member of the Polish Academy of Sciences .

== Affiliations ==
In 1929 he became a correspondent member and in 1945 an active member of the Polish Academy of Learning; shortly before his death, he was granted the title of a full member of the Polish Academy of Sciences (1952). In the years 1948-1949 he was a member of the Polish Academy of Learning Musicological Commission, and from 1920 the Scientific Society in Lviv. In 1948 he was one of the founding members of the Musicology Section of the Polish Composers' Union and the vice-president of the section.

In addition, he was active in the Poznań Society of Friends of Sciences and the Polish Tatra Society (honorary member). He was honored with two memorial books (1930 and 1950). Among his friends he numbered Mieczysław Karłowicz, Grzegorz Fitelberg, Ludomir Różycki, Karol Szymanowski, Jarosław Iwaszkiewicz, and Jan Gwalbert Pawlikowski . His students included Józef Michał Chomiński, Zofia Lissa, Stefania Turkewich, and Zygmunt Szweykowski.

In 1947 he was awarded the Poznań Province Prize for his work, and in 1951 he received the State First Degree Award. Also in 1951 he was awarded an honorary doctorate from Poznań University. He was awarded the Commander's Cross of the Order of Polonia Restituta (1929), the Golden Cross of Merit (1937) for merits in the field of science and pedagogy for research on Polish early music, and the Order of the First Class Work Banner (1951) in connection with the 50th anniversary of musicological activity.

== Bibliography ==
- Biogramy uczonych polskich, Część I: Nauki społeczne, zeszyt 1: A-J, Wrocław 1983
- Małgorzata Sieradz Kwartalnik Muzyczny (1928-1950) a początki muzykologii polskiej, Warszawa 2015
- "Adolf Chybiński". Archived from the original on 2018-09-04.
- Michał Piekarski Przerwany kontrapunkt Adolf Chybiński i początki polskiej muzykologii we Lwowie 1912-1944. ISBN 978-83-754-5759-9
