= Jeżewski =

Jeżewski is a Polish surname. Notable people with the surname include:

- Alfons Jeżewski (1914–1983), Polish sprint canoer
- Christophe Jeżewski (born 1939), Polish poet, musicologist, essayist, and translator
