= Zygmunt Szweykowski =

Zygmunt Szweykowski may refer to:

- Zygmunt Szweykowski (historian) (1894–1978), Polish historian, father of Szweykowski (1894–1978)
- Zygmunt Szweykowski (musicologist) (1929–2023), Polish musicologist, son of Szweykowski (1929–2023)
