= Jerzy Fitelberg =

Polish-American composer

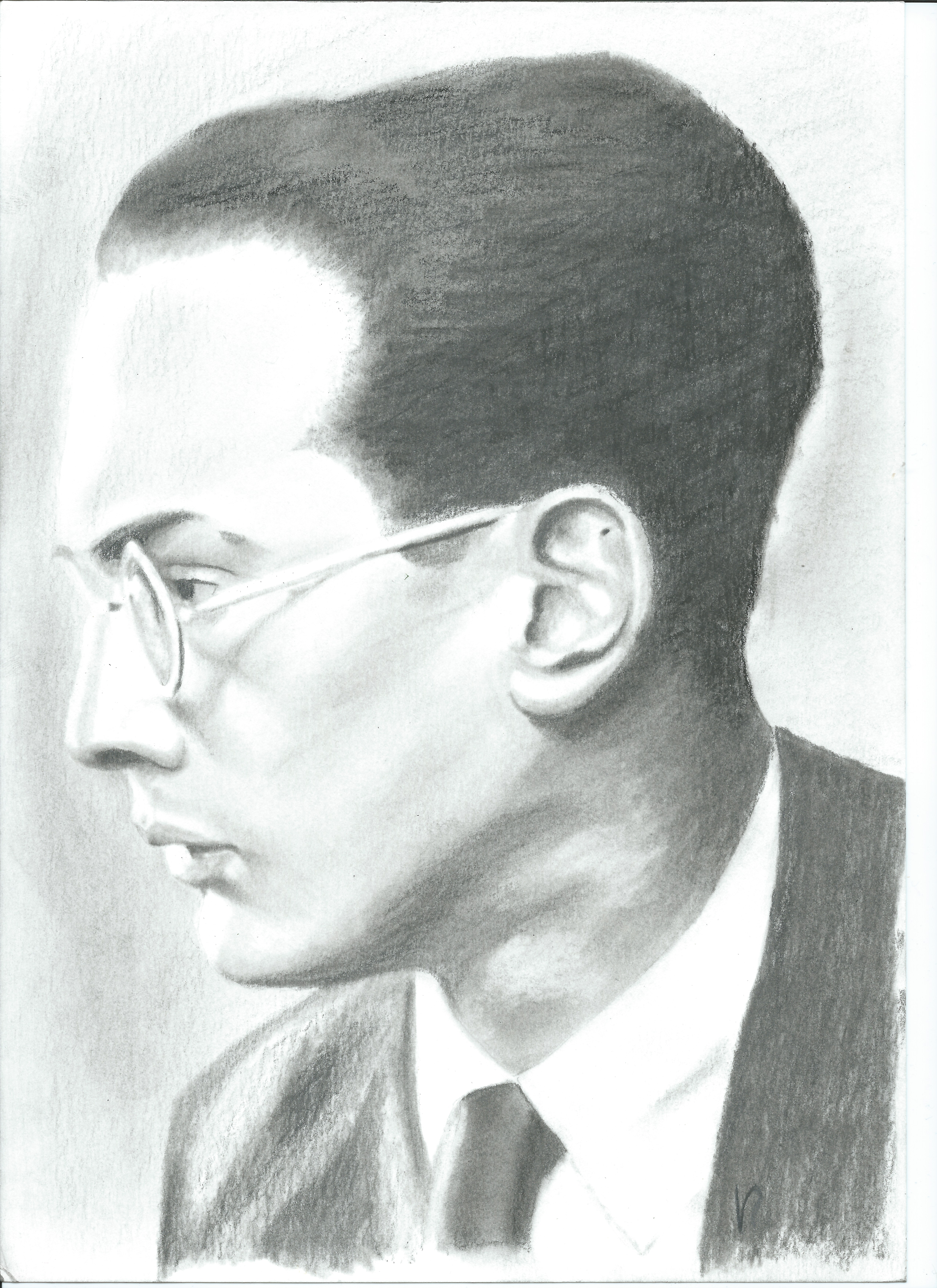
Jerzy Fitelberg

Jerzy Fitelberg (May 20, 1903 – April 25, 1951) was a Polish-American composer.

== Biography ==
Son of Grzegorz Fitelberg, Jerzy was born in Warsaw. He first studied music with his father. At a young age, his father had him play percussion in the orchestra of the National Theatre, Warsaw to gain experience. He subsequently studied in Moscow.

From 1922–1926 he studied composition with Walter Gmeindl and Franz Schreker at the Berlin University of the Arts. In 1923 the University helped him get a deferment for the Polish military draft .

In 1927 he re-orchestrated Arthur Sullivan's music for „The Mikado” for Erik Charell's re-staging as an operetta-revue in Berlin's Grosses Schauspielhaus. (Review in the Times (London) September 2, 1927)

In 1928, his String Quartet no. 2 won first prize in a competition organized by the Association of Young Polish Musicians in Paris.

His first violin concerto made a major impression on the 1929 International Society for Contemporary Music concert. Music critic Henry Prunieres remarked „The violin concerto...[was] delicate, sensitive with a fine feeling for orchestral resource.” His works were heard at subsequent ISCM concerts of 1931, 1937, 1946 and 1951.

Escaping the Nazis, he first traveled to Paris in 1933. There his music was published by Editions Max Eschig. His String Quartet no. 4 won the Elizabeth Sprague Coolidge Award administered by the Library of Congress. The work had its premiere on April 9, 1937 at the Library of Congress.

He then emigrated to New York City, arriving on May 15, 1940. Among the first works he composed in his new city were those reminiscent of Poland. In 1945, his fifth string quartet was awarded with a prize from the American Academy of Arts and Letters.

His application for US Citizenship was filed on May 26, 1947. At the time he was living at 244 West 72nd Street in New York City.

He died in New York in 1951.

== Style ==
Fitelberg said that his style of composition was similar to "the energy and high voltage music of Stravinsky, a focus on linear and harmonic complexity as in Hindemith, and colors of contemporary French music (such as Milhaud), as well as styles of satire.

== Legacy ==
Jerzy Fitelberg's manuscripts are housed in the Music Division of The New York Public Library for the Performing Arts.

== List of works ==
=== Operas ===
- Henny Penny

=== Orchestral works ===
- Suite No. 1 (1925)
- Suite No. 2 (1928)
- Concerto for Strings (1930) - transcription of the "String Quartet No. 2" (1928)
- Concert Piece (1937)
- The Golden Horn (1942)
- Epitaph (1943)
- Nocturne (1944)
- Polish Pictures, suite (1946)
- Symphony for Strings (1946)
- Sinfonietta (1946)
- Concert Overture (wind orchestra)
- Der schlechtgefesselte Prometheus, (suite from a ballet)
- Symphony No. 1 (?)
- Symphony No. 2 (?)

=== Concertante works ===
- Violin Concerto No. 1 (1928; rev. 1947)
- Piano Concerto No. 1 (1929)
- Cello Concerto (1931)
- Piano Concerto No. 2 (1934; rev. 1950)
- Violin Concerto No. 2 (1938)
- Concerto for Trombone, Piano and Strings (1947)
- Clarinet Concerto (1948)

=== Choral works ===
- Three Polish Folksongs

=== Chamber music ===
- Quintetto (flute, oboe, clarinet, bass clarinet, trombone) (1929)
- Sonatine for 2 violins (1935)
- Sonata, 2 violins, 2 pianos (1938)
- String Quartet No. 1 (1926)
- String Quartet No. 2 (1928)
- String Quartet No. 3 (1936)
- String Quartet No. 4 (1936)
- String Quartet No. 5 (1945)
- Serenade (Viola, piano), 1943
- Serenade (violin, double bass)
- Seven Caprices for viola and piano (1944)
- Capriccio (flute, oboe, B♭ clarinet, bass clarinet, trombone or bassoon) (1948)
- Concerta da camera (violin, piano)
- Duo (violin, cello) (1948)
- Sonata (solo violoncello) (1948)
- Sonata No. 1 for piano (1933)
- Suite for organ (1949)
- 3 Mazurkas (piano) (1932)
- What is Benjamin?: a musical tale for children to read and to play on the piano (1950)

=== Film music ===
- Poland Fights On (1943)
- Pre-war Poland (1945)

== As author ==
- Fitelberg, Jerzy. "Aspects of instrumentation today." Modern Music vol. 9, no. 31 (Nov.-Dec. 1931), p. 28-30.
- Fitelberg, Jerzy. "News from overseas." Modern Music vol. 23, no. 1 (Winter 1946), p. 42-44.
- Fitelberg, Jerzy. "Forecast and review." Modern Music vol. 9, no. 4 (May – Jun. 1932), p. 184-87.
