= Halina Szmolcówna =

Polish ballet dancer (1892–1939)

- Halina Szmolc
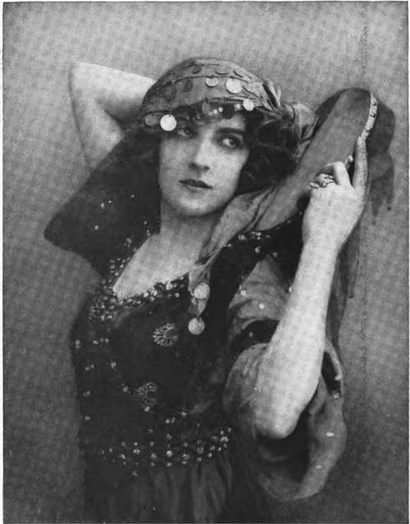
- A portrait of Szmolz featured in Munsey's Magazine whilst she was a character dancer with the Pavlova-Mordkin Russian Ballet, 1911
- Other names: Halina Szmolc-Fitelberg
- Parents: Ignatz Szmolz (father); Barbara Szmolcówna (mother)
- Born: Halina Schmolz; December 25, 1892; Warsaw, Warsaw Governorate, Congress Poland
- Died: September 28, 1939 (aged 46); Warsaw, Second Polish Republic
- Cause of death: Injuries sustained during the bombing of Warsaw
- Spouse: Grzegorz Fitelberg
- Dancing career
- Former groups: Warsaw Theatre Directorate
- Dances: Ballet

Halina Szmolcówna was the stage name of Halina Schmolz (25 December 1892 – 28 September 1939), a Polish ballet dancer.

== Early life ==
Schmolz was the daughter of Ignatz Szmolz and Barbara Szmolcówna. She trained as a dancer in Warsaw.

== Career ==
Schmolz first appeared on stage in London in 1910, in the company of Anna Pavlova and Mikhail Mordkin. In 1911 and 1912, she danced in the United States, including New York and Philadelphia, with Alexandre Volinin. "Alone, or in company, she flitted through the most amazing and fascinating gyrations," a North Carolina newspaper marvelled. She toured Australia and New Zealand in 1913, billed as a member of the Imperial Russian Ballet, with Volonin, Vlasta Novotna, Adeline Genée and others.

Schmolz appeared in the short film, Spiew labedzi, in 1914. She was performing in Russia in 1915 and 1916, then on tour again with Sergei Diaghilev in 1918 and 1919, in Paris and London. She was regularly seen at the Grand Theatre, and was the prima ballerina of the Warsaw Opera until 1934. She also taught dance at her home in the Saska Kępa neighbourhood, and at the T. Wysocka Stage Dance School in Warsaw.

== Personal life ==
In 1928, Schmolz became the second wife of Grzegorz Fitelberg, a composer and conductor with the Warsaw National Philharmonic Orchestra. In 1939, she was wounded near the couple's home during an attack on the Poniatowski Bridge during the aerial bombardment of Warsaw; she died a few weeks later at the age of 46. Her home in Saska Kępa has been restored in recent years.
