= Zofia Lissa =

Polish musicologist and music educator

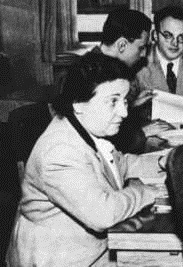
Zofia Lissa

Zofia Lissa (19 October 1908 – 26 March 1980) was a Polish music educator and musicologist.

== Life ==
Zofia Lissa was born in Lemberg and studied piano and music theory at the Polish Music Society in Lviv. She continued her studies in musicology with Adolf Chybiński at Jan Kazimierz University in Lvov (1924–1929), where she also studied philosophy with Kazimierz Twardowski and Roman Ingarden and attended lectures on psychology and art history. In 1929 she received a Ph.D., writing her dissertation on Harmonies of Alexander Scriabin. After completing her studies, she taught music theory at the Lviv Conservatory, Karol Szymanowski's music school and the Frédéric Chopin music school in Lviv, and also conducted research on the musicality of children and adolescents at the Institute of Psychology in Lviv. She wrote the first Polish work on film music, Music and Video in 1937.

After the annexation of Lviv to the Soviet Union at the outbreak of World War II, she worked in Radio Lviv, and in 1940 served as dean of the faculty in music theory at the Lviv Conservatory. In 1941, after the Nazi attack on the Lwow, she was relocated to Namangan, Uzbekistan, where she worked as a music teacher. In 1943 she was one of the first to join the Union of Polish Patriots. While in Moscow, she organized radio concerts, wrote reviews of Polish music concerts and published song books and sheet music including Songbook of Polish Children in the USSR (1944), a Polish Soldier Songbook (1944) and Songs and Games for the Polish Kindergarten in the USSR (1945). After the war she remained in Moscow, where she was offered the position of cultural attaché at the Polish embassy.

In 1947 Lissa returned to Warsaw and took a position as deputy director of the Department of Music at the Ministry of Culture and the Arts, where she addressed research activities and music culture. In 1947, she received an appointment at the Adam Mickiewicz University in Poznań. In 1948 she organized the Department of Musicology at the University of Warsaw and from 1958 to 1975 served as its director. In 1951 she received the title of associate professor and in 1957 full professor at the university. Under her leadership the institute was active in sponsoring meetings and conferences, including a Prokofiewowska Session (1959), the first international congress on Chopin (1960) and a session dedicated to the work of Karol Szymanowski (1962).

Lissa initiated the organization of the Musica Antiqua Europae Orientalis Festival in Bydgoszcz (1963) and the accompanying international musicological congress, which she chaired. In 1966 with Jerome Feicht, she organized a documentation center and initiated an inventory of early Polish music which resulted in the issue of the series Antiquitates Musicae in Polonia. During her studies, she became involved with left-wing circles and actively participated in the ideological debate on the aesthetics and methodology of Marxist approaches to musicology.

She was a board member (1947–1948) and Vice President (1949–1954) of the Polish Composers' Union, and through her initiative, the Polish Composers' Union admitted musicologists. She was a member of the presidium of the International Musicological Society (1965–1977) and in 1955 was a corresponding member of the Academy of Arts, Berlin, in 1963 the Sächsische Akademie der Wissenschaften in Leipzig, and in 1972 the Akademie der Wissenschaften und der Literatur in Mainz.

Her research interests included the history and music theory, history and aesthetics of music, the methodology of history and music theory and history of contemporary Polish music. Her works are in large part testimony to the era in which they were generated, and controversial because methodological approach was based on Marxist ideology. Zofia Lissa introduced a new approach into Polish musicological literature, considering musical styles in their mutual relationships and emphasizing the social functions of music. A bibliography of her work includes nearly 600 items, including several books, dozens of monographs and hundreds of articles, many of which have been translated into foreign languages. She died in Warsaw.

== Honors and awards ==
For her work, Lissa was honored with the Award of the Polish Composers Union (1950), Order of Polonia Restituta, Knight's Cross (1952), the Second Degree State Prize (1953), Prize from the Committee for Radio and Television (1966), Silver Medal at the Venice Biennale (1969), Award of the Ministry of Higher Education (1965 and 1977), Grade II (1971 and 1976) and the International Music Council Award (1979).

== Publications ==
Lissa was highly prolific, publishing articles, monographs and texts including:

- An outline of the science of music: the National Department, National Institute, Lviv 1934
- Music and film: Study on the borderline of ontology, aesthetics and psychology of film music, Books Lviv, Lviv 1937
- Remarks about the method: From the methodological issues of modern musicology, PIS, Warsaw 1950
- Polish musicology at the turn: Hearing and critical scientific articles (written in the years 1947–1951), PWM, Kraków 1952
- Some aspects of musical aesthetics in the light of articles by Joseph Stalin on Marxism in linguistics, Kraków 1952
- Polish Renaissance music [co-author: Joseph M. Chomiński], PIW, Warszawa 1953
- The special nature of music, PWM [print], Kraków 1953
- The objectivity of rights in Marxist history and theory of music, PWM, Kraków 1954
- Rise of the scholars: Tadeusz Szeligowski, PWM, Kraków 1955
- The history of Russian music, PWM, Kraków 1955
- Vocal music in the first half of the seventeenth century, [co-author: Vladimir Pozniak], in: Universal History of Music, Volume 1 (edited by Joseph M. Chomiński, Zofia Lissa), PWM, Kraków 1957
- Aesthetics of film music, PWM, Kraków 1964
- Sketches from the aesthetics of music [a collection of studies from the years 1938-1964], Kraków 1965
- Studies on the work of Frédéric Chopin, PWM, Kraków 1970
- Introduction to Musicology, PWN, Warszawa 1970 (second edition 1974)
- Polonica Beethoven, PWM, Kraków 1970
- New drafts of the aesthetics of music [a collection of studies from the years 1968-1973], PWM, Kraków 1975
