= Janusz Wawrowski =

- Born: 22 March 1982 (age 44); Konin, Poland
- Genres: Classical
- Instrument: Violin
- Label: Warner Music Group
- Website: www.wawrowski.com

Janusz Wawrowski (born March 22, 1982) is a Polish violinist, lecturer at the Chopin University of Music in Warsaw, and director of multiple violin festivals.

== Biography ==
Wawrowski began playing the violin at the age of 6. He attended the Henryk Wieniawski Music School in Poznań and went on to study at the Chopin University of Music in Warsaw. In his younger life Wawrowski was the student of Mirosław Ławrynowicz, Yair Kless, and Salvatore Accardo. Janusz Wawrowski has performed as a soloist at concerts in the Berlin Philharmonic, Musikverein in Vienna, National Philharmonic in Warsaw, Lithuanian National Philharmonic in Vilnius, Moscow State Tchaikovsky Conservatory in Moscow, Tel Aviv Music Center, Teatro Teresa Carreno in Caracas, and the Stuttgart Philharmonic.

Throughout his career he has collaborated with conductors such as Conrad van Alphen, Łukasz Borowicz, Gabriel Chmura, Mykola Diadiura, Agnieszka Duczmal, Jacek Kaspszyk, Jerzy Maksymiuk, Tomáš Netopil, Juozas Domarkas, Daniel Raiskin, and Antoni Wit.

In 2013 Wawrowski defended his doctoral dissertation in musical arts at the Chopin University of Music in Warsaw. He is currently a lecturer at this university in the department of instrumental studies.

Wawrowski is the director of violin competitions such as Muzyka na Szczytach in Zakopane (2009–2010) and Muzyczne Przestrzenie in Greater-Poland (since 2011).

Wawrowski plays on the first and only Polish-owned Stradivarius since the Second World War. The violin, named Polonia, was gifted to him by Polish business magnate Roman Ziemian. The instrument is said to have been built in1685, and is one of Antonio Stradivari's best preserved violins which are still in use today. In an interview, Wawrowski stated that Polonia was purchased for around 20 million PLN (about 5 million €).

== Awards ==
In recognition of his achievements in music Wawrowski was awarded with the title of Meritorious for Polish Culture, by the Polish Ministry of Culture and National Heritage in 2015. Throughout his career he has received many scholarships from the Polish Ministry of Culture.

Wawrowski has participated in many local and international violin competitions. In 1996 he received the 1st place award at the Polish National Contest for Young Violinist's in Lublin as well as the 2nd place award in the International Violin Competition im. Rodziny Grobliczów in Kraków. Wawrowski won the 3rd place award twice, at the International Competition for Young Violinists in Kloster Schoental, Germany in 1997, and the 3rd place award at the Louis Spohr International Competition for Young Violinists in Freiburg, Germany in 2000. In 2006 he claimed the 3rd place prize at the International Violin Competition dedicated to David Oistrakh in Odesa, Ukraine.

Wawrowski is a two-time recipient of the Polish Fryderyk music award. He was award his first Fryderk in 2017 for his album Sequenza and the second in 2019 for Hidden Violin. Sequenza was later nominated for the International Classical Music Awards in 2018.

== Discography ==
- 2007: Niccolò Paganini: 24 Caprices Op. 1 (CD Accords)
- 2016: Niccolò Paganini: 24 Caprices Op. 1 (reissue by Warner Classics)
- 2016: Sequenza: Luciano Berio, Bjarne Brustad, Grażyna Bacewicz, Krzysztof Penderecki, Eugène Ysaÿe, Tomasz Opałka, and Dariusz Przybylski (Warner Classics)
- 2017: Brillante with Stuttgart Philharmonic Orchestra: Wieniawski's Violin Concerto No. 2, Max Bruch's Scottisch Fantasy (Warner Classics)
- 2019: Hidden Violin with José Gallardo: Henryk Wieniawski, Grażyna Bacewicz, Karol Szymanowski, Ignacy Paderewski, and Mieczysław Karłowicz (Warner Classics)
