= Vlasta Novotna =

Czech dancer in the Mariinsky Imperial Ballet (born 1890s)

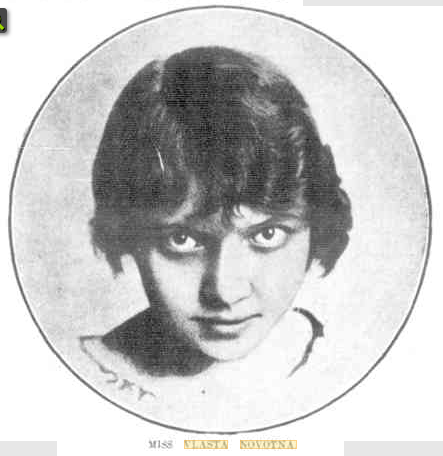
Vlasta Novotna, from a 1914 publication.

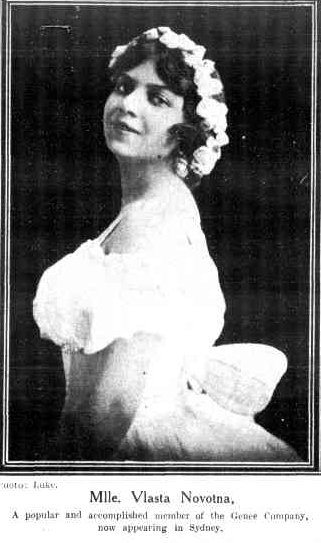
Vlasta Novotna, from a 1913 publication.

Vlasta Novotna (born 1890s) was a Czech dancer billed as a member of the Imperial Russian Ballet, but more often seen in variety and comic opera programs.

== Early life ==
Vlasta Novotna was born in Prague. She was often described as a protégée of Emmy Destinn.

== Career ==
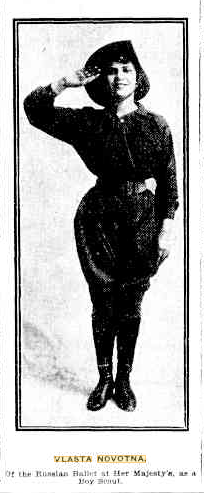
Vlasta Novotna posing in a Boy Scout costume, from a 1913 publication.

Novotna danced in La Belle Paree on Broadway in 1911, and in Ein Walzertraum at the Irving Place Theatre; the following year, she was in the revue From Broadway to Paris. In 1913, she toured Australia and New Zealand billed as a member of the Imperial Russian Ballet, one of Les Sylphides with Adeline Genée and Halina Schmolz. In 1914 and 1915, she returned to Australia, where she danced with the J. C. Williamson Comic Opera Company in Gipsy Love, Princess Caprice, The Count of Luxembourg and High Jinks. She also performed at a benefit for the Thespians War Fund. She told an Australian newspaper that "I love my work. The dance to me is the very air I breathe."

Later in 1915, she presented a dance show in New York, based on her idea of Australian and Polynesian native dances. The show was considered remarkable for her exotic and minimal costumes. A Honolulu newspaper was not impressed with her interpretation of the hula, noting "The society dancer terms her creation Hawaiian, but people in the islands will recognize little in it save perhaps the costume, which would appear to be that of the hula, with some picturesque additions".

In 1916 she danced at a New York benefit for the Montenegrin Relief Association of America. She also developed a seven-part program called "The Dance of the War Bride", and danced at the Metropolitan Opera House.
