= Ludomir Różycki =

Polish composer and conductor

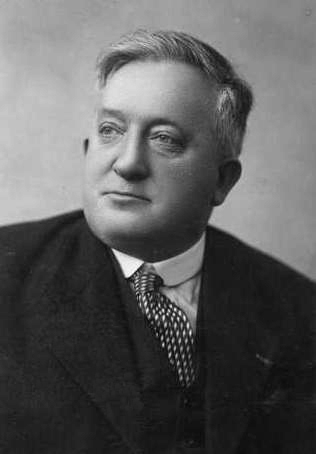
- Różycki, early 1930s
- Born: 18 September 1883; Warsaw, Congress Poland
- Died: 1 January 1953 (aged 69); Katowice, Poland
- Education: Warsaw Conservatory
- Occupations: Conductor, pedagogue

Ludomir Różycki (Polish: [luˈdɔmir ruˈʐɨt͡skʲi]; 18 September 1883 Warsaw – 1 January 1953 Katowice) was a Polish composer, conductor and pedagogue. He was, with Mieczysław Karłowicz, Karol Szymanowski and Grzegorz Fitelberg, a member of the group of composers known as Young Poland, the intention of which was to invigorate the musical culture of their generation in their mother country.

== Life ==
He was a son of a professor at the Warsaw Conservatory, where he studied piano and composition. He completed his studies with distinction, and then continued his studies in Berlin at the Academy of Music under Engelbert Humperdinck. He began his musical career as a conductor of opera and professor of piano in Lwów in 1907. It was while in Lwów that he began to compose. Subsequently, he moved to Warsaw but had to flee during the Warsaw Uprising. After the war, he lived and taught in Katowice.

== Music ==
Różycki's ballet Pan Twardowski (1920) was the first Polish large-scale ballet to be performed abroad, being seen in Copenhagen, Prague, Brno, Zagreb, Belgrade and Vienna, and being performed over 800 times in Warsaw. His eight operas included Casanova and Eros i Psyche (Eros and Psyche, to the libretto of Jerzy Żuławski), the latter having its world premiere in Wrocław in 1917.

All his solo piano works have been recorded on three CDs by Valentina Seferinova, and issued on the Polish Acte Préalable label (catalogue reference AP 0263, AP 0438, AP 0580) as world premiere recordings.

Hyperion Records have released recordings of his two piano concertos, his piano quintet and his string quartet.

In 1944 Różycki began writing a violin concerto but had to leave the manuscript buried in his garden when he fled Warsaw. Discovered years later by construction workers, the score ended up in the archives of the National Library of Poland. Violinist Janusz Wawrowski later restored the work, performed the premiere in 2018, and released a recording in 2021.

== Awards and decorations ==
- Order of the Banner of Labour, 1st Class (22 July 1949)
- Commander's Cross with Star of the Order of Polonia Restituta (17 January 1951)
- Officer's Cross of Order of Polonia Restituta (7 November 1925)
- Gold Cross of Merit (twice: 5 May 1931 and 18 January 1946)
- Gold Academic Laurel (7 November 1936)
- Commander of the Order of the Crown of Romania (Romania, 1923)

== See also ==
- Music of Poland
- List of Poles
