= Jacek Różycki =

Polish composer (1635–1703/04)

Jacek Hyancithus Różycki (also Rozycki, Rożycki, Rositsky, Ruziski; first name also Hyacinthus, ?Sebastian; c.1635 – 1703/1704 (precise date unknown)) was a Polish composer of Baroque music.

Różycki was born in Łęczyca. He began his musical career in the court orchestra of Władysław IV. Eventually he took over the function of the director (Kapellmeister) of the court musical ensemble. Uniquely, he ended up serving that function at the court of four different Polish monarchs; Władysław, Michał Korybut Wiśniowiecki, Jan III Sobieski, and August II. As a royal compositor he also held the office of royal secretary. He died in Warsaw.

His most famous works include: Magnificat, Confiteor, and Magnificemus in cantico.
