= Symphony No. 1 (Khachaturian) =

1934 symphony composed by Aram Khachaturian

- by Aram Khachaturian
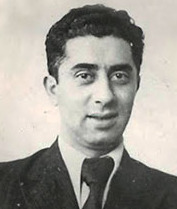
- Aram Khachaturian in 1936
- Form: Symphony
- Composed: 1934
- Duration: 43 minutes

Premiere
- Date: 20 March 1935
- Location: Moscow, Soviet Union
- Conductor: Eugen Szenkar
- Performers: Moscow Philharmonic Orchestra

The Symphony No. 1 in E minor is a 1934 composition by Armenian composer Aram Khachaturian. It was written as a thesis piece for his graduation from the Moscow Conservatory in 1934. The piece was premiered by German conductor Eugen Szenkar and the Moscow Philharmonic Orchestra on 20 March 1935, in Moscow. He later revised the piece in 1960 and re-published it in 1962.

The piece was composed in commemoration of Armenia's 15th year under Soviet rule and is in 3 movements. Movement I is Andante maestoso con passione, Movement II is Adagio sostenuto, and Movement III is Allegro risoluto. The piece is considered the "first Armenian symphony".

== Instrumentation ==
The piece is orchestrated for 2 flutes, piccolo, english horn, 2 clarinets, bass clarinet, 2 bassoons, 4 french horns, 3 trumpets, 3 trombones, tuba, timpani, harp, piano, string orchestra, and a percussion section (triangle, woodblock, tambourine, snare drum, bass drum, cymbals, tam-tam, tubular bells, glockenspiel, and xylophone).
