= Zygmunt Szweykowski (musicologist) =

Polish musicologist and academic (1929–2023)

- Szweykowski in 2013
- Born: Zygmunt Marian Szweykowski; 12 May 1929; Kraków, Poland
- Died: 3 August 2023 (aged 94); Kraków, Poland
- Occupations: Musicologist; academic
- Known for: Polish and Italian music scholarship

Academic background
- Education: University of Poznań; Jagiellonian University

Academic work
- Discipline: Renaissance and Baroque music
- Institutions: Jagiellonian University

Zygmunt Marian Szweykowski (12 May 1929 – 3 August 2023) was a Polish musicologist and academic. Described as "one of the leading Polish musicologists of his generation", Szweykowski specialized in Renaissance and Baroque music, particularly that of Poland and Italy. His career was primarily spent at Jagiellonian University and he was closely associated with the PWM Edition publisher.

== Life and career ==
Zygmunt Marian Szweykowski was born in Kraków, the Second Polish Republic, on 12 May 1929. He was the son of Zygmunt Szweykowski, a literary historian, and Antonina Szweykowski, née Janiszewska. The Szweykowskis lived in Warsaw during World War II, following which they moved to Częstochowa. The younger Szweykowski studied musicology under Adolf Chybiński at the University of Poznań, graduating in 1951. He obtained his doctoral degree under Józef Michał Chomiński at Jagiellonian University, Kraków, in 1964; his dissertation was on the "concertato technique" of Baroque Polish music.

After working as Chybiński's assistant in Poznań from 1950 to 1953, Szweykowski returned to Kraków as editor of the PWM Edition music publisher from 1954 to 1961. Simultaneously he was an assistant at Jagiellonian University from 1954 to 1963, and then assistant professor there from 1964 to 1970. Initially from the insistence of musicologist Stefania Łobaczewska, Szweykowski gradually achieved higher positions at Jagiellonian University: assistant professor (1964–1970); musicology department head (from 1970); reader (1971–1989); a habilitation degree (1987); and full professor (from 1990). Szweykowski died on 3 August 2023 in Kraków, at the age of 94.

The musicologist Mirosław Perz described as Szweykowski "one of the leading Polish musicologists of his generation". Szweykowski specialized in the music history of Poland and Italy, particularly Renaissance and Baroque music. Perz noted that he discovered "many unknown Polish compositions and sources concerning Polish musical culture". Among the composers he wrote on were Mikołaj Gomółka, Grzegorz Gerwazy Gorczycki, Marcin Mielczewski, Jan Staromiejski and Wacław of Szamotuły. His "highly regarded" editions of Polish music include numerous anthologies on a variety of old Polish music.

Throughout his career, Szweykowski was a member of numerous music organizations: the Polish Composers' Union (from 1955), the American Musicological Society and the Accademia Filarmonica di Bologna (honorary member). His national awards included the Cross of Merit, the Order of Polonia Restituta and the Medal of the National Education Commission.

== Selected writings ==
for other writings see Perz 2001 and his Jagiellonian University Profile

Books

- Szweykowski, Zygmunt (1957). Kultura wokalna XVI-wiecznej Polski [16th-century Vocal Culture]. Kraków: Biblioteka Słuchacza Koncertowego.
- —— (1964). Technika koncertująca w polskiej muzyce wokalno–instrumentalnej okresu baroku [Concertato technique in Polish vocal and instrumental music of the Baroque] (doctoral). Kraków: Jagiellonian University.
- —— (1977). Musica Moderna w ujęciu Marka Scacchiego [Musica Moderna as Interpreted by Mark Scacchi]. Kraków: PWM Edition.
- —— (1992–1994). Między kunsztem a ekspresją [Between Virtuosity and Expression] (in Polish). Kraków: Musica Iagellonica. Translated by Anna Szweykowska
  - —— (1992). Florencja [Florence] (in Polish). Vol. 1. Kraków: Musica Iagellonica. ISBN 978-83-233-0561-3. OCLC 1424107869.
  - —— (1994). Rzym [Rome] (in Polish). Vol. 2. Kraków: Musica Iagellonica. ISBN 978-83-7099-009-1. OCLC 835376176.

Articles

- Szweykowski, Zygmunt (1961). "Z zagadnień melodyki w polskiej muzyce wokalno–instrumentalnej późnego baroku" [Problems of Melody in Polish Vocal and Instrumental Music of the Late Baroque]. Muzyka (in Polish). 6 (2): 53–78.
- ——; Szweykowska, Anna (1964). "Wacław z Szamotuł, renesansowy muzyk i poeta" [Wacław of Szamotuł, Renaissance musician and poet]. Muzyka (in Polish). 9 (1–2): 3–28.
- —— (1966). "Próba periodyzacji okresu baroku w Polsce" [An Attempt at the Periodization of the Polish Baroque]. Muzyka (in Polish). 11 (1): 17–26.
- —— (January 1970). "Tradition and Popular Elements in Polish Music of the Baroque Era". The Musical Quarterly. 56 (1): 99–115. doi:10.1093/mq/LVI.1.99. JSTOR 741147.
- —— (1971). ""Ah dolente partita": Monteverdi – Scacchi". Quadrivium (in Italian). 12 (2): 59–76.
- —— (1972). "Poglądy Scacchiego na muzykę jako sztukę" [Scacchi’s views on music as art]. Pagine. 1: 17–28.
- —— (1973). "Czy istnieje manieryzm, jako okres historii muzyki?" [Does mannerism exist as a period in music history?]. Muzyka (in Polish). 18 (1): 32–39.
- —— (1973). "Jan Brant (1544–1602) i jego nowoodkryta twórczość muzyczna" [Jan Brant and his newly discovered musical production]. Muzyka (in Polish). 18 (2): 43–72.
- —— (1974). "'Stile imbastardito' i 'stile rappresentativo' w systemie teoretycznym Marka Scacchiego" ['Stile imbastardito' and 'stile rappresentativo' in the Theoretical System of Mark Scacchi]. Muzyka (in Polish). 19 (1): 11–34.
- —— (1975). "Le messe di Giovanni Francesco Anerio ed il loro rapporto con l'attività del compositore in Polonia" [The Masses of Giovanni Francesco Anerio and their Relationship with the Composer's Activity in Poland]. Quadrivium (in Italian). 16: 145–52.
- —— (1983). "Ideał muzyki starożytnej w praktyce kompozytorskiej wczesnego seicenta" [The Ideal of Ancient Music in the Compositional Practice of the Early 17th Century]. Muzyka (in Polish). 28 (4): 3–26.
- ——; Szweykowska, Anna (1983). "'Rappresentazione di Anima et di Corpo' Cavalierego: muzyka dla sceny" [Cavalieri's Rappresentatione di Anima, et di Corpo: Music for the Stage]. Muzyka (in Polish). 28 (1): 13–66.
- —— (1984). "Nieznana wersja motetu 'Mihi autem' Marcina Leopolity" [An Unknown Version of Leopolita's Motet 'Mihi autem']. Muzyka (in Polish). 29 (4): 23–34.
- —— (1985). "Krytyka kontrapunktu w 'Dialogo della musica antica et della moderna' Vincenza Galilei" [The Critique of Counterpoint in Vincenzo Galilei's Dialogo della musica antica et della moderna]. Muzyka (in Polish). 30 (3–4): 3–16.
- —— (1986). "Giulio Caccini wobec teorii Cameraty Florenckiej" [Giulio Caccini in relation to the theory of the Florentine Camerata]. Muzyka (in Polish). 31 (1): 51–65.
- —— (1988). "Giulio Caccini: kodyfikator nowego wykonawstwa figur ozdobnych" [Giulio Caccini: codifier of the new manner of performing ornamental figures]. Muzyka (in Polish). 33 (1): 95–122.
- —— (1988). "'Sprezzatura' and 'Grazia': a Key to the Vocal Art in the Early Baroque Period". Polish Art Studies. 9: 153–165.
- —— (1996). "Marco Scacchi and Angelo Berardi about Polychorality". Musica Iagellonica. 2.
- —— (2001). "Chybiński, Adolf". Grove Music Online (8th ed.). Oxford: Oxford University Press. ISBN 978-1-56159-263-0. (subscription, Wikilibrary access, or UK public library membership required)

Editions

- Szweykowski, Zygmunt, ed. (1956). Waclaw Z Szamotul (d. c. 1560): Songs for 4-v cappella. Vol. 28. interpretation indications by Stanislaw Wiechowicz (Editions of Early Polish Music ed.). Kraków: PWM Edition.
- ——, ed. (1956). Canzona a 2, doi Violini e Basso (Organ). Vol. 29. figured bass realized by Kazimierz Sikorski, violin parts edited by Tadeusz Ochlewski (Editions of Early Polish Music ed.). Kraków: PWM Edition.
- ——, ed. (1964). Muzyka w dawnym Krakowie; Wybór utworów xv-xviii w. [Music in old Kraków; Selection of Works, XVth–XVIIIth Centuries]. Kraków: PWM Edition. OCLC 2531788.
- ——, ed. (1969–1982). Musicalia vetera: katalog tematyczny rękopiśmiennych zabytków dawnej muzyki w Polsce [Musicalia Vetera: Thematic Catalogue of Early Musical Manuscripts in Poland]. Kraków: PWM Edition. ISBN 978-83-224-0204-7. OCLC 12132708.
