= Symphony in E minor (Karłowicz) =

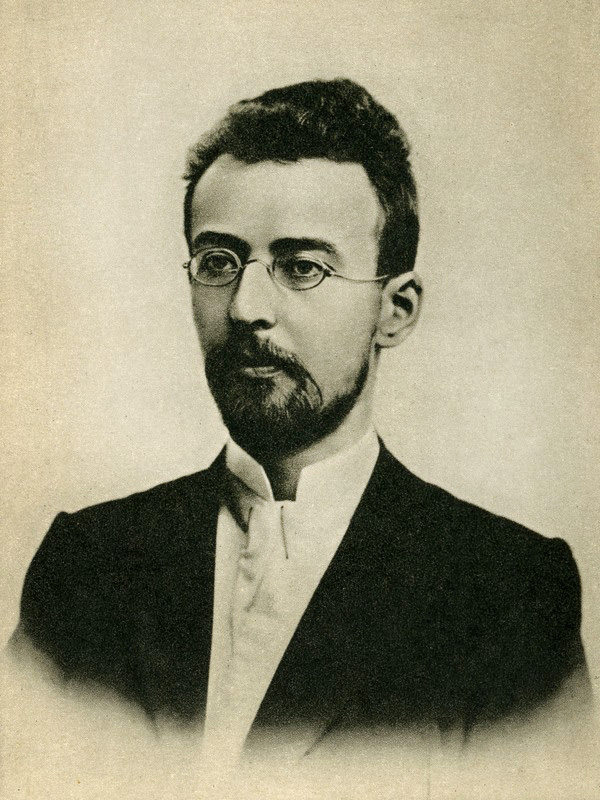
Mieczysław Karłowicz

The Symphony in E minor, Op. 7, Rebirth, is the only symphony written by Polish composer Mieczysław Karłowicz. Work on the symphony began in 1899 during the composer's studies in Berlin, and was finished in 1902 in Poland. It received its world premiere in 1903 in Berlin, and its Polish premiere the same year in Lwów.

== Music ==
The symphony is written for 3 flutes (third doubling piccolo), 2 oboes, 2 clarinets, 2 bassoons, 4 horns, 2 trumpets, 3 trombones, tuba, timpani, and strings.

It is divided into four movements:

1. Andante – Allegro
2. Andante non troppo
3. Vivace
4. Allegro maestoso
