= Christophe Jeżewski =

Christophe Jezewski, in Polish Krzysztof Andrzej Jeżewski (born 24 April 1939) is a poet, musicologist, essayist and translator of Polish descent who has been living in France since 1970.

== Biography ==
Christophe Jeżewski was born in Warsaw, in a Francophone family of humanistic tradition. His maternal grandfather Adam Czartkowski, a scientist and historian of culture, was the author of monographs on Chopin and Beethoven; His father was an anglicist and economist, and his mother Zofia Jeżewska - a writer, journalist, and art critic was also the author of four books on Chopin.

At an early age, he developed a passion for translation, which he considered as a bridge between cultures and peoples. At the age of sixteen, he translated the Chantefables et Chantefleurs by Robert Desnos. Later, while studying the Romance languages at the Warsaw University, he became one of the most active translators of French poetry (Segalen, Oscar Venceslas de Lubicz-Milosz, Michaux, René Char, Jean Follain, the surrealists, Eugène Guillevic, etc.) and Hispano-American. He introduced the Poles to some poetic geniuses of this continent: Jorge Luis Borges, José Gorostiza, Octavio Paz. At the same time, he continued his poetic work (beginning in 1968 in the magazine Poezja) and was a musical critic. He also began to translate Polish poetry into French, in particular Cyprian Norwid (1821–1883), the father of Polish modern poetry and great Christian thinker of whom John Paul II claimed inspiration. In 1963 he completed his studies of Romance philology at the Warsaw University.

In 1970, the political climate in Poland had become unbearable because of the wave of "red fascism", and he left thanks to a French government scholarship and settled permanently in France. From 1971 to 1973, he collaborated with the Polish staff for the ORTF which broadcast his 65 portraits of the most prominent French poets of the twentieth.

In 1976 he obtained his degree of Polish literature at the Paris-Sorbonne University and married Maria Thelma Noval, a painter, poet and sociologist from Philippines, of whom he had two children. Since 1978, he has made several stays in the Philippines.

Since 1974, he continues in France an intense activity as a translator of Polish literature, makes discover among others Cyprian Norwid, Witold Gombrowicz, Bruno Schulz, Andrzej Kuśniewicz, Czesław Miłosz (Nobel Prize in Literature 1980), Krzysztof Kamil Baczyński, Wisława Szymborska (Nobel Prize in Literature 1996) and composers Karol Szymanowski, Stanisław Moniuszko, Mieczysław Karłowicz. He collaborates with the Polish emigre press and the French music press, organizes "poetry and music" evenings and gives lectures on Polish culture and music. After the Martial law in Poland was established on 13 December 1981, he had in France a vast activity of information and propagation of the democratic and Christian ideas of Solidarność.

In 1984 he left Paris and settled with his family in Noisy-le-Grand where he lived until now. In autumn 1989 he obtained French nationality.

A specialist of Cyprian Norwid, he has been president of the Les Amis de C. K. Norwid Parisian association since 2003.

== Distinctions ==
- Scholarships for translation and creation of the CNL (1983, 1991, 1996, 2000, 2006, 2010, 2014)
- Karol Szymanowski medal (1984)
- Prize of the Society of Polish Authors and Composers ZAiKS (1987)
- C. Jelenski Prize of the literary Institute Kultura (1991)
- Scholarships from the Minister of Culture and the Polish National Heritage (1999, 2003, 2009)
- Prize of the Polish PEN-club (2007)
- Translation scholarship of the European Prize for Literature (2007)
- Silver Medal of the Gloria Artis (2011)
- Cyprian Norwid Foundation Medal (Lublin), (2013)
- Witold Hulewicz Prize (2019)
- APAJTE Prize (2019)
- Cyprian Kamil Norwid Prize (2021)

== Publications ==
=== Translations into French ===
- Cyprian Norwid, L'Intarissable source, Pierre-Guillaume de Roux, 2017
- Cyprian Norwid, Chopin/Szopen, Maison d'édition GAL, 2010
- John-Paul II, Mon dernier livre de méditations pour le troisième millénaire, Éditions du Rocher, 2008
- Tadeusz Różewicz, Regio et autres poèmes, Arfuyen 2008
- Cyprian Kamil Norwid, Cléopâtre et César : tragédie historique écrite aussi bien pour la scène que pour la lecture, avec une mise en valeur des gestes dramatiques et de leur succession, Cahiers bleus-Librairie bleue, 2006
- Krzysztof Kamil Baczyński, Testament de feu : poèmes, Arfuyen, 2006
- Krzysztof Kamil Baczyński, L'insurrection angélique, Le Cri édition : In'hui, 2004
- Cyprian Norwid, Vade-mecum Les Éditions Noir sur Blanc, 2004
- Anna Bolecka, Mon cher Franz, Sabine Wespieser éditeur, 2004
- John-Paul II, Mon livre de méditations pour ceux qui souffrent, qui doutent, qui espèrent, Éditions du Rocher, 2004
- Witold Gombrowicz, Souvenirs de Pologne, Éditions Gallimard, 2002
- Andrzej Czcibor-Piotrowski, Un amour couleur myrtilles, Éditions Robert Laffont, 2001
- Cyprian Norwid, Lumières du Royaume, Éditions Bénédictines, 2001
- Maria Nurowska, Celle qu'on aime, Éditions Phébus, 2000
- Tadeusz Kępiński, Witold Gombrowicz et le monde de sa jeunesse, Gallimard, 2000
- Cyprian Norwid, O Szopenie/Sur Chopin, Lodart, 1999
- Andrzej Kuśniewicz, Constellations : les Signes du zodiaque, 10-18, 1999
- Andrzej Kuśniewicz, Eroica, Éditions des Syrtes, 1999
- Andrzej Zaniewski, Mémoires d'un rat, Belfond, 1994 ISBN 978-2-7144-3210-0 Librairie générale française, 1998 ISBN 978-2-253-14411-3
- Maria Nurowska, Un amour de VarsovieEditions Albin Michel, 1996, France Loisirs, 1997, Editions de la Seine, 1998
- Wisława Szymborska, Dans le fleuve d'Héraclite, Maison de la poésie Nord-Pas-de-Calais, 1995
- Witold Gombrowicz, Journal. Tomes I à III, 1953–1969, Julliard, then Denoël 1976, then Christian Bourgois 1981, then Gallimard, 1995
- Witold Gombrowicz, Souvenirs de Pologne, Christian Bourgois, 1990, 1995
- Andrzej Kuśniewicz, Constellations : les signes du zodiaque, Robert Laffont, 1993
- Jerzy Andrzejewski, Les ténèbres couvrent la terre, Belfond, 1991
- Witold Gombrowicz, Moi et mon double, L'Œil de la lettre, 1990
- Witold Gombrowicz, Varia II, Christian Bourgois, 1989
- Czesław Miłosz, Terre inépuisable, Fayard, 1988
- Czesław Miłosz, Témoignage de la poésie, Presses universitaires de France, 1987
- Andrzej Kuśniewicz, L'État d'apesanteur, Albin Michel, 1979, then Librairie générale française, 1983
- Andrzej Kuśniewicz, La Leçon de langue morte, Albin Michel, 1981
- Andrzej Kuśniewicz, Le Roi des Deux-Siciles, Albin Michel, 1977

=== Poems and essays ===
- Music, Anima Poetry Press, 2017
- Księga snów/Le Livre des rêves, Éditions Polyglotte, 2013
- Swiatłość u progu, Topos, 2012
- Płomień i noc/ La Flamme et la nuit, Adam Marszałek, 2012
- Cyprian Norwid et la pensée de l'Empire du Milieu,L'Harmattan, 2011
- Cyprian Norwid a myśl i poetyka Kraju Srodka, Wydawnictwa Uniwersytetu Warszawskiego, 2011
- Adam Czartkowski, Beethoven. Próba portretu duchowego. Rozszerzył, opracował i antologią polskich wierszy o kompozytorze opatrzył Krzysztof Andrzej Jeżewski, PIW, 2010
- Le pire est certain. Anthologie de la poésie catastrophiste polonaise du XX, Zurfluh/Cahiers Bleus, 2009
- Druga księga snow, Miniatura, 2009
- W zaświecie snu, Correspondance des Arts, 2009
- Zagle niebieskie, Adam Marszałek, 2008
- Okruchy z wysokości, in: Angelus Silesius Anielski wędrowiec, Biblioteka Telgte, 2007
- Popiół słoneczny Nowy Swiat, 2005
- L'épreuve du feu; précédé de Les vignes de l'espace : poèmes, Librairie Bleue, 2005
- Cyprian Norwid, poète et penseur catholique, Liberté politique, 2001
- Kryształowy ogrod, Oficyna Krakowska, 2000
- Chopin, Szymanowski et leurs poètes = Chopin, Szymanowski i ich poeci, Librairie Bleue, 1999
- Znak pojednania, "W drodze", 1997
- Muzyka, Tikkun, 1995
- La musique : poèmes, L'Harmattan, 1994
- Księga snów Miniatura, 1990
- Próba ognia, Editions Dembinski, 1990

=== Other ===
He also translated into Polish many French poets of the 20th century, notably Victor Segalen, Oscar Milosz, Henri Michaux and René Char, as well as authors from other languages such as Octavio Paz, José Gorostiza, Jorge Luis Borges, Kathleen Raine, Angelus Silesius and Maya Noval.
