= Grzegorz Fitelberg =

Polish conductor and composer (1879–1953)

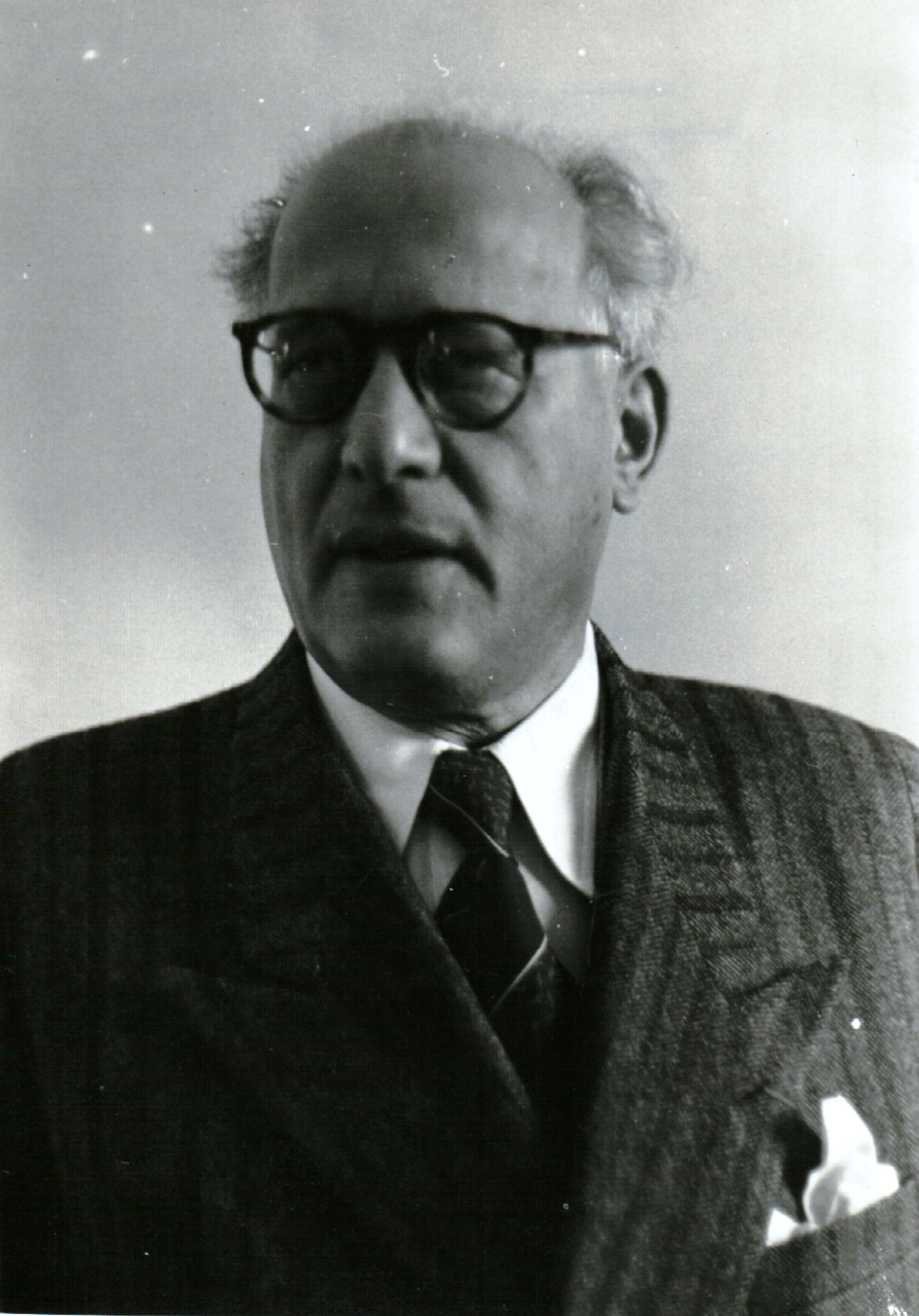
- Grzegorz Fitelberg in 1930s
- Born: 18 October 1879; Dvinsk, Vitebsk Governorate, Russian Empire
- Died: 10 June 1953 (aged 73); Stalinogród, Polish People's Republic
- Occupation: Conductor
- Spouse: Halina Szmolcówna
- Children: Jerzy Fitelberg

Grzegorz Fitelberg (18 October 1879 – 10 June 1953) was a Polish conductor, violinist and composer. He was a member of the Young Poland group, together with artists such as Karol Szymanowski, Ludomir Różycki and Mieczysław Karłowicz.

== Life and career ==
Fitelberg was born into a Jewish family (father Hozjasz Fitelberg, mother Matylda Pintzof, sister Leja Wacholder, 1881–1941, were all murdered in the Holocaust), in Dvinsk, Russian Empire (now Daugavpils, Latvia). Between 1906 and 1907, he performed several times at the Berlin Philharmonic. In 1908 he conducted in the Warsaw Opera, and between 1912 and 1913 in the Vienna State Opera. During the first war he collaborated with Ballets Russes; he conducted the first performance of Igor Stravinsky's Mavra at the Opéra Garnier in Paris. From 1921 to 1934 he was the chief conductor of the Warsaw Philharmonic Orchestra, where he extensively promoted new music. In 1935 he organized the Polish National Radio Symphony Orchestra.

In 1940 Fitelberg and his fiance, Zofia Helene Reicher, received visas from Aristides de Sousa Mendes, to cross into Portugal. This enabled the couple to escape to Brazil. Between 1940 and 1941, he conducted at the Teatro Colón in Buenos Aires. Throughout his career, he performed in various locations worldwide including Paris, Monte Carlo, Brussels, Vienna, Dresden, Leipzig, Moscow, Bristol, London, The Hague, Buenos Aires, New York, Montreal and Toronto. He spent the rest of World War II in exile in the United States.

He returned to Europe in 1946. In 1947, he succeeded Witold Rowicki in leading the Polish National Radio Symphony Orchestra, based in Katowice in the Silesian region. He also performed with his orchestra in Warsaw, Wrocław, Kraków and in Czechoslovakia (1948), Romania and Hungary (1950). He remained director of the orchestra until his death. in the 1950–1951 academic year he was a professor at the State Higher School of Music in Katowice.

He died in Stalinogród, Poland in June 1953. His body was buried in the Avenue of the Meritorious at the Powązki Military Cemetery.

== Personal life ==
His son was the Polish-American composer Jerzy Fitelberg, who predeceased him. His second wife, Halina Schmolz, was a ballet dancer who died in 1939, from wounds suffered during the bombing of the Poniatowski Bridge. Their home, Willa Fitelberga, has been restored.

== Legacy ==
One of Fitelberg's students, Karol Stryja, founded the Grzegorz Fitelberg International Competition for Conductors in 1979. The competition is one of the most important music competitions in Poland, and it takes place in the Silesian Philharmonic.

== Music (selection) ==
=== Orchestral works ===
- Violin Concerto in D minor, Op. 13 (1902–1903)
- Symphony No. 1 in E minor, Op. 16 (1904)
- Song of the Falcon (Pieśń o sokole), Symphonic Poem, Op. 18, after Maxim Gorky (1905)
- Overture No. 1, Op. 14 (1905)
- Overture No. 2, Op. 17 (1906)
- Symphony No. 2 in A major, Op. 20 (1907)
- Protesilaus and Laodamia, Symphonic Poem, Op. 24 (1908)
- Polish Rhapsody, Op. 25 (1913),
- Rhapsody No. 2 (1914)
- From the Depths of the Sea (W głębi morza), Symphonic Poem, Op. 26 (1914).

=== Chamber music ===
- Sonata for violin and piano in A minor, Op. 2 (1894, the work received the I.J.Paderewski Prize in 1898)
- Romances sans paroles, 2 pieces Op. 11 for violin and piano: in D major (1892) and A major (1900)
- Piano trio in F minor, Op. 10 (1901)
- Sonata No. 2 for violin and piano in F major, Op. 12 (1901)

== Awards ==
- Order of the Banner of Labour, 1st Class (1950)
- Commander's Cross with Star of the Order of Polonia Restituta (14 November 1947)
- Commander's Cross of the Order of Polonia Restituta (1947)
- Officer's Cross of the Order of Polonia Restituta (Poland, 1927)
- Gold Cross of Merit (Poland, 1932)
- Commander of the Order of the Crown of Romania (Romania)
- Commander of the Order of the Star of Romania (Romania)
- Commander of the Order of the Crown of Italy (Italy)
- Commander of the Order of St. Sava (Yugoslavia)
- Officer's Cross of Legion of Honour (France)
- Commander's Cross of the Order of the Phoenix (Greece, 1938)

== See also ==
- Antoni Wit
- Music of Poland

Cultural offices
Preceded by Henryk Melcer-Szczawiński	Music directors, Warsaw Philharmonic Orchestra; 1909–1911	Succeeded by Zdzisław Birnbaum
Preceded by Witold Rowicki	Music Director, Polish National Radio Symphony Orchestra; 1947–1953	Succeeded by Jan Krenz
