= Szczecin Philharmonic =

Concert hall in Szczecin, Poland

Coordinates: 53.4377°N 14.5418°E

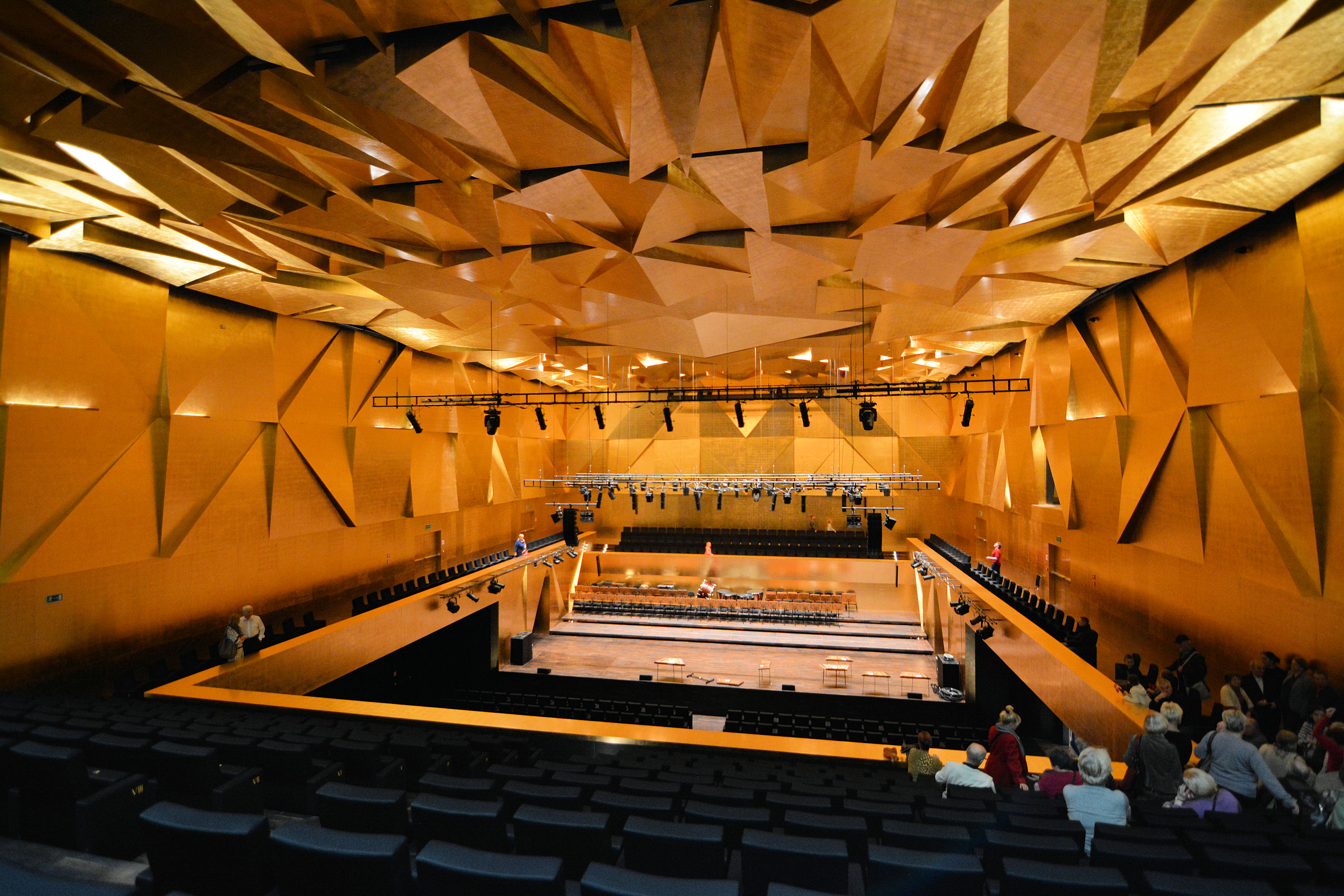
- The main hall of Szczecin Philharmonic
- Interactive map of Szczecin Philharmonic
- Location: Szczecin, Poland
- Seating type: Reserved seating
- Type: Concert hall
- Event: Classical

Construction
- Opened: 1948

Website
- Szczecin Philharmonic

Szczecin Philharmonic, officially Mieczysław Karłowicz Philharmonic (Polish: Filharmonia im. Mieczysława Karłowicza), founded in 1948, is a philharmonic of the city of Szczecin, Poland. In 2015, the new building of the philharmonic was awarded the European Union Prize for Contemporary Architecture.

== History ==
The first concert under the direction of Felicjan Lasota took place in October 25, 1948. In 1958 the Philharmonic was named after the renowned Polish classical composer and conductor Mieczysław Karłowicz (1876-1909). Until 2014 the Philharmonic was located in the representative rooms of the Municipal Office, on Armii Krajowej Square. From September 14, 2014 the new seat of the Philharmonic is a building on 48 Małopolska Street, designed by Studio Barozzi Veiga from Barcelona.

The music venue covers an area of 13,000 square meters and contains a main concert hall with 1000 seats for concert-goers as well as a smaller hall with a capacity for 200 spectators and a number of conference rooms. The characteristic ice-like shape of the philharmonic and its translucent ribbed-glass façade, which gives the building a white glow at night, has become a new icon of the city and has received numerous architectural awards such as First Prize in the prestigious Eurobuild Awards 2014 contest in the category of Architectural Design of the Year. In 2014, a prominent Polish composer Krzysztof Penderecki specially composed a fanfare for the official opening ceremony of the new building and it was performed by the Szczecin Philharmonic Orchestra.

== Directors ==
- Przemysław Neumann (2024 - till now)
- Dorota Serwa (2012–2023)
- Andrzej Oryl (2006–2012)
- Jadwiga Igiel-Sak (1994–2006)
- Jarosław Lipke (1990–1994)
- Stefan Marczyk (1971–1990)
- Józef Wiłkomirski (1955–1971)
- Janusz Cegiełła (1953–1955)

== Gallery ==
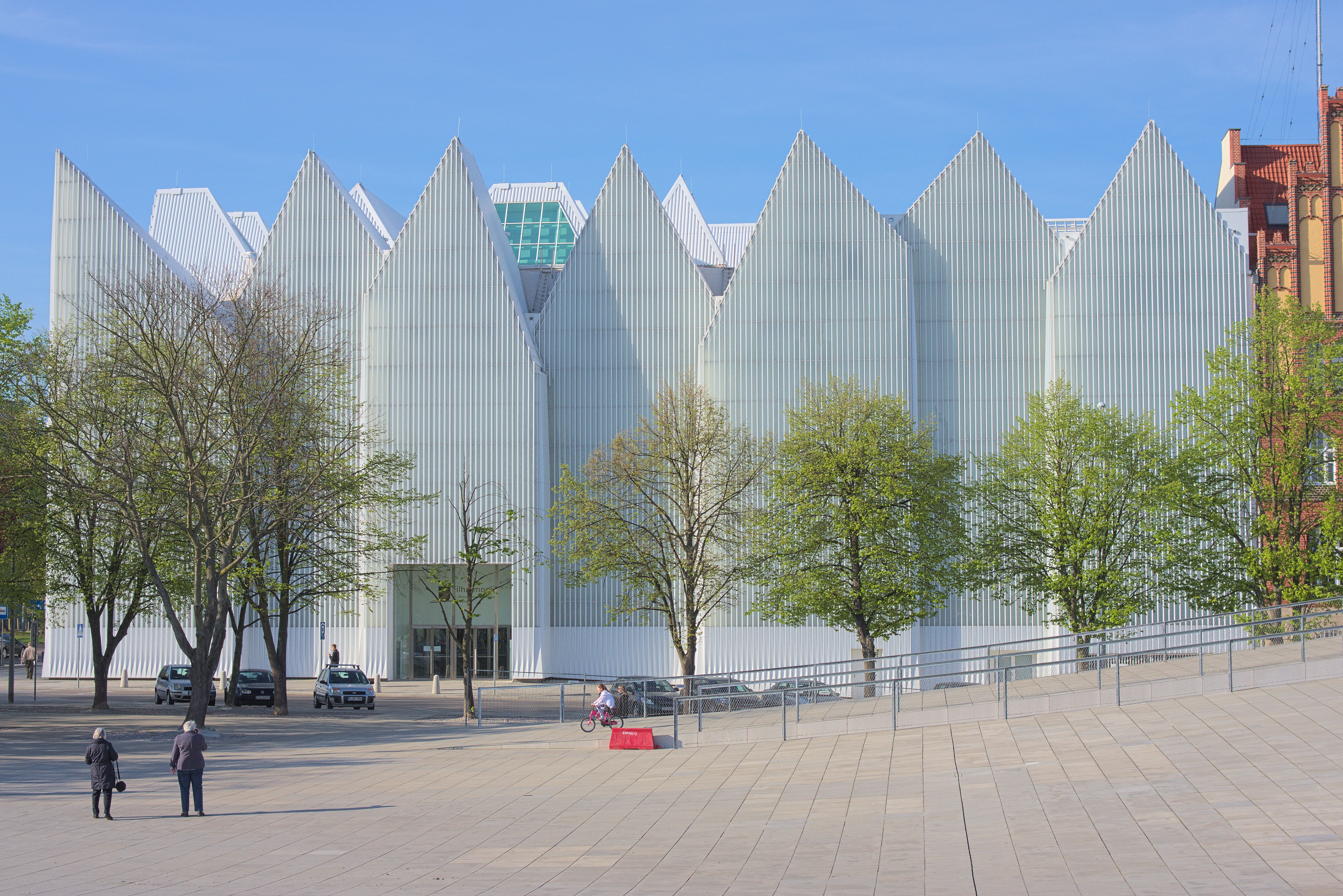
Szczecin Philharmonic Hall, view from plac Solidarności

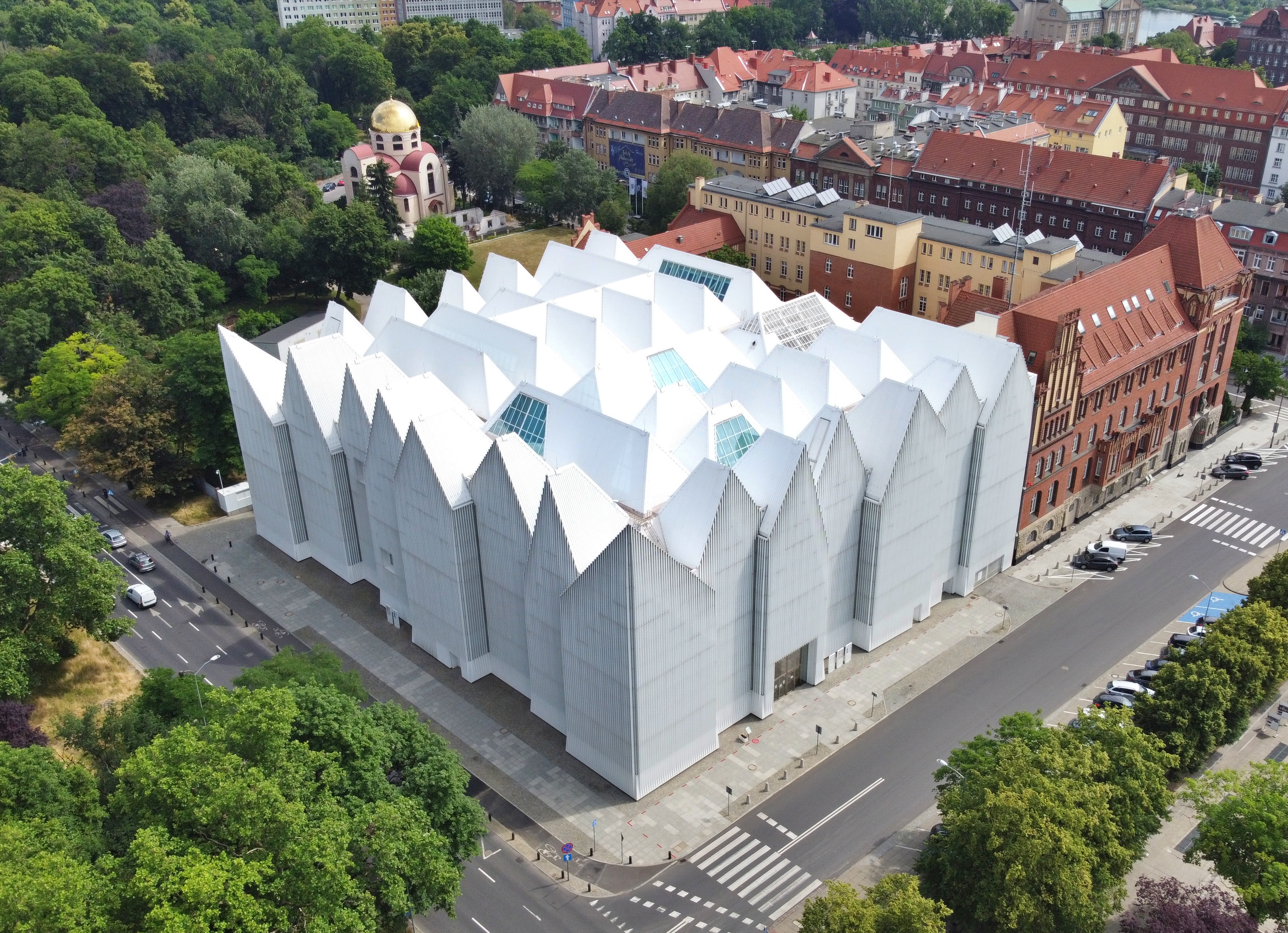
Szczecin Philharmonic Hall, view from plac Solidarności

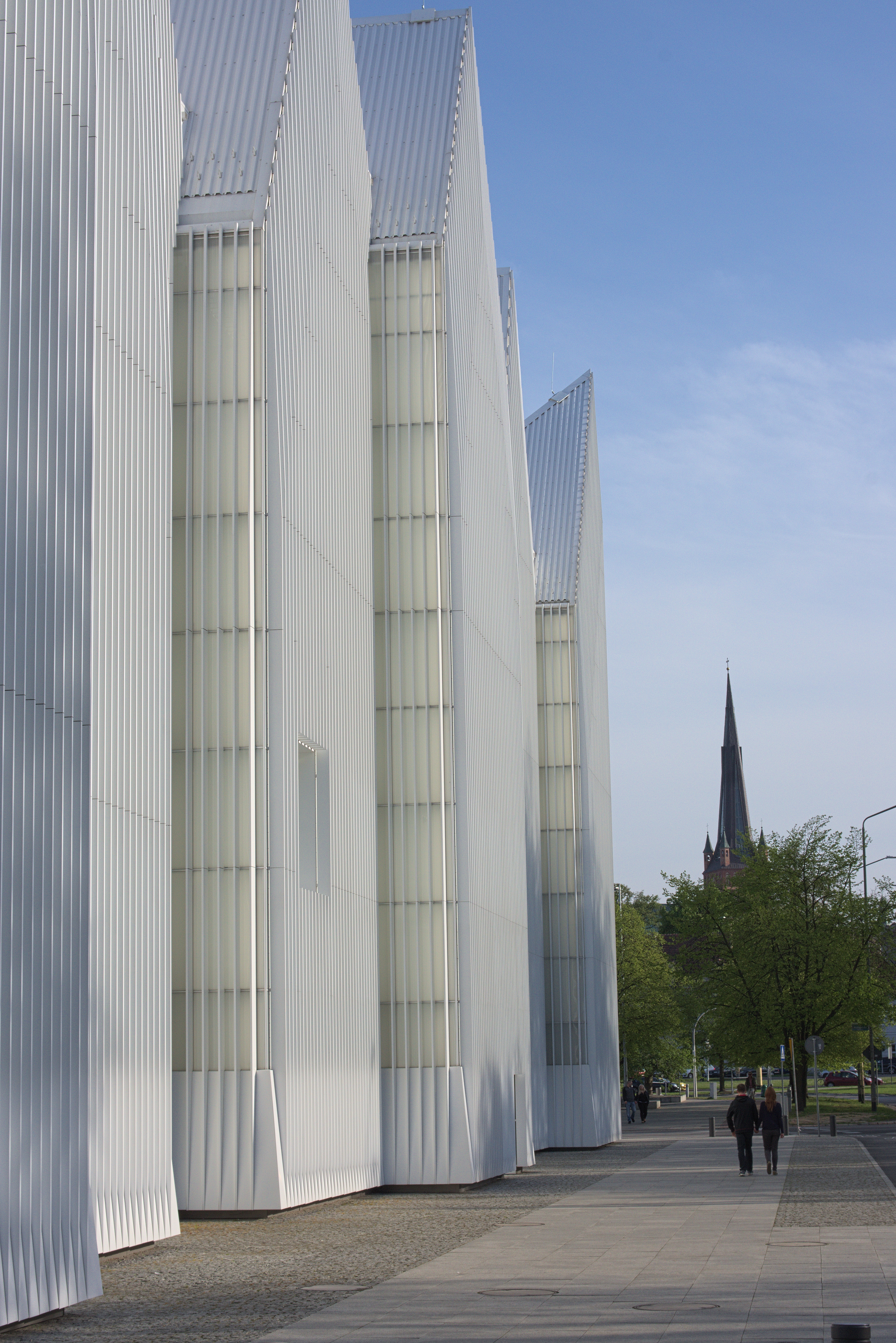
The new building, 48 Małopolska Street, side view from Hołd Pruski Square

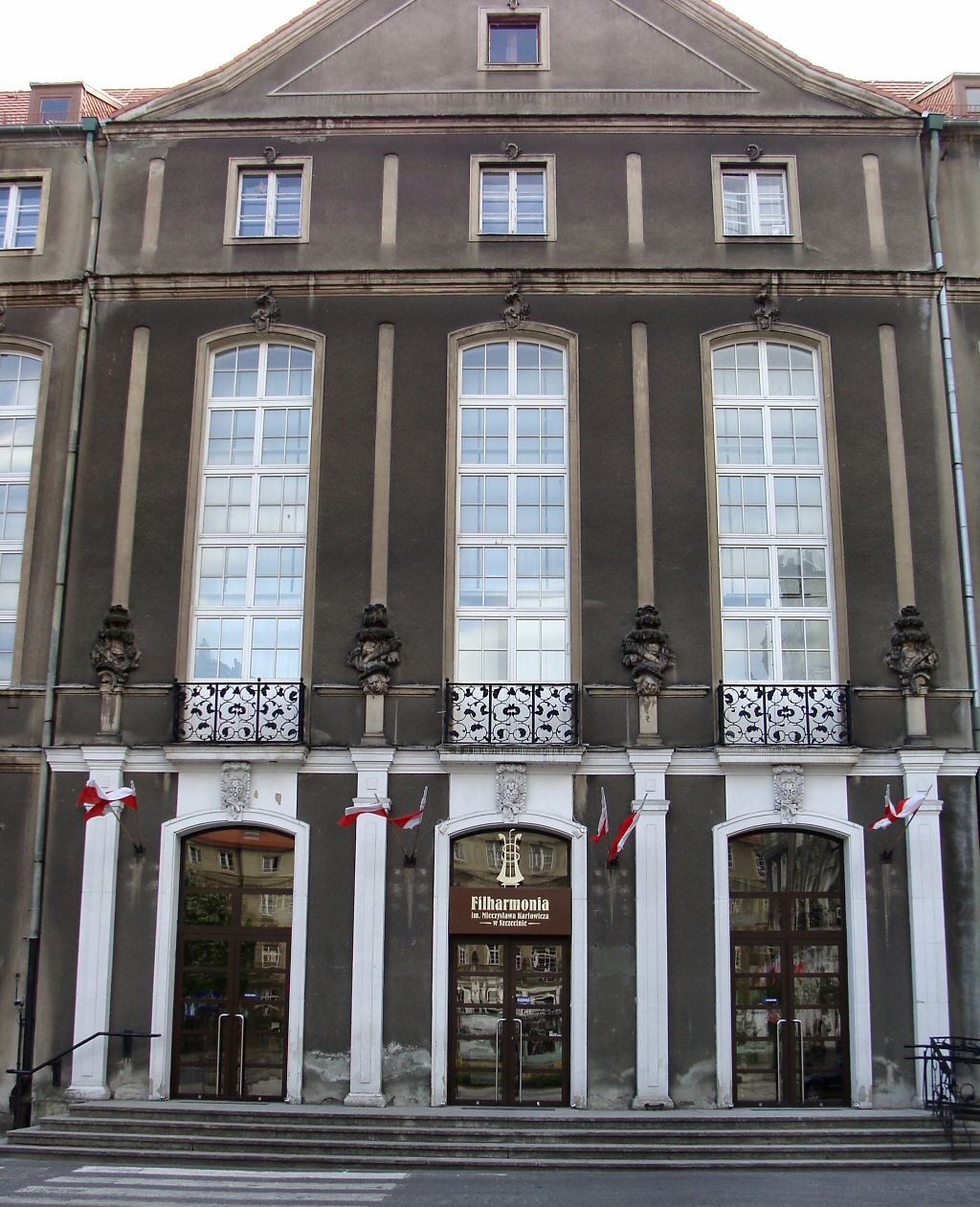
The entrance to the old building of Szczecin Philharmonic, Armii Krajowej Square

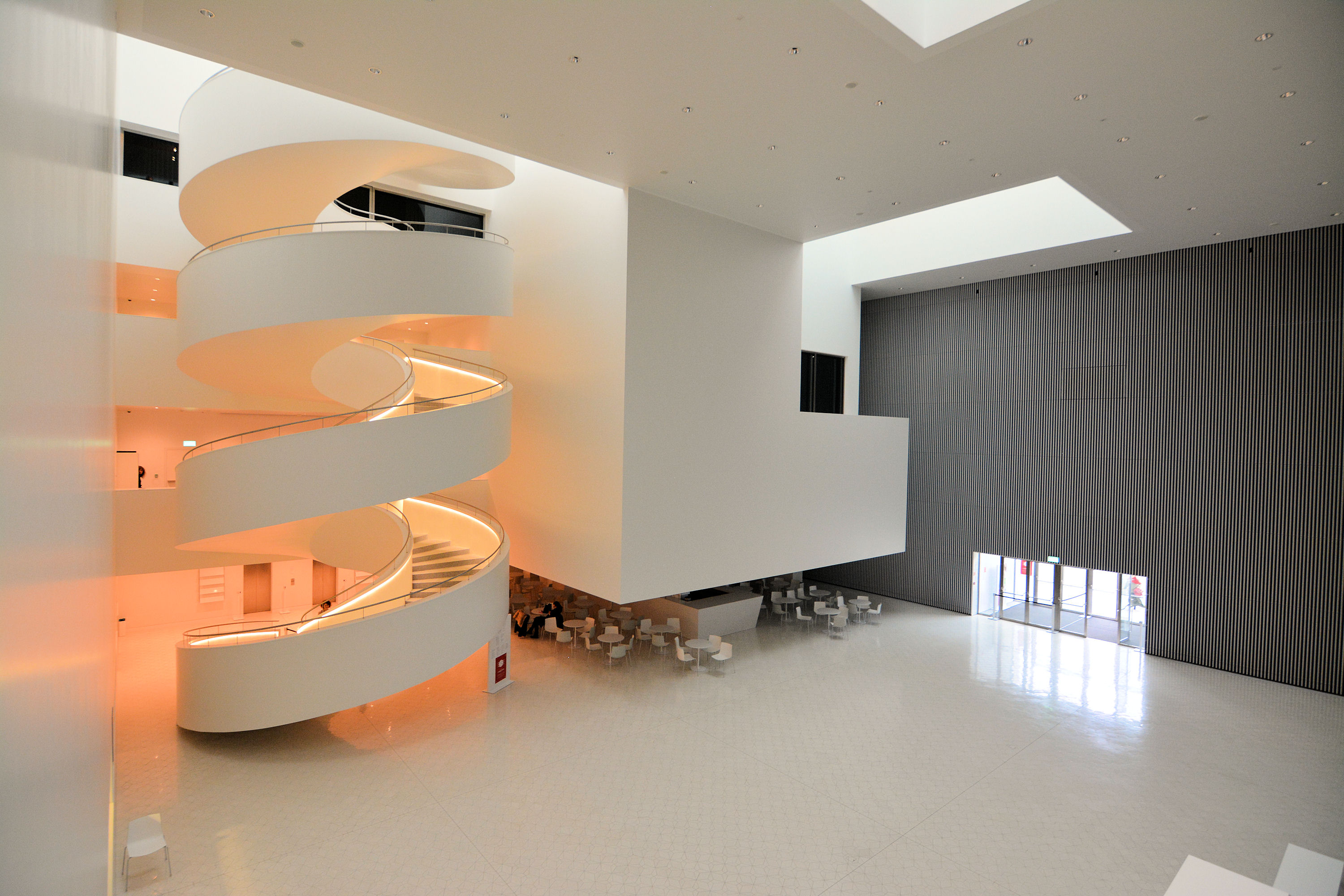
The interior of the new building

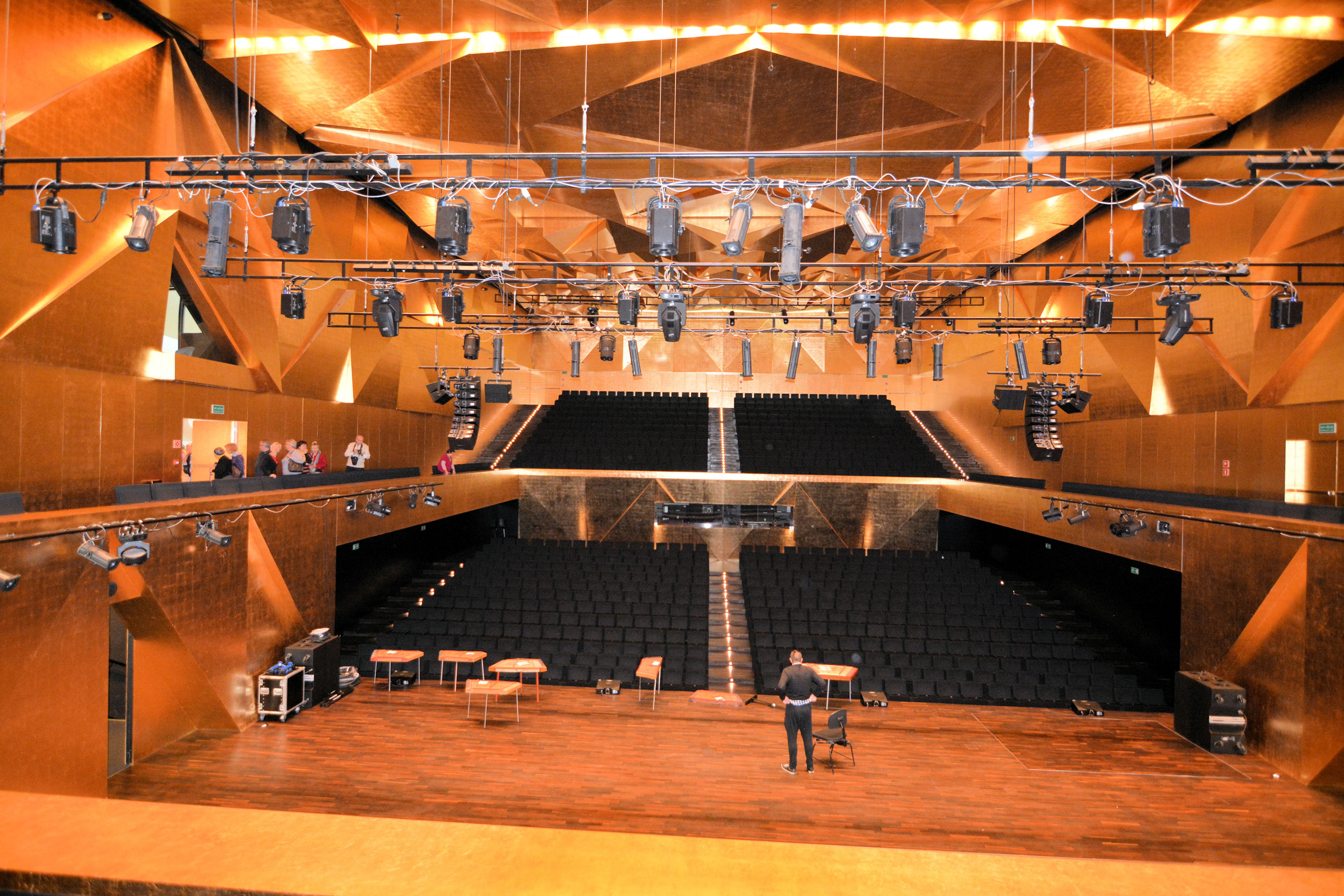
The main hall of Szczecin Philharmonic

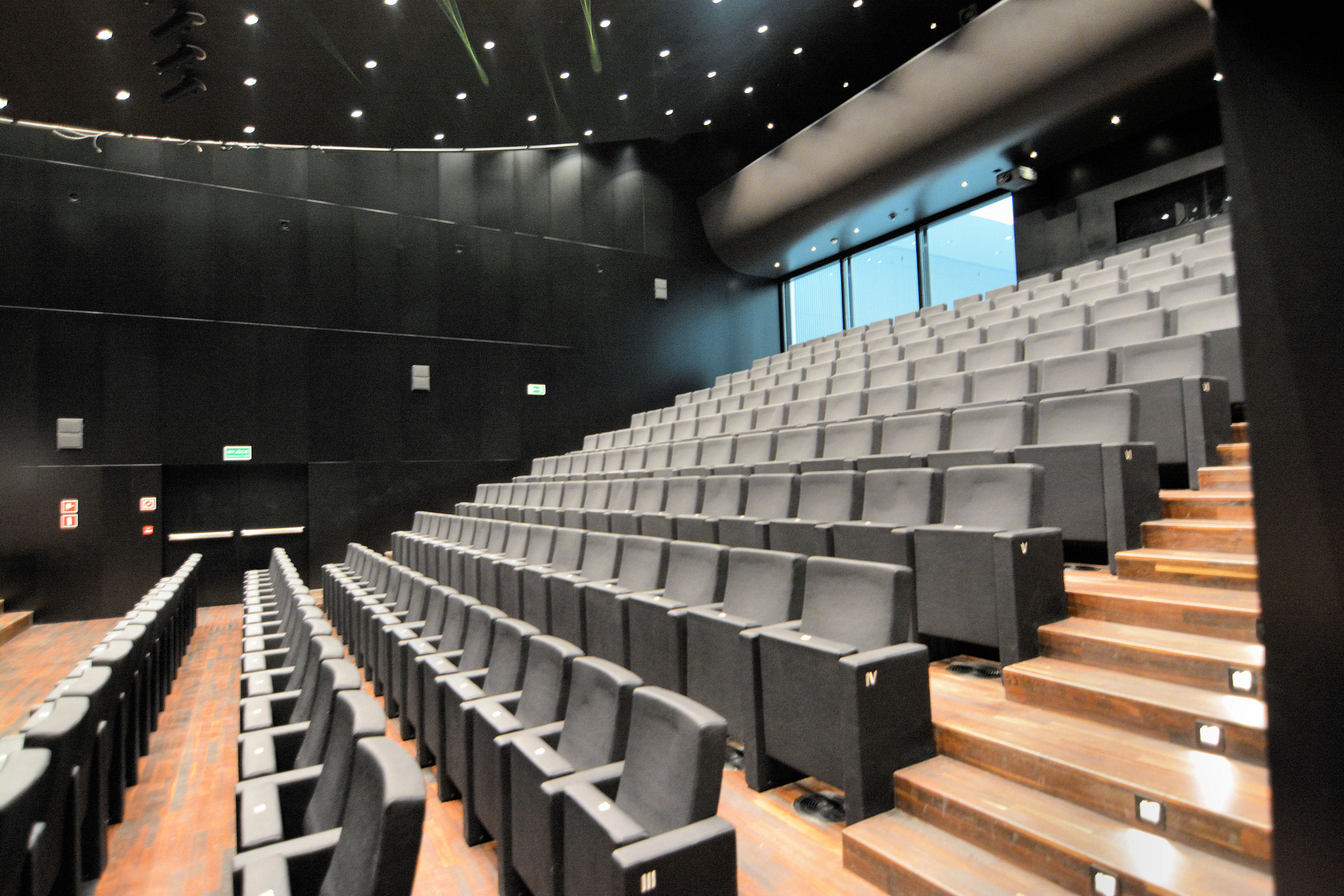
The interior of Szczecin Philharmonic Hall

== See also ==
- List of concert halls in Poland
