= Silesian Philharmonic =

Polish orchestra and concert hall

Coordinates: 50°16′N 19°01′E

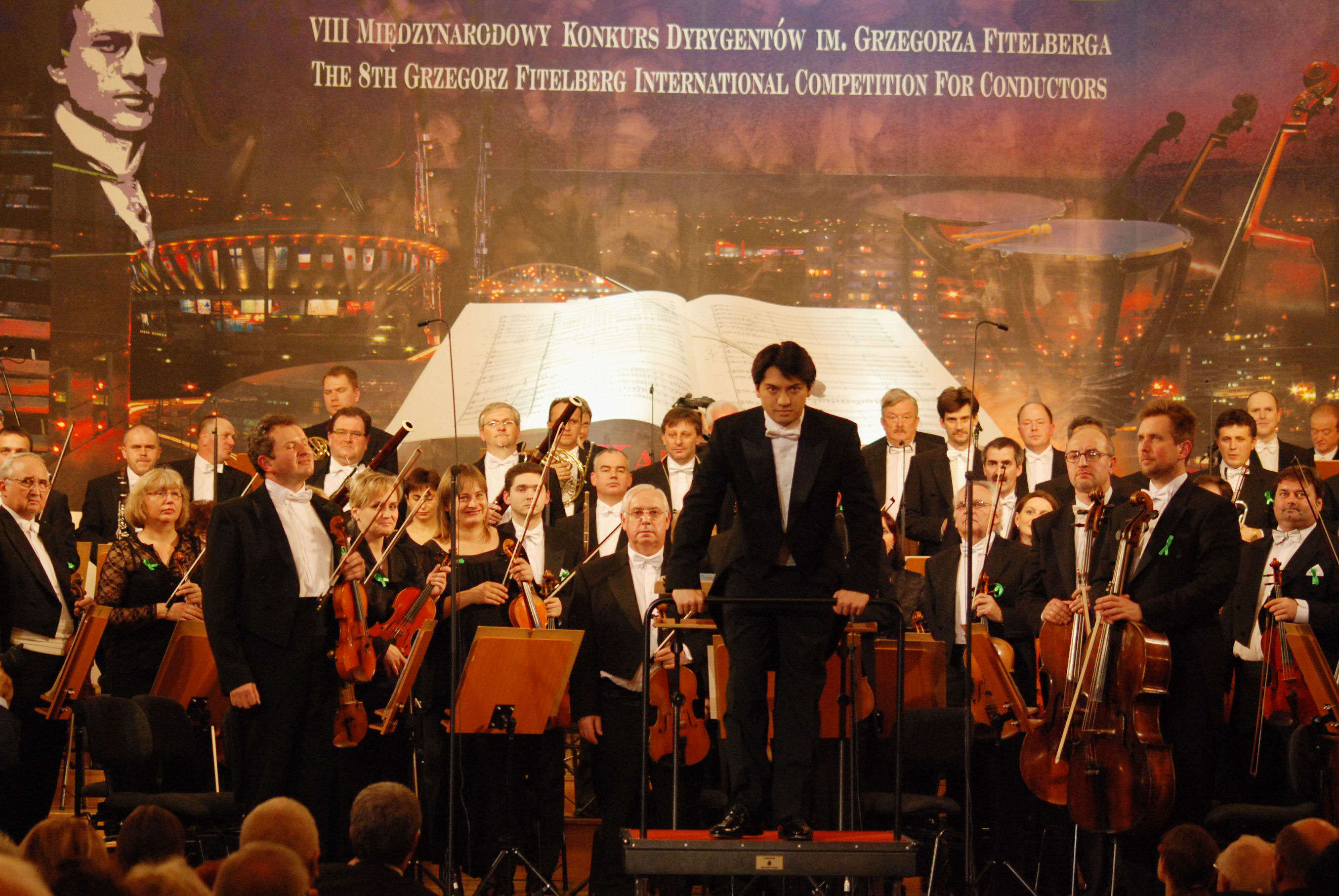
Silesian Philharmonic in Katowice during The VIII Grzegorz Fitelberg International Competition for Conductors

The Filharmonia Śląska w Katowicach (English: Silesian Philharmonic in Katowice) is a music institution in Katowice, Silesia, Poland. The Silesian Philharmonic in Katowice was founded in 1945. The first concert of the orchestra took place on 26 of May 1945. A mixed choir was added in 1973.

The Silesian Philharmonic has a well-established position in the cultural life of the Metropolis GZM. Over the decades, the most renowned musicians performed with it, for example Witold Małcużyński, Igor Oistrakh, Sviatoslav Richter, Adam Taubitz.

== Directors ==
- Jan Niwinski (1945–1947)
- Witold Krzemienski (1947–1949)
- Stanisław Skrowaczewski (1949–1953)
- Karol Stryja (1953–1990)
- Jerzy Swoboda (1990–1998)
- Music director Mirosław Jacek Błaszczyk (1998–)
- General director Grażyna Szymborska (2001–)
