= Mieczysław Karłowicz =

Polish composer and conductor

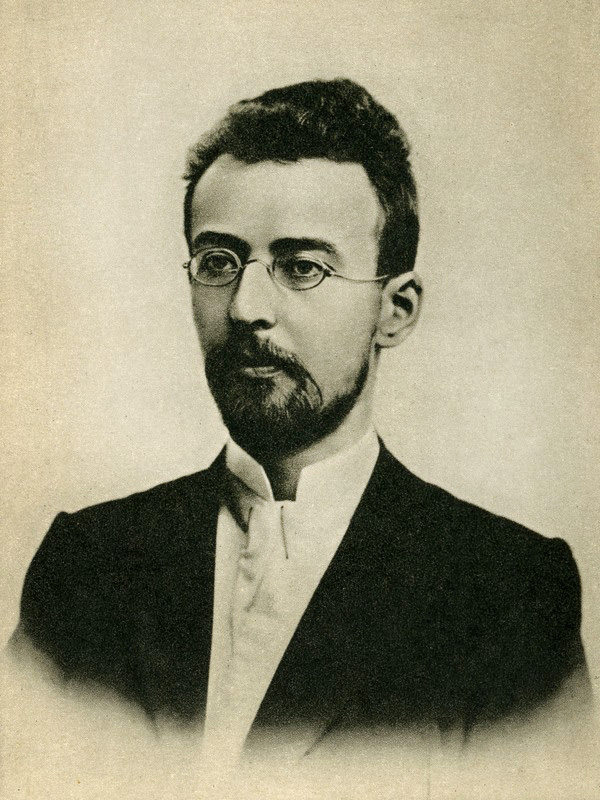
- Born: 11 December 1876; Vishnyeva, Vilna Governorate, Russian Empire
- Died: 8 February 1909 (aged 32); Tatra Mountains, Austrian Poland

Mieczysław Karłowicz ([miɛt͡ʂɨswaf ˈkarwɔvit͡ʂ], 11 December 1876 – 8 February 1909) was a Polish composer and conductor.

== Life ==
Mieczysław Karłowicz was born in Vishneva, in the Vilna Governorate of the Russian Empire (now in Belarus) into a noble family belonging to Clan Ostoja. His father Jan was a Polish linguist, lexicographer, and musician. As a child, Karłowicz studied violin, for which he later composed his only concerto.

Karłowicz studied in Warsaw with Zygmunt Noskowski, Stanisław Barcewicz, Piotr Maszyński, and Gustaw Roguski. He later studied in Berlin with Heinrich Urban, to whom he dedicated his Serenade for Strings, which he composed and performed while Urban's student. From 1906 to 1907 he studied conducting with Arthur Nikisch.

== Career ==
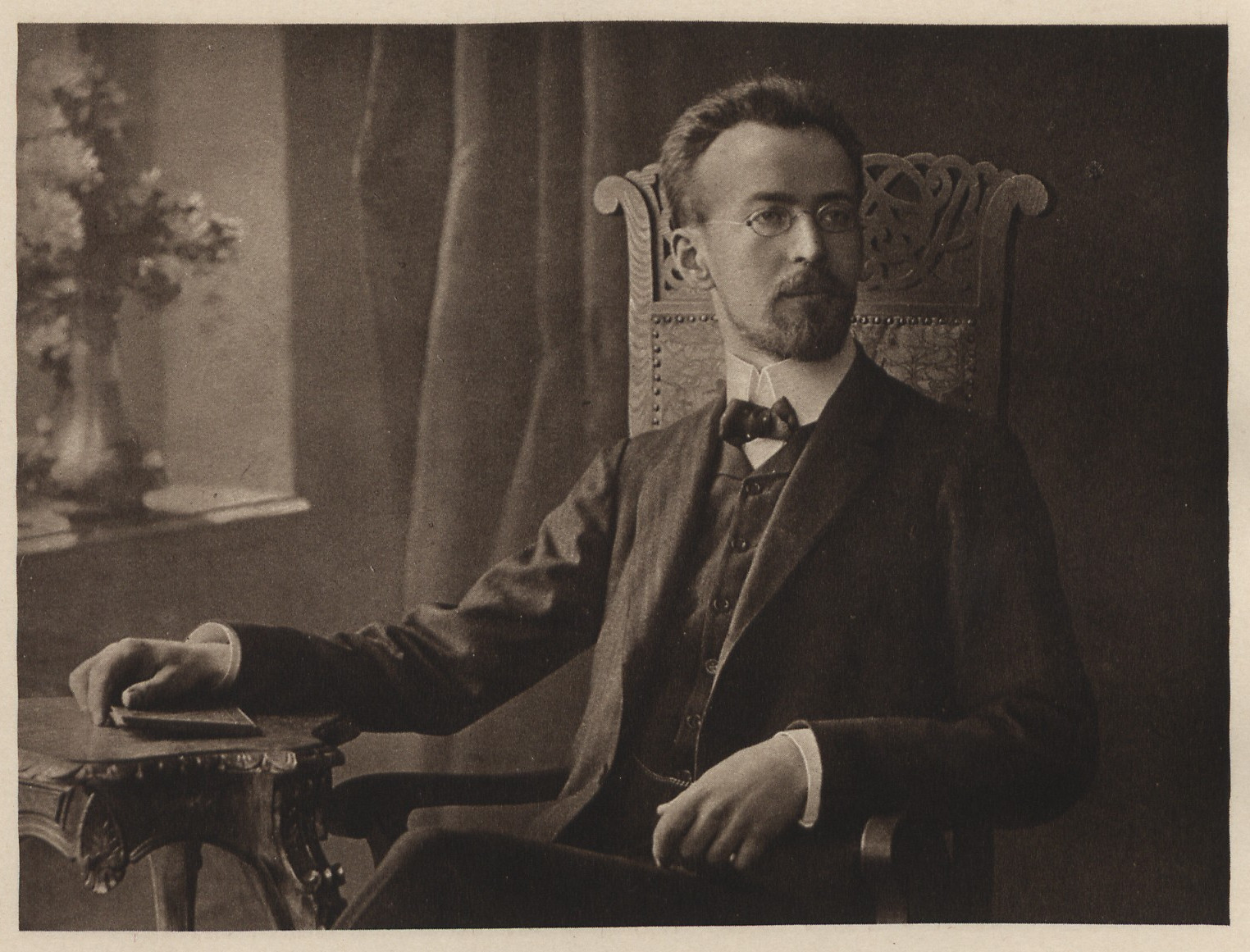
Karłowicz in 1910

Karłowicz's music is of a late Romantic character. He was a great admirer of Pyotr Ilyich Tchaikovsky whose Symphony No. 6 he praised. Tchaikovsky's influence can be heard in Karłowicz's earlier works, most notably the E minor symphony and the Violin Concerto. Like most of the late Romantics he also fell under the considerable influence of Richard Wagner, especially with Tristan und Isolde. Nevertheless, he managed to develop an original musical language expressed in harmony and orchestration, the latter of which he mastered like few other composers and wrote some of the most colourful orchestral music ever found.

Among his works are a Symphony in E minor (Rebirth, Op. 7), a Violin Concerto in A major (Op. 8), incidental music to a play The White Dove, and six tone poems, which include The Returning Waves, Eternal Songs, Lithuanian Rhapsody, Stanisław i Anna Oświecimowie, Smutna opowieść, and Epizod na maskaradzie. The Violin Concerto was written for and dedicated to his former teacher Stanisław Barcewicz, who premiered the work under Karłowicz's baton in Berlin on 21 March 1903 with the Berlin Philharmonic.

He also wrote a number of songs for voice and piano, setting words by Kazimierz Przerwa-Tetmajer, Adam Asnyk, and others. Much of the rest of his small output was lost during World War II. Karłowicz spent much of his later life in Zakopane in southern Poland, often enjoying one of his favorite hobbies, photography, in the nearby mountain scenery. Karłowicz died at the age of 32 in an avalanche while skiing on an excursion in the Tatra Mountains in 1909. He was buried at Warsaw's Powązki Cemetery.

The Szczecin Philharmonic bears the name of Mieczysław Karłowicz as a recognition of the composer's musical legacy.

== Recent bibliography ==
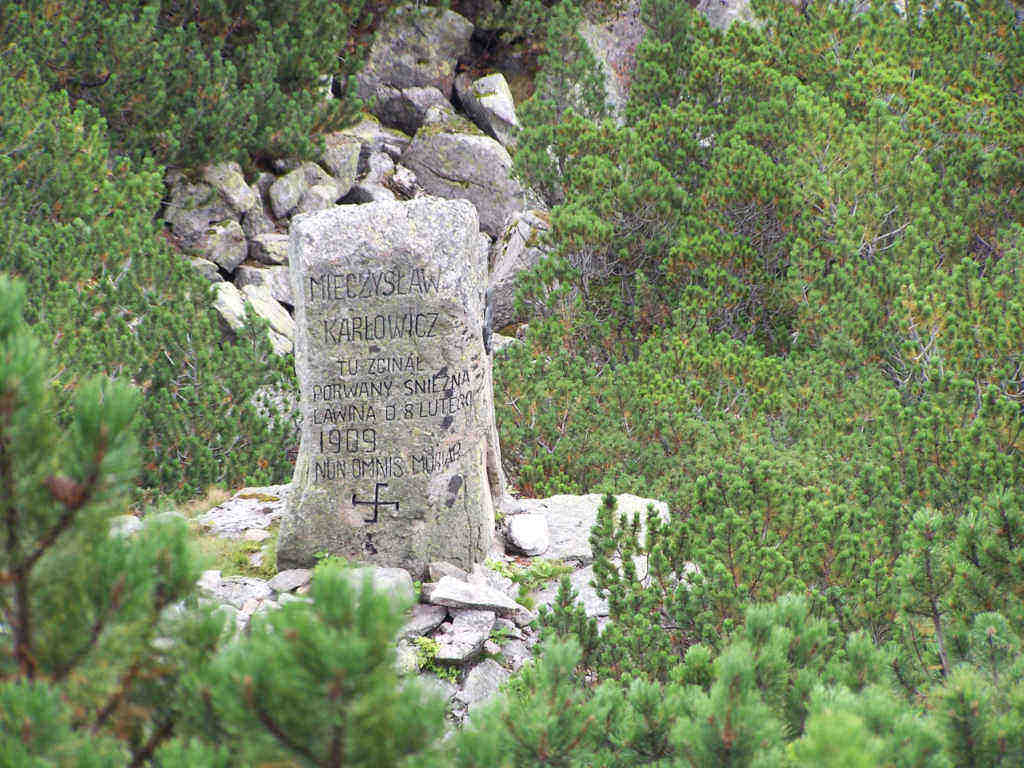
Karłowicz's Stone in the Tatras, marking where his body was found. The swastika, inspired by Podhale folk art, has no connection with Nazism.

- Luca Lévi Sala. Mieczysław Karłowicz, in Oxford Bibliographies Online, 2018 (http://www.oxfordbibliographies.com/view/document/obo-9780199757824/obo-9780199757824-0232.xml
- Luca Lévi Sala, European Fin-de-siècle and Polish Modernism. The Music of Mieczysław Karłowicz, Bologne, Ut Orpheus Edizioni, 2010.
- Christophe Jeżewski, Le Retour d'un génie. Pour le centenaire de Mieczysław Karłowicz, in "Europe", n°961, Paris, May 2009.
- Janusz Mechanisz: Mieczysław Karłowicz, Polihymnia, 2009, ISBN 978-83-7270-610-2
- Henryk Anders, Mieczysław Karłowicz. Życie i dokonania, Poznań, ABOS, 1998.
- Wightman, Alistair. Karłowicz, Young Poland and the Musical Fin-de-siècle, Aldershot, Ashgate, 1996; Polish translation by Ewa Gabryś, Karłowicz. Młoda Polska i muzyczny fin de siècle, Kraków, PWM, 1996 (Monografie Popularne).
- Leszek Polony, Poetyka muzyczna Mieczysława Karłowicza, Cracow, PWM, 1986.
- Paul-Gilbert Langevin, Musiciens d'Europe, "La Revue Musicale", Editions Richard Masse, Paris, 1986.
- Elżbieta Dziębowska, éd. Z życia i twórczości Mieczysława Karłowicza, Cracow, PWM, 1970.

== Works ==
Solo Voice

6 Songs, Op.1

- No. 1. Zamuconej (Saddened)
- No. 2. Skąd pierwsze gwiazdy (Whence the First Stars)
- No. 3. Na śniegu (In the Snow)
- No. 4. Zawód (Disillusion)
- No. 5. Pamiętam ciche, jasne, złote dnie (I Remember Quiet, Clear Golden Days)
- No. 6. Smutną jest dusza moja (My Soul is Sad)

Drugi spiewnik, Op. 3

- No. 1. Mów do mnie jeszcze (Speak to me Still)
- No. 2. Z erotyków (From Erotica)
- No. 3. Idzie na pola (It Goes Over the Fields)
- No. 4. Na spokojnym, ciemnym morzu (On the Calm Dark Sea)
- No. 5. Śpi w blaskach nocy (Asleep in the Splendors of the Night)
- No. 6. Przed nocą wieczną (Before the Eternal Night)
- No. 7. Nie płacz nade mną (Weep not Over Me)
- No. 8. W wiecznorną ciszę (In the Calm of the Evening)
- No. 9. Po szerokim morzu (Over the Wide Sea)
- No. 10. Zaczarowana królewna (The Enchanted Princess)

Najpiękniejsze piosnki, Op. 4 (The Most Beautiful Songs)

Z nowa wiosna

O nie wierz temu, co powiedza ludzie

Czasem, gdy długo

Rdzawe liście

Pod jaworem słowa

Pod naszymi okny

Piano (solo)

- Preludium i fuga podwójna, Op. 5 (Prelude and Double Fugue)

Orchestral

- Serenade for Strings, Op. 2
- Incidental music from Bianca da Molena, Op. 6 (The White Dove)
- Symfonia "Odrodzenie", Op. 7 (Symphony "Rebirth")
- Concerto for Violin, Op. 8
- Powracające fale, Op. 9 (Returning Waves)
- Odwieczne pieśni, Op. 10 (Eternal Songs)
- Rapsodia litewska, Op. 11 (Lithuanian Rhapsody)
- Stanisław i Anna Oświecimowie, Op. 12 (Stanislaw and Anna of Oświecim)
- Smutna opowieść, Op. 13 (A Sorrowful Tale)
- Epizod na maskaradzie, Op. 14 (Episode at a Masquerade) [posthumously completed by Grzegorz Fitelberg]

== Discography ==
- (rec. 1981 and 1983) Complete symphonic poems (Silesian Philharmonic, Jerzy Salwarowski) – (LP, 1984) Wifon 063–65; (CD, 1989) Le Chant du Monde LDC 278 966–967; (CD, 1999, 2008) DUX 132/133
- (live rec. 1996) Complete symphonic poems (Warsaw Symphony Orchestra, Jacek Kaspszyk) – (1997) Pro Musica Camerata PMC 013/14
- Complete symphonic poems (New Zealand Symphony Orchestra, Antoni Wit) - (CD) Naxos 8.570295 and 8.570452
- Complete symphonic poems (BBC Philharmonic, Jan Pascal Tortelier) - (CD) Chandos Records CHAN 9986 and CHAN 10298
- Violin Concerto and Serenade, Ilya Kaler, Warsaw Philharmonic Orchestra, Antoni Wit - (CD) Naxos8.572274
- Violin Concerto, Nigel Kennedy, Polish Chamber Orchestra, Jacek Kaspszyk - (cd) EMI Records
- Violin Concerto and Serenade for Strings (Kaja Danczowska, Polish Radio and TV Orchestra of Krakow, Antoni Wit) - (CD) Le Chant du Monde CDM LDC 278 1088
- Symphony "Rebirth", Serenade for Strings, and Prologue from Music for The White Dove - BBC Philharmonic, Gianandrea Noseda - (CD) Chandos Records CHAN 10171
- Symphony "Rebirth" - Warsaw Philharmonic Orchestra, Jerzy Salwarowski - (CD) DUX Records, DUX 0656
- Młodzieńcze utwory instrumentalne [Early instrumental compositions] (2CDs) Katowice: Państwowa Szkoła Muzyczna im. M. Karłowicza w Katowicach, 2006 (PSM CD001, PSM CD002)
- Violin Concerto in A major Op.8 - Tasmin Little (violin), BBC Scottish Symphony Orchestra / Martyn Brabbins conductor (Hyperion CDA67389, recorded September 2003, released April 2004)
- Violin Concerto in A major Op.8 - Piotr Plawner (violin), Zielona Gora Philharmonic Orchestra / Czeslaw Grabovski conductor (CD) DUX Records, DUX0540, recorded December 2005, released 2006

== See also ==
- List of Polish people
- Clan Ostoja
- Ostoja coat of arms
- Young Poland
