= Kraków Philharmonic Orchestra =

Polish orchestra

- Founded: 1909
- Concert hall: Kraków Philharmonic Hall
- Principal conductor: Michał Dworzyński
- Website: filharmonia.krakow.pl

The Kraków Philharmonic Orchestra or the Symphony Orchestra of the Karol Szymanowski Philharmonic Society (Polish: Orkiestra Symfoniczna Filharmonii im. Karola Szymanowskiego) is a professional symphony orchestra based in Kraków, Poland. The national status of the orchestra is reflected in its program of events, including weekly symphonic concerts in the Wawel Royal Castle, or at the Jagiellonian University's Collegium Novum, and prominent Kraków churches. The company is more active professionally than any other philharmonic orchestra in the country.

The Symphony Orchestra, presently residing in the Kraków Philharmonic Hall, came into being in 1945. It was the first professional symphony orchestra in postwar Poland, formed at the local concert hall during the Soviet offensive. The first postwar director as well as the conductor of the historic first performance held on February 3, 1945 (three months before the end of World War II in Europe), was Zygmunt Latoszewski, survivor of the Warsaw Uprising.

== Historical background ==
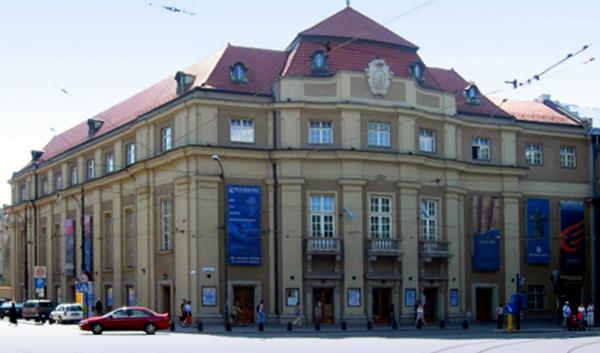
Kraków Philharmonic Hall, home of the Kraków Philharmonic Orchestra

Although the attempts to create the first modern-type symphony orchestra in the city go back to the 18th century under Austrian rule, the professional team was assembled in Kraków only during the imminent collapse of Austria-Hungary (1909), on the initiative of patriotic composer and music director Feliks Nowowiejski (born 1877).

Soon after the return of Poland's sovereignty at the end of World War One, the company was reinstated, with an inaugural concert held on May 18, 1919, for the centennial anniversary of Stanisław Moniuszko's birthday, featuring 80 musicians. In 1931 a brand new concert hall (pictured) was built at Zwierzyniecka Street. The resident orchestra was active there until the Nazi-Soviet invasion of Poland, with the last performance held on May 21, 1939, under the direction of Bronisław Wolfstahl.

== Artistic profile ==
Mozart - Piano Concerto No. 23
Music sample from stage performance by Kraków Philharmonic Orchestra

As of 2013 the Orchestra has been around for almost sixty years, with a new generation of performers and soloists. It consists of almost one hundred musicians in sixteen sections with five concert-masters whose profiles can be obtained from its official website. In 1962 it was named after composer Karol Szymanowski (1882–1937) whose abundant works the orchestra has performed regularly ever since; along with pieces by another great Polish composer living in Kraków, Krzysztof Penderecki. Penderecki served as the artistic director of the orchestra in 1988–1990, and from 1993 held the post of its honorary artistic director. Over the years, the Orchestra has made a host of popular recordings, among them, with music by Dmitri Shostakovich, Ignacy Jan Paderewski, Gaetano Donizetti, Mieczysław Karłowicz, Karol Szymanowski, Max Bruch, Grażyna Bacewicz, Henryk Górecki, Stanisław Moniuszko and others.

The Kraków Philharmonic performed in over 30 foreign countries including in almost all of Europe as well as in Iran, Japan, Canada, South Korea, Lebanon, Turkey and USA. Their concerts were led by the most prominent Polish conductors including Zygmunt Latoszewski, Bohdan Wodiczko, Witold Rowicki, Kazimierz Kord, Jerzy Maksymiuk, Krzysztof Penderecki, Antoni Wit, and from abroad: Hermann Abendroth, Nikolai Anosov, Roger Désormière, Dean Dixon, Antal Doráti, Christopher Hogwood, Konstantin Ivanov, Paweł Klecki, Kirill Kondrashin, Rafael Kubelík, Gilbert Levine, Jean Martinon, Sir John Pritchard, Helmuth Rilling, Jerzy Semkow, Giuseppe Sinopoli, and Carlo Zecchi.

A number of world-renowned soloists also performed with the orchestra. The most prominent include Victoria de los Ángeles, Cathy Berberian, Stanislav Bunin, Zara Dolukhanova, Dorothy Dorow, Sidney Harth, Gary Karr, Nigel Kennedy, Leonid Kogan, Gidon Kremer, Witold Małcużyński, Yehudi Menuhin, Midori Gotō, Shlomo Mintz, Tatiana Nikolayeva, Garrick Ohlsson, David and Igor Oistrakh, Vlado Perlemuter, Maurizio Pollini, Ruggiero Ricci, Mstislav Rostropovich, Artur Rubinstein, Isaac Stern, Henryk Szeryng, Narciso Yepes, Yo-Yo Ma, and Teresa Żylis-Gara.

== Music directors ==
=== Since 1945 ===
- Zygmunt Latoszewski (1945–1949)
- Bohdan Wodiczko (1951–1953)
- Stanisław Skrowaczewski (1954–1956)
- Witold Rowicki (1957–1958)
- Andrzej Markowski (1959–1964)
- Henryk Czyz (1964–1967)
- Jerzy Katlewicz (1968–1981)
- Tadeusz Strugała (1981–1986)
- Gilbert Levine (1987–1993)
- Vladimir Ponkin (1994–1998)
- Tomasz Bugaj (1998–2005)
- Jan Krenz (2005–2008)
- Tadeusz Strugała (2008)
- Pavel Przytotsky (since 2009)
