= Jadwiga Rappé =

Polish operatic contralto (1952–2025)

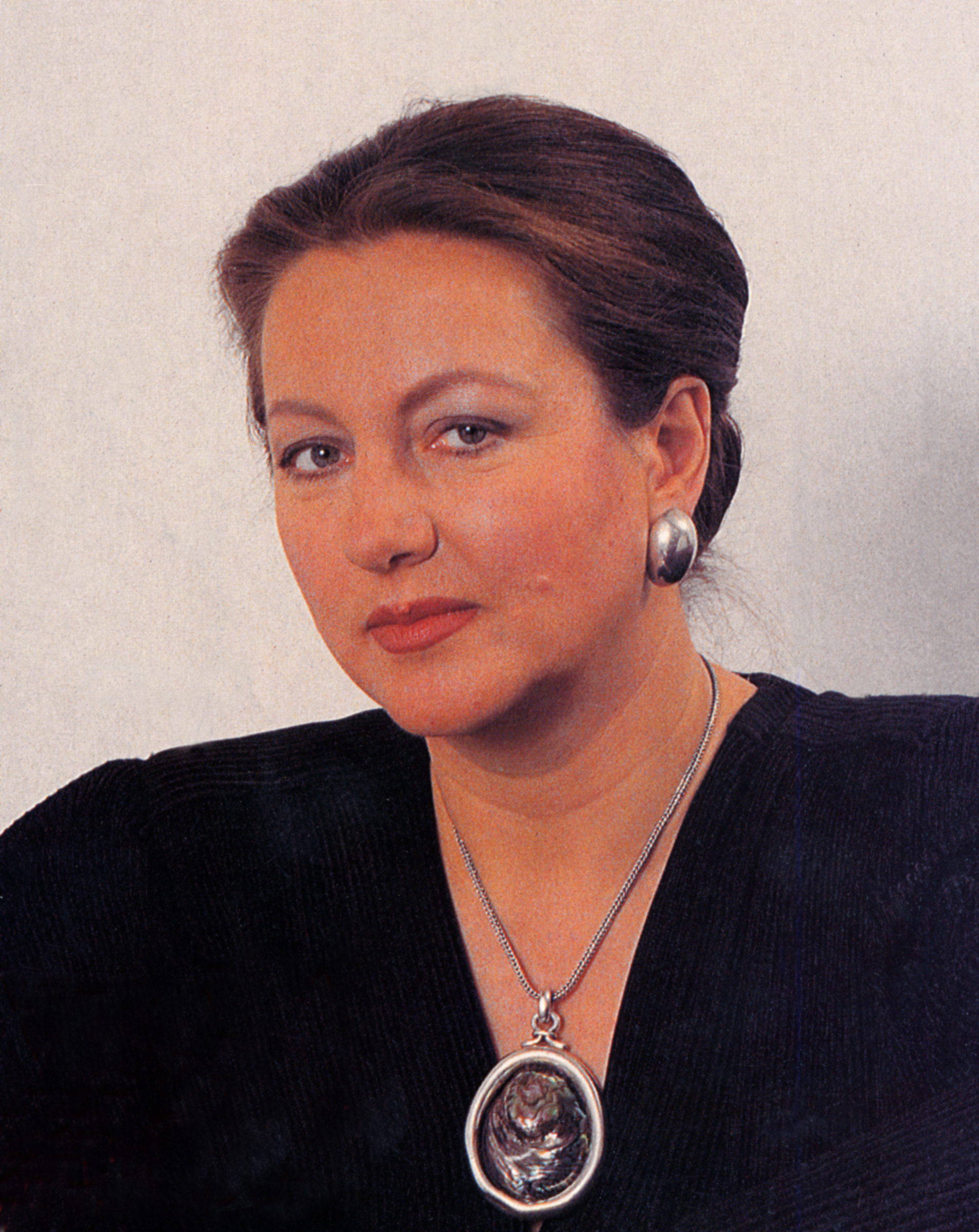
- Rappé in 1993
- Born: 24 February 1952; Toruń, Poland
- Died: 16 May 2025 (aged 73)
- Occupation: Contralto
- Organizations: Grand Theatre, Warsaw; Fryderyk Chopin University of Music

Jadwiga Rappé (24 February 1952 – 16 May 2025) was a Polish contralto who made an international career in concert and opera, performing a wide range of repertoire. She was based at the Grand Theatre, Warsaw, and taught voice at the Fryderyk Chopin University of Music. Her signature role was Erda in Wagner's Der Ring des Nibelungen, a character that she portrayed first at the Deutsche Oper Berlin in 1988 and then in several other European capitals. Many compositions were written for her voice.

== Life and career ==
Rappé was born in Toruń on 24 February 1952. She first studied Slavic philology at the University of Warsaw. During these studies she began voice studies with Zofia Brégy at the Warsaw school of music, studying further at the Wrocław Academy of Music with Jerzy Artysz; she graduated with distinction. In 1980, she was awarded first prize at the International Bach Competition in Leipzig, and the following year a gold medal at the Festival of Young Soloists in Bordeaux.

=== Concert ===
Rappé focused on oratorio, songs and large-scale concerts, performing a wide range of repertoire from Baroque to contemporary music. She began her career as a singer in concerts, first in Poland, then from 1984 also abroad. She premiered works by Krzysztof Penderecki, including the Seven Gates of Jerusalem, conducted by Lorin Maazel in 1997. She performed in the world premiere of Wojciech Kilar's Missa pro pace at the National Philharmonic in Warsaw, conducted by Kazimierz Kord in 2001. In 2008 she sang in the first performance of Ladislav Kubík's Gong. Sinfonietta. for mezzo-soprano, mixed choir and orchestra in Prague. She sang works composed especially for her voice by Juliusz Łuciuk, Piotr Moss and Krzysztof Baculewski, including the premiere on 1 July 2011 of Paweł Mykietyn's Symphony No. 3 at the National Philharmonic in Warsaw.

=== Opera ===
Rappé made her professional opera debut in 1983 at the Grand Theatre, Warsaw, in the first performance at the house of Handel's Amadigi di Gaula. She remained a regular artist at the theatre. She performed leading roles with other opera houses internationally; she appeared at the Badisches Staatstheater Karlsruhe in 1984, at the Ludwigsburg Festival in 1985, in 1988 in Paris and at the Cologne Opera, at the Orange Festival in 1988, at the Teatro Comunale di Bologna in 1989, and in Amsterdam in 1990. She sang the role of Cieca in Ponchielli's La Gioconda for a Dutch broadcaster in 1990, and Gaea in a concert performance of Daphne by R. Strauss at the Grand Théâtre de Genève in 1991. Her stage roles included Juno in Handel's Semele, Orfeo in Gluck's Orfeo ed Euridice, and Ulrica in Verdi's Un ballo in maschera.

In 1988, she appeared as Erda in Wagner's Ring cycle at the Deutsche Oper Berlin. It became her signature role that she performed also at the Royal Opera House the same year, in the Warsaw Ring cycle in 1989/90, at the Oper Frankfurt in 1995, at La Monnaie in Brussels and the Vienna State Opera.

=== Teaching ===
Rappé taught voice at the Fryderyk Chopin University of Music in Warsaw and the Academy of Music Gdańsk. She often took part in vocal competitions as a member of the jury of vocal competitions both in Poland and abroad. She taught master courses. She was head of the board of the Witold Lutosławski Society from 2006 to 2009.

She passed to her students not only vocal technique, but "sensitivity, respect for the arts and an ethos of creative work". She is remembered by students as a modest personality with a "genuine dedication to others".

=== Death ===
Rappé died after a long illness on 16 May 2025, at the age of 73.

== Recordings ==
Rappé made around 60 recordings. Her recording of Szymanowski's 3 Fragments of Poems by J. Kasprowicz with pianist Maja Nosowska earned her the Polish Radio Award in 1982.

Her recordings include:

- Honegger: Le Roi David, conducted by Hager, with soloists, Munich Radio Orchestra and Choir (1991)
- Mozart: Coronation Mass, Vesperae solennes de confessore, conducted by Peter Schreier, with Edith Mathis, Hans Peter Blochwitz, Thomas Quasthoff, MDR Rundfunkchor, Staatskapelle Dresden (1993)
- Mozart: Requiem, Ave verum corpus, conducted by Peter Schreier, with Edith Mathis, Francisco Araiza, Theo Adam, MDR Rundfunkchor, Staatskapelle Dresden (1993)
- Penderecki: Seven Gates of Jerusalem, conducted by Kazimierz Kord, with soloists, Filharmonia Narodowa (2000)
- Mahler: Symphony No. 2 "Resurrection", conducted by Antoni Wit, with Hanna Lisovska, Cracow Radio and Television Choir, Polish National Radio Symphony Orchestra (2001)
- Lutosławski: Twenty Polish Christmas Carols, conducted by Antoni Wit, with Olʹha Pasichnyk, Piotr Nowacki, Cracow Radio and Television Choir, Polish National Radio Symphony Orchestra (2005)
- Szymanowski: Stabat Mater, Demeter, conducted by Wit, with Jadwiga Gadulanka and Andrzej Hiolski, Polish National Radio Symphony Orchestra (2002)
- Beethoven: Ninth Symphony, conducted by Colin Davis, with Sharon Sweet, Paul Frey, Franz Grundheber, Staatskapelle Dresden (2005)
- Penderecki: Polish Requiem, conducted by Antoni Wit, with Izabella Kłosińska, Ryszard Minkiewicz, Piotr Nowacki, Filharmonia Narodowa Chór, Filharmonia Narodowa (2006)
- Mahler: Symphony No. 8, conducted by Antoni Wit, with soloists, Warsaw Boys Choir, Warsaw National Philharmonic Choir and Orchestra (2006)
- Mozart: Mass in C minor, K. 139 "Waisenhaus", Exsultate, jubilate, conducted by Nikolaus Harnoncourt, with Barbara Bonney, Josef Protschka, Arnold Schoenberg Choir, Concentus Musicus Wien (2011)
- Mahler: Das Lied von der Erde, conducted by Michael Zilm, with Piotr Kusiewicz, Polish National Radio Symphony Orchestra (2011)
- Wagner: Der Ring des Nibelungen, conducted by Bernard Haitink, with soloists, Bavarian Radio Symphony Orchestra (2012)
- Mahler: Symphony No. 3, conducted by Heinz Rögner, Berliner Rundfunk Sinfonie-Orchester (2021)
