= Paweł Przytocki =

Polish conductor (born 1958)

- Born: Paweł Przytocki; September 13, 1958 (age 67); Krosno, Poland
- Origin: Kraków, Poland
- Genres: Classical
- Occupation: musician (conductor)
- Years active: 1983–present
- Formerly of: Krakow Philharmonic Orchestra

Paweł Przytocki (born 13 September 1958), is a Polish conductor of classical music.

== Early life ==
Przytocki was born in Krosno. He studied at the Academy of Music in Kraków, graduating with distinction from the Faculty of Conducting under Professor Jerzy Katlewicz in 1985. He perfected his skills at the Bartók International Seminar with Péter Eötvös and the Master Conducting Course within the Oregon Bach Festival in Eugene, Oregon, USA with Helmuth Rilling.

== Career ==
From 1983 to 1987, Przytocki conducted at the Krakow Philharmonic and, since 1987, at the Grand Theatre in Łódź. From 1988 to 1991, he was the conductor and music director of the Baltic Philharmonic in Gdańsk. He has worked with the Warsaw Philharmonic Orchestra in Warsaw in 1990, the Great Theatre and Polish National Opera in Warsaw in 1992, and since 1995, the Sinfonia Varsovia Orchestra . From 1995 to 1997, he was Artistic Director of the Artur Rubinstein Philharmonic in Łódz. From 2005 to 2007, Przytocki was the conductor at the Great Theatre and Polish National Opera in Warsaw.

From March 2009 to September 2012 Przytocki was Managing director and Artistic director of the Krakow Philharmonic and Krakow Philharmonic Orchestra in Poland.

From 2017/2018 season, Paweł Przytocki is Artistic Director of the Arthur Rubinstein Philharmonic.

Przytocki is a regular guest conductor with Polish and European symphonic orchestras. He conducted Budapest Concert Orchestra, Orchestra Sinfonica de Xalapa in Mexico, Real Filharmonia de Galicia in Spain, Capella Istropolitana in Bratislava, Philharmonisches Staatsorchester Halle, Neue Philharmonie Westfalen, Bilkent Symphony Orchestra Ankara, Everett Symphony Orchestra in the United States and Janáček Philharmonic Orchestra in Ostrava.

Przytocki has participated with Polish orchestras in numerous international music festivals, including the Athens Festival 1987, the Musikfest Stuttgart 1988, the Flanders Festival 1989, La Chaise-Dieu Festival 1996, Kissinger Sommer 1998, Bratislava Music Festival 1999, Prague Spring 2001, Wratislavia Cantans 2005.

He has recorded for the Polish Radio. His recordings on CDs have been released by Aurophon Classics, Point Classics and DUX Records.

== Discography ==
Uncompleted list of recordings:

- Rachmaninov: Symphony no 1 in D minor, Pawel Przytocki (Conductor), Philharmonic Orchestra in Gdańsk, Release Date: 1995-04-16, Audio CD, Aurophon Classics
- Mozart: Klavierkonzerte, Wolfgang Amadeus Mozart (Composer), Pawel Przytocki (Conductor), Capella Istroplitana (Ensemble), Capella Istropolitana (Orchestra), Christoph Soldan (Piano), Release Date: 30 May 2006 Label: K & K Verlagsanstalt
- Mozart: Klavierkonzerte Vol 2 – Edition Monastery Maulbronn, Wolfgang Amadeus Mozart (Composer), Pawel Przytocki (Conductor), Silesian Chamber Philharmonic (Orchestra/Ensemble), Christoph Soldan (Piano), Release Date: 27 June 2006 Label: K&K Verlagsanstalt
- The Beethoven Academy Orchestra performs Wieniawski, Bacewicz & Penderecki, Grazyna Bacewicz (Composer), Krzysztof Penderecki (Composer), Henryk Wieniawski (Composer), Pawel Przytocki (Conductor), Beethoven Academy (Orchestra), et al.
- The Art of Conduction, Antonín Dvořák (Composer), Wolfgang Amadeus Mozart (Composer), Recorded Sound (Composer), Pawel Przytocki (Conductor), Beethoven Akademie Orchestra Krakau (Orchestra), et al., Label: K&K Verlagsanstalt

== See also ==
- List of Polish people (music)
