= Wodiczko =

Wodiczko is a Polish surname. Notable people with the surname include:

- Bohdan Wodiczko (1911–1985), Polish conductor and music teacher
- Krzysztof Wodiczko (born 1943), Polish artist, son of Bohdan
