= Henryk Czyż =

Polish musician

- Born: 3 October 1882; Grudziądz, Poland
- Died: 29 March 1937 (aged 54); Warsaw, Poland
- Education: Nicolaus Copernicus University; Poznań State Academy of Music
- Occupations: Composer; Conductor; Music educator
- Organizations: Warsaw Opera; Kraków Philharmonic; Kraków State Academy of Music
- Awards: Cross of Merit of Poland; Knight's Cross of the Order of Polonia Restituta

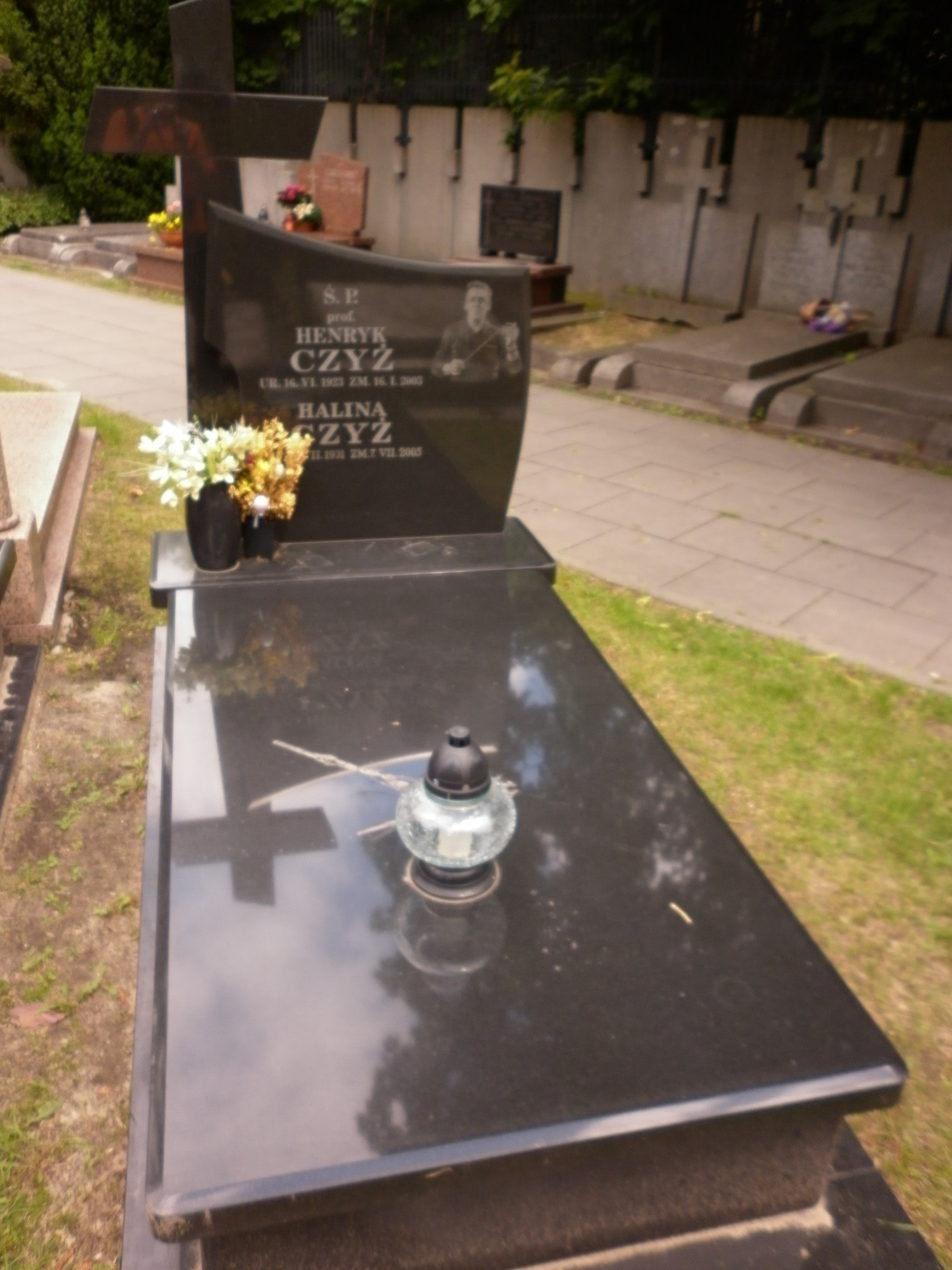
Grave of Henryk Czyż at the Powązki Military Cemetery in Warsaw

Henryk Czyż (16 June 1923 – 16 January 2003) was a Polish composer, conductor, and music educator.

== Biography ==
Born in Grudziądz, Czyż studied law and philosophy at the Nicolaus Copernicus University in Toruń from 1946 to 1948. He then studied composition with Tadeusz Szeligowski and conducting with Walerian Bierdiajew at the Poznań State Academy of Music until 1952. He was conductor of the Poznań Opera from 1952 to 1953, deputy conductor of the Polish National Radio Symphony Orchestra from 1953 to 1957, chief conductor and artistic director of the Łódź Symphony from 1957 to 1960, director of the Warsaw Opera from 1961 to 1962, and artistic director and principal conductor of the Kraków Philharmonic from 1963 to 1967. From 1962 to 1966, he led a conducting class at the Kraków State Academy of Music, where his students included Antoni Wit.

From 1971 to 1974, he served as general music director in Düsseldorf, and from 1972 onward, he also served as artistic director and chief conductor of the Łódź Philharmonic. From 1980 to 1995, he led a conducting class at the Warsaw Academy of Music. As a guest conductor, he has performed in almost every European country, the USA, and South America with the symphony orchestras of Leningrad, Berlin, Stockholm, and Madrid, the BBC Symphony Orchestra, and the Orchestra dell'Accademia Nazionale di Santa Cecilia. He has conducted numerous recordings, for which he has received awards including the Grand Prix du Disque and the Edison Award (for Krzysztof Penderecki's St. Luke Passion) and the Grand Prix Mondial du Quadrophonie (for Robert Schumann's Paradise and the Peri).

His extensive repertoire included classical music and oratorios, as well as works by modern and contemporary composers such as Igor Stravinsky, Claude Debussy, Arthur Honegger, and Krzysztof Penderecki. He has also authored several books on music and has championed the music of contemporary Polish composers on television programs. Among other awards, he was awarded the Golden Cross of Merit of the Republic of Poland (1953), the Knight's Cross of the Order of Polonia Restituta (1958), the First Prize of the Ministry of Culture (1975) and the State Prize First Class for his life's work (1978).
