= Capriccio for Violin and Orchestra (Penderecki) =

1967 composition by Krzysztof Penderecki

The Capriccio for Violin and Orchestra is a composition by Polish composer Krzysztof Penderecki. It is one of the five caprices that he composed and one of the two that he composed for a soloist with an orchestra, together with the Capriccio for Oboe and Eleven Instruments.

== Composition ==
This composition was finished in 1967 and was intended for performance in Donaueschingen, on October 22, 1967. On that occasion, Ernest Bour conducted the South West German Radio Orchestra, with Wanda Wilkomirska as the violin soloist. It was subsequently performed on the opening concert of the 1968 Festival of the International Society for Contemporary Music (ISCM), which was held during the 12th Warsaw Autumn Festival. It was eventually dedicated to ISCM's then president, Heinrich Strobel, and published by the Polish Music Publishing House and Moeck Musikinstrumente + Verlag and, later on, by Schott Music.

== Analysis ==
This unusual composition takes 10 minutes to perform. It is score for a very large and powerful set of instruments. The list of instruments used in this piece is as follows:

Woodwinds
4 flutes
4 oboes
3 clarinets in B♭
baritone saxophone
contrabass clarinet in B♭
3 bassoons
contrabassoon

Brass
6 horns in F
4 trumpets in B♭
4 trombones
tuba

Percussion
musical saw
vibraphone
bells I
bells II
4 timpani
2 bongos
bass drum
claves
5 wood blocks
ratchet
guiro
whip
4 cowbells
triangle
6 cymbals
2 gongs
gong ageng
2 tam-tams

Other
bass guitar
harp
harmonium
piano

Strings

solo violin

24 violins
10 violas
10 cellos
8 double basses

The composition has no tempo marking at the beginning, even though the last bars are marked as Tempo di Valse. It is mentioned in the score that two or three of the bells from the second bell set should be made of 24-karat gold. Contrary to its concertante nature, the cadenza is fairly close to the beginning.

== Notable recordings ==
Following are some of the most well-known recordings of this piece:

Violin	Orchestra	Conductor	Record Company	Year of Recording	Format
Wanda Wilkomirska	Polish Radio National Symphony Orchestra	Krzysztof Penderecki	EMI	1972	CD
Wanda Wilkomirska	MDR Leipzig Radio Symphony Orchestra	Herbert Kegel	Berlin Classics	2003	CD
Patrycja Piekutowska	Polish Radio National Symphony Orchestra	Krzysztof Penderecki	Dux Records	2007	CD
