= Kraków Philharmonic Hall =

Polish philharmonic society

Coordinates: 50°03′32″N 19°55′57″E

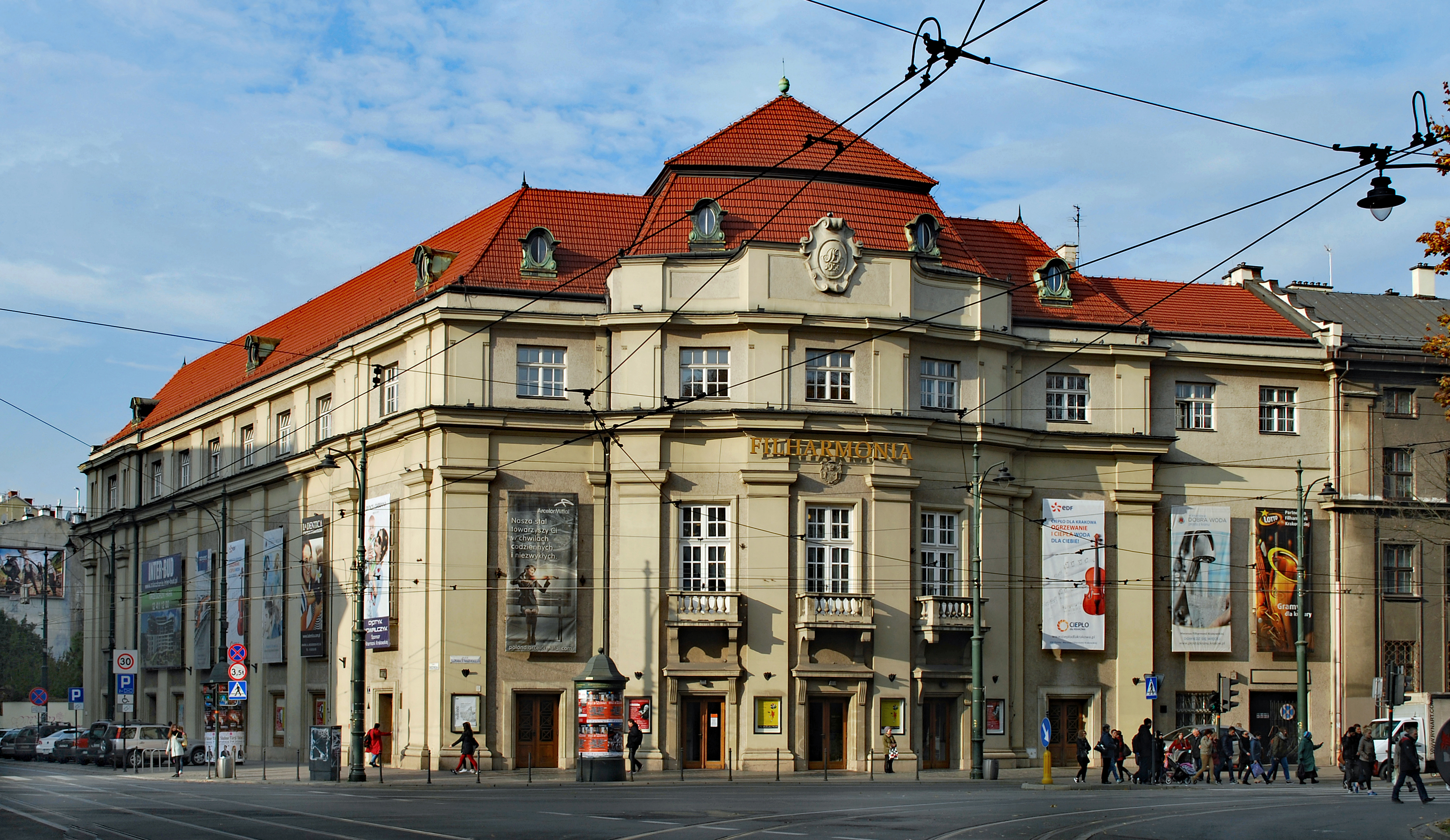
- Location: Kraków, Poland
- Seating type: Reserved seating
- Capacity: 693 (main stage)
- Type: Concert hall
- Event: Classical

Construction
- Opened: 1931

Website
- www.filharmonia.krakow.pl

The Kraków Philharmonic Hall (Polish: Filharmonia Krakowska) is the primary concert hall in Kraków, Poland. It is one of the largest auditoriums in the city. It consists of the main hall for orchestral performances with 693 seats, and two smaller venues, the Golden Hall and the Blue Hall, for chamber music concerts.

== Construction ==
The Kraków Philharmonic Hall was designed by architect Józef Pokutynski, with neo-baroque elements inspired by the Brussels' Maison du Peuple. It was sponsored by Prince and Cardinal Adam Stefan Sapieha, and completed 1931. In 1996, a new 50-pipe organ was installed in the hall, replacing an older one by Karl Schuke. It was designed and built by Klais Orgelbau of Bonn, a family-run company specializing in large-scale projects across the globe. The concert hall is home of the Kraków Philharmonic Orchestra as well as the chamber Capella Cracoviensis.

== History ==
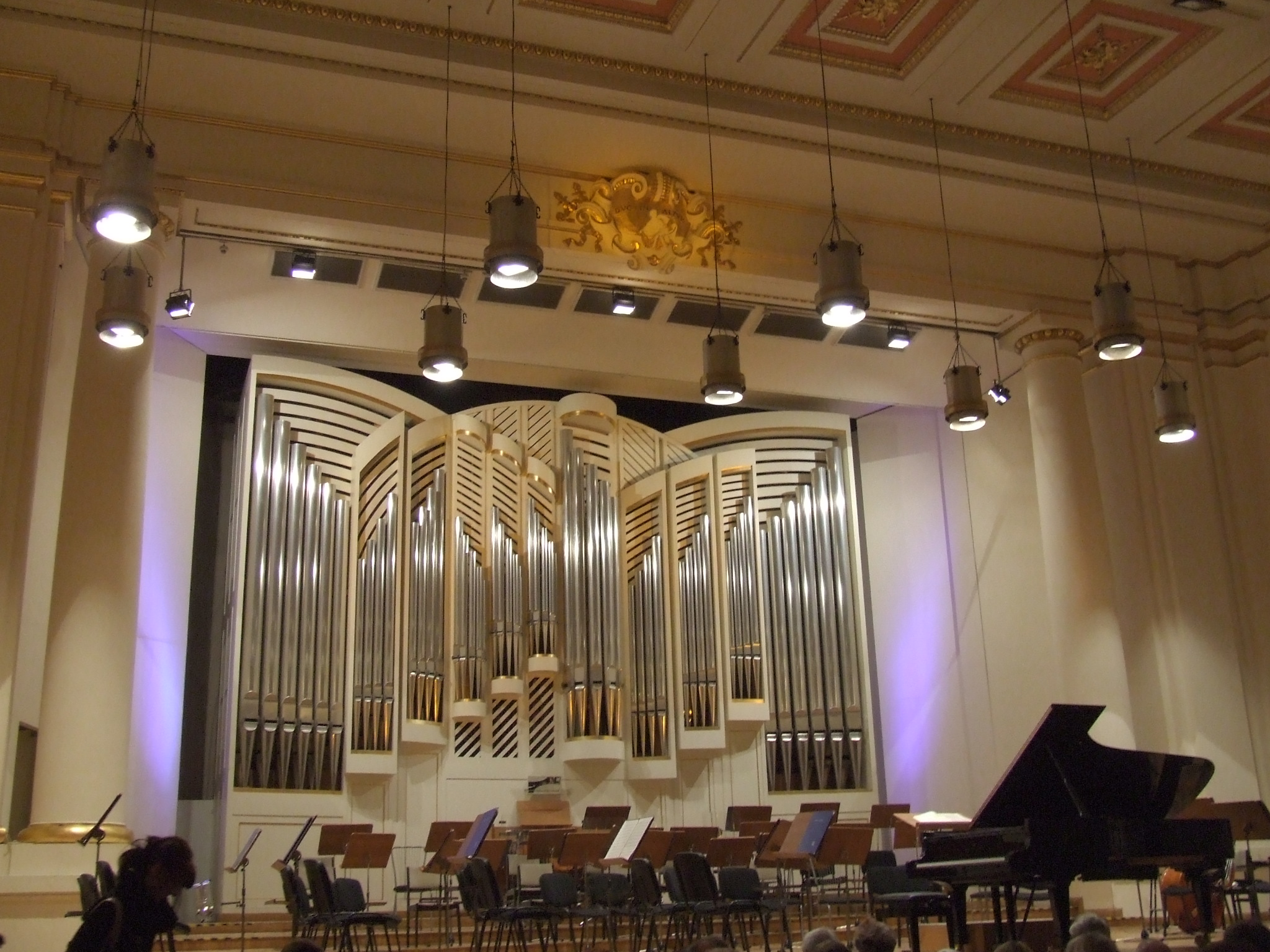
The interior of the Kraków Philharmonic Hall with the new Klais organ in the background

The first serious attempts to create a resident symphony orchestra in the city go back to the 18th century. The professional team was assembled only in 1909 under the management of composer Feliks Nowowiejski (b. 1877). Since its creation under the foreign Partitions of Poland, and throughout the interwar period, the Kraków Philharmonic maintained also the Polish Professional Musicians Trade Union for performers who worked around the city, including in cafés and in the silent movie theatres. The Union's goal was to protect the welfare of its members as well as the artistic level of their performances. Its main contribution to the local music culture was the organising of symphony concerts. The Philharmonic orchestra performed regularly until the Invasion of Poland in September 1939.

During the occupation of Poland on the order of Hans Frank, the Nazi Governor of the semi-colonial General Government set up in Kraków, a new Nur für Deutsche orchestra was formed in July 1940 under Gestapo chief Bruno Müller. It was called the General Government Symphony Orchestra.

The Symphony Orchestra now residing in the Kraków Philharmonic Hall began in February 1945. It was the first professional symphony orchestra in postwar Poland, under Professor Zygmunt Latoszewski.

Principal conductors and Music Directors of the Kraków Philharmonic in the past include Witold Rowicki, Prof. Krzysztof Penderecki, Gilbert Levine (1987–1993), Roland Bader of the Berlin Philharmonic Orchestra, Paweł Przytocki (March 2009 - September 2012) (Managing Director and Artistic Director) and many other renowned artists.

== Soloists ==
The long list of some of the world-renowned soloists, performing on stage of the Kraków Philharmonic Hall, includes: Victoria de los Angeles, Claudio Arrau, Gina Bachauer, Arturo Benedetti Michelangeli, Cathy Berberian, Stanislav Bunin, Shura Cherkassky, Zara Dolukhanova, Dorothy Dorow, Annie Fischer, Emil Gilels, Sidney Harth, Gary Karr, Nigel Kennedy, Leonid Kogan, Gidon Kremer, Nikita Magaloff, Witold Małcużyński, Yehudi Menuhin, Midori Gotō, Shlomo Mintz, Tatiana Nikolayeva, Lev Oborin, Garrick Ohlsson, David Oistrakh, Igor Oistrakh, Vlado Perlemuter, Maurizio Pollini, Ruggiero Ricci, Mstislav Rostropovich (known as Mścisław Rostropowicz in Poland), Sviatoslav Richter, Artur Rubinstein, Isaac Stern, Daniil Shafran, Henryk Szeryng, Narciso Yepes, Yo-Yo Ma, and Teresa Żylis-Gara, best-known Polish soprano who debuted there in 1956.
