= Jacek Kaspszyk =

Polish conductor

Jacek Kaspszyk (born 10 August 1952) is a Polish music conductor and was the Music and Artistic Director of the Warsaw National Philharmonic Orchestra from 2013 until the close of the 2018/2019 season.

He made his U.S. debut conducting Stanisław Moniuszko's Straszny dwór (translated as The Haunted Castle), given at the Michigan Opera Theatre in Detroit, in an English translation in October 1982.

He served, among other roles, as Music Director of the Great Symphony Orchestra of the Polish Radio and Television in Katowice (now the Polish National Radio Symphony Orchestra), the Capital Radio Wren Orchestra in London, as well as Artistic and Music Director (and, from 2002 to 2005, General Director) of the Grand Theatre – National Opera in Warsaw. From 2006 to 2013, he was the Artistic Director of the Symphony Orchestra of the Witold Lutosławski Philharmonic in Wrocław (currently the NFM Wrocław Philharmonic), and from January 2009 to January 2012, he served as Music Director of the NOSPR—the Polish National Radio Symphony Orchestra in Katowice.

In 2012, he was awarded the Elgar Medal. In 2014 Jacek Kaspszyk won the cultural award of Gazeta Wyborcza, the supplement "What is played" – "Inhale Audience" in the category "Man of the Year". On April 21, 2015, during a gala held at the Teatr Wielki – Polish National Opera to mark the 90th anniversary of Polish Radio, Jacek Kaspszyk was awarded the Diamond Baton.

== Recordings ==
Kaspszyk directed many orchestral performances on Polskie Nagrania Muza during the PPR years. In more recent years, he recorded on Collins Classics, EMI Classics and Warner Music Group.

Cultural offices
Preceded by Antoni Wit	Musical directors, Warsaw Philharmonic Orchestra; 2013–2019	Succeeded by Andrey Boreyko
