= Bamberg Symphony =

German orchestra founded in 1946

Coordinates: 49°53′49″N 10°52′45″E

- Orchestra
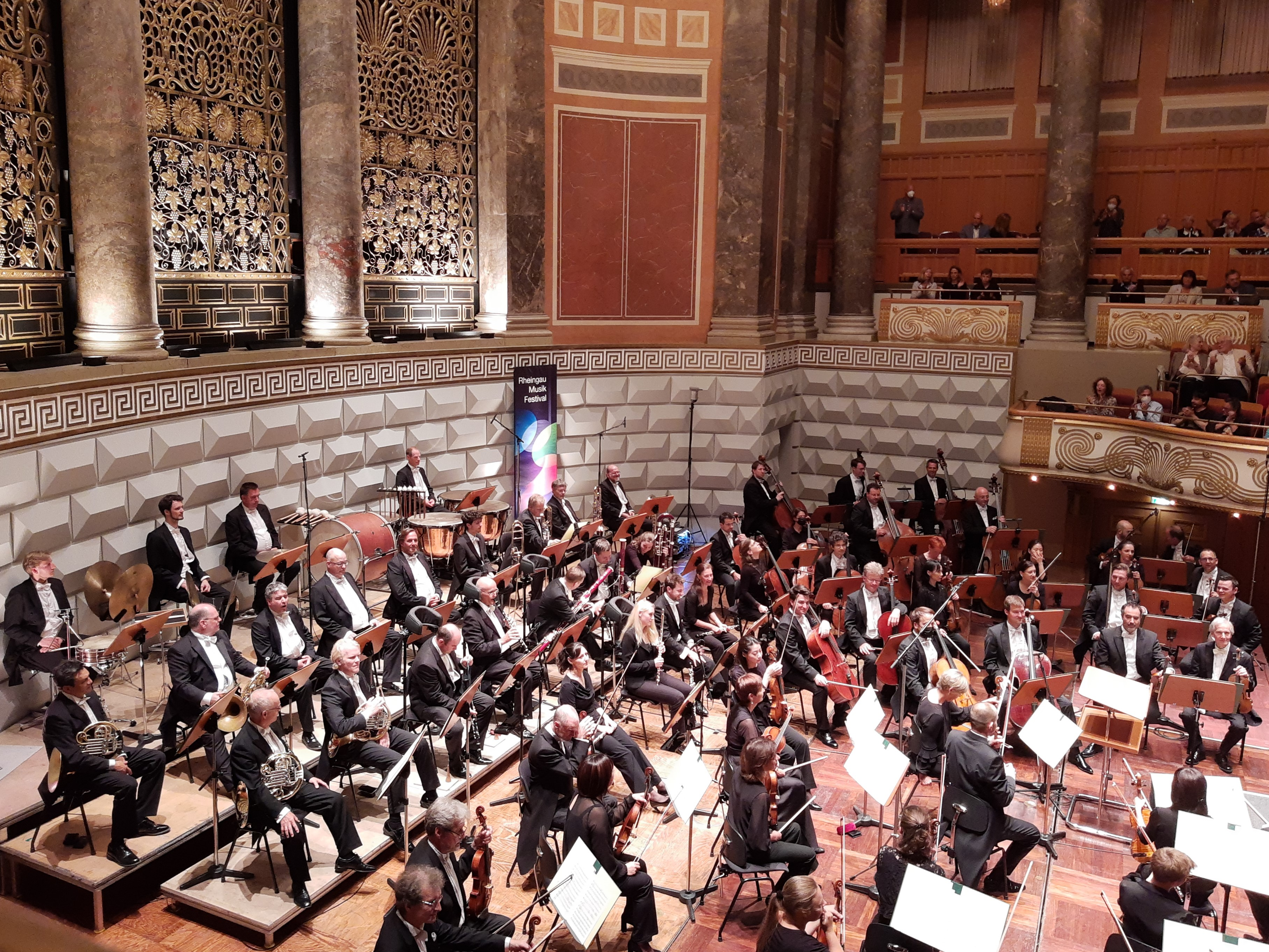
- Bamberger Symphoniker, Kurhaus Wiesbaden
- Founded: 1946
- Location: Bamberg, Germany
- Concert hall: Bamberg Concert Hall
- Principal conductor: Jakub Hrůša

The Bamberg Symphony (German: Bamberger Symphoniker – Bayerische Staatsphilharmonie) is a German professional orchestra that has resided in Bamberg since being founded in 1946 and regularly tours internationally.

The Bamberg Symphony was founded in 1946 by musicians who as a result of the Beneš decrees had been driven out of Bohemia, Moravia, the Czech Sudetenland as well as from German cities and had ended up in Bamberg. The "core" of the orchestra comprised former members of the German Philharmonic Orchestra Prague. The first concert of the orchestra was performed on March 20, 1946, in Bamberg. In July 1946, the orchestra was renamed the "Bamberg Symphony" (German: Bamberger Symphoniker).

The orchestra is recognized as an outstanding touring orchestra and has performed more than 7,500 concerts in 64 countries and over 530 cities in its history. It has worked with more than 500 guest conductors to date. Since 2004, it has held the title of state orchestra. The orchestra's musical roots trace back to Mahler and Mozart, and it is well known for its characteristic dark, full and resonant sound. Since the fall of 2016, the orchestra has been led by its sixth Chief Conductor, Czech-born Jakub Hrůša.

The Bamberg Symphony Orchestra is based in the Bamberg Concert Hall, which was opened in 1993 and acoustically optimized in 2008 by the Japanese acoustic designer Yasuhisa Toyota and has the nickname Sinfonie an der Regnitz (Symphony on the Regnitz). 2009 saw the concert hall undergo a comprehensive renovation and modernization following a concept by the designer Peter Schmidt.

== History ==
The link between Bamberg and Prague dates back to the 18th century: the orchestra of the Estates Theatre in Prague is regarded as the predecessor of the orchestra that performed under the directorship of Carl Maria von Weber from 1813 to 1816. The city's German theatre was also influenced by eminent artists such as Gustav Mahler. After the German occupation, the orchestra was re-established as the German Philharmonic Orchestra Prague. This orchestra performed under the direction of Joseph Keilberth in Prague until the end of the Second World War. The musicians had to flee in May 1945 during the Prague uprising. After the end of the Second World War, a number of top German-speaking musicians from Bohemia and Moravia arrived in Bamberg, after having been expelled by the Beneš decrees. The majority of these musicians, roughly two thirds, were former members of the German Philharmonic Orchestra Prague, who formed the Bamberg Symphony Orchestra in 1946.

The founding of the orchestra was decisively due to the commitment of a Bamberg citizens' committee. The first public concert was held under the name "Bamberger Tonkünstlerorchester" before the orchestra was renamed 'Bamberger Symphoniker' shortly after. The first conductors included Hans Schneider, Konrad Lechner, Hans Knappertsbusch, Herbert Albert, Georg Ludwig Jochum and finally Joseph Keilberth, who conducted his first concert in Bamberg in 1949. This reunion with Keilberth was a momentous milestone for the orchestra.

In September 2016, Jakub Hrůša became the sixth Chief Conductor of the Bamberg Symphony, with an initial contract of four seasons. In June 2018, the orchestra announced the extension of Hrůša's contract as its chief conductor through the 2025–2026 season. In December 2023, the orchestra announced a further extension of Hrůša's contract as chief conductor through the 2028–2029 season.

== Chief conductors ==
- Joseph Keilberth (1949–1968)
- James Loughran (1979–1983)
- Witold Rowicki (1983–1985)
- Horst Stein (1985–1996)
- Jonathan Nott (2000–2016)
- Jakub Hrůša (2016–present)

=== Joseph Keilberth ===
A key figure in the history of the Bamberg Symphony was Joseph Keilberth, who officially took up the post of Chief Conductor in Bamberg in January 1950. His artistic work, his reputation and his stringent approach to programming could hardly be overestimated in terms of shaping the Bamberg Symphony's national and international profile. From the very beginning, Keilberth's aim was to increase the number of radio recordings with the orchestra and to go on a tour in Germany and abroad.

In May 1950, as part of a grant from the Free State of Bavaria, the administrative district of Upper Franconia and the City of Bamberg, a work agreement was also signed with the Bavarian Broadcasting (Bayerischer Rundfunk), which scheduled a constant number of productions – the beginning of a media partnership that continues to this day.

During the Keilberth era, numerous renowned guest conductors were invited to conduct the "Bamberger", including Eugen Jochum, Hans Rosbaud, Fritz Lehmann, Georg Solti, Clemens Krauss, Lovro von Matačić, Heinrich Hollreiser, Robert Heger, André Cluytens, Heinz Wallberg and Rudolf Kempe.

The great concert hall of the Bamberg Concert and Congress Hall, which has been home to the Bamberg Symphony since 1993, is named after Joseph Keilberth.

=== Eugen Jochum – James Loughran – Horst Stein ===
After Keilberth's death in 1968, Eugen Jochum took over the artistic responsibility for the orchestra. Jochum's worldwide recognition as a Bruckner interpreter and his successes at the Würzburg Mozart Festival had cemented his reputation. In 1971, Jochum took over the position of Chief Conductor, and from 1973 he remained in close contact with the orchestra as a guest conductor. On the occasion of his 76th birthday, the Bamberg Symphony awarded Jochum the title of Honorary Conductor in November 1978. As Jochum's successor, the Hungarian István Kertész was introduced, but died in a swimming accident on the beach in Tel Aviv a few months before taking up his post, on 16 April 1973.

In the following 1973/1974 season, nine guest conductors took the baton in Bamberg, as the position of Chief Conductor was still vacant. On 1 April 1977, the Scotsman James Loughran finally introduced himself to the Bamberg Symphony as guest conductor. Like some of his predecessors, he drew public attention to the need for a suitable venue for the orchestra. On 4 February 1984, Loughran conducted his last concert with the Bamberg Symphony and the collaboration ended by mutual agreement on 31 August 1983. The Polish conductor Witold Rowicki took over as interim artistic director until his successor took office. The collaboration with him lasted until his death in 1989.

Horst Stein became the orchestra's Chief Conductor in 1985. His debut on the podium was followed by a partnership agreement between the orchestra and the Ariola record label. One of the milestones was the complete recording of Schubert's symphonies in collaboration with the Bayerischer Rundfunk in 1986. Together with Horst Stein, the Bamberg Symphony travelled through Germany and to the major European music capitals as well as several times to Asia and South America, for example. The Bamberg Symphony's first concert in Prague, the city of its historical roots, also took place under his baton in 1991. After the ground-breaking ceremony for the construction of the new concert hall on 25 November 1989, Stein conducted the opening concert in the newly erected Bamberg Concert Hall in September 1993 with Gustav Mahler's Symphony No. 8, the "Symphony of a Thousand". Stein held his post until 1996 and was appointed Honorary Conductor of the Bamberg Symphony.

=== Jonathan Nott ===
From January 2000, Jonathan Nott was Chief Conductor in Bamberg and took over the baton from his predecessors with enormous success. With him, a new profiling of the orchestra began, which involved turning more towards 20th century and contemporary music. In September 2011, Jonathan Nott extended his contract in Bamberg until 2016.

Jonathan Nott regularly performed with the Bamberg Symphony at all the major national and international festivals and went on numerous concert tours domestic and abroad. The performance in Castel Gandolfo in honour of Pope Benedict XVI on the occasion of the 1,000th anniversary of the diocese in Bamberg is one of the outstanding milestones of his era.

During his tenure, Jonathan Nott focused on the symphonies of Franz Schubert, Ludwig van Beethoven and Johannes Brahms, the classical modernism of Béla Bartók and Igor Stravinsky, as well as the works of György Ligeti. Works by Jörg Widmann, Wolfgang Rihm, Mark-Anthony Turnage and Bruno Mantovani received their world or German premieres in concerts of the Bamberg Symphony under Jonathan Nott, who was also responsible for concert performances of Beethoven's "Fidelio" and Richard Wagner's "Ring des Nibelungen" and "Tristan und Isolde".

Finally, the orchestra began focussing on the music of Mahler. The Bamberg Symphony has long been recognised as one of the world's leading Mahler orchestras. In 2013, they completed the CD cycle of all of Gustav Mahler's symphonies – a complete recording whose individual recordings have repeatedly been honoured with prestigious awards over the years, such as the MIDEM Classical Award or the International Record Prize "Toblacher Komponierhäuschen".

=== Jakub Hrůša ===
In autumn 2016, Jakub Hrůša succeeded Jonathan Nott and became the sixth Chief Conductor in the history of the Bamberg Symphony. It is the first time that a Czech has been appointed Chief Conductor of the orchestra. Hrůša cultivates the distinctive "Bohemian sound" and focuses on masterpieces of music history as well as world premieres and discoveries in his programming. In May 2019, the Bamberg Symphony opened the 74th Prague Spring Music Festival with him with the famous symphonic poem "Má vlast" from their Bohemian homeland.

Their first CD together was released shortly after Hrůša took office in October 2016, with Bedrich Smetana's "Má vlast" (My Fatherland) on the label Tudor. Since then, the orchestra and its conductor have been working on a Brahms-Dvořák edition in addition to other projects. On each of the four CDs already released as part of the project, a symphony by Brahms is paired with a symphony by Dvořák. Another important work is the symphony cycles by Beethoven, Bruckner, Mahler and Martinů. The intention is to discover the German-Czech musical tradition.

The regular recordings and productions with renowned artists on the podium and on the instrument attract widespread public and professional attention. As a conductor, Hrůša has received numerous awards and nominations for his discography. Most recently, he was honoured with the Bamberg Symphony in 2022 and 2023 with the ICMA Award for Symphonic Music for his recordings of Hans Rott's Symphony No. 1 and Bruckner's Symphony No. 4. In 2023, he was also named Opus Klassik Conductor of the Year for his recording of Rott's Symphony No. 1. Hrůša was the first recipient of the Sir Charles Mackerras Prize in 2015. In 2020, he was honoured with the Antonín Dvořák Prize of the Czech Academy of Classical Music. In the same year, the Bamberg Symphony Orchestra received the Bavarian State Prize for Music under his direction. After Hrůša was made an honorary member of the Royal Academy of Music in London in April 2023, he was awarded the Bavarian Culture Prize on 16 November 2023 for his services to the Bamberg Symphony.

Hrůša also serves as president of the jury of The Mahler Competition, now the most important conducting competition of its kind, which took place for the seventh time in Bamberg in 2023.

== CEOs, Honorary and Guest Conductors ==
=== CEO ===
- 1946–81: Hella Rappoldi
- 1981–95: Rolf Beck
- 1996–97: Francis Hunter
- 1999–2001: Matthias Weigmann
- 2002–08: Paul Müller
- 2008–13: Wolfgang Fink
- 2013–present: Marcus Rudolf Axt

=== Honorary Conductors ===
1. Eugen Jochum
2. Horst Stein, 1996
3. Herbert Blomstedt, appointment for life 2006
4. Christoph Eschenbach, 2016
5. Manfred Honeck, 2023

=== Guest Conductors ===
Guest conductors who have worked with the Bamberg Symphony to date include (in alphabetical order)

- Semyon Bychkow
- Riccardo Chailly
- Sergiu Celibidache
- Christoph von Dohnányi
- Gustavo Dudamel
- Christoph Eschenbach
- Ádám Fischer
- Iván Fischer
- Rafael Frühbeck de Burgos
- Alan Gilbert
- Daniel Harding
- Paul Hindemith
- Heinrich Hollreiser
- Manfred Honeck
- Marek Janowski
- Mariss Jansons
- Paavo Järvi
- Rudolf Kempe
- Aram Khatchaturian
- Hans Knappertsbusch
- Clemens Krauss
- Ferdinand Leitner
- Witold Lutosławski
- Ingo Metzmacher
- Kent Nagano
- Andris Nelsons
- Václav Neumann
- Roger Norrington
- Antonio Pappano
- Krzysztof Penderecki
- Mstislav Rostropovich
- Witold Rowicki
- Kurt Sanderling
- Wolfgang Sawallisch
- Lahav Shani
- Giuseppe Sinopoli
- Sir Georg Solti
- Günter Wand
- David Zinman

From 1995 to 1999, Ingo Metzmacher was Principal Guest Conductor of the Bamberg Symphony. Since 2005, the orchestra has enjoyed a close artistic collaboration with the British conductor Robin Ticciati. He held the position of Principal Guest Conductor from 2010 to 2013.

== National and international concert activity ==
=== Concert tours from the beginnings until today ===
Since its beginnings, the Bamberg Symphony has been recognised as one of the most well-travelled orchestras from Germany. They were the first to accompany official state delegations abroad after the Second World War and were the first German orchestra to visit France at that time.

With the exception of Australia, the orchestra has travelled to every continent in its history. Since its foundation, it has played more than 7,500 concerts in 64 countries and over 500 cities around the world. The "Bambergers" have performed 1,200 concerts abroad alone. The Bamberg Symphony currently consists of musicians from around 25 nations (as of November 2023).

=== The COVID-19 years ===
It was not until the COVID-19 pandemic that the orchestra experienced its first serious travel break from 2020 to 2022. Numerous planned projects and trips had to be postponed or even cancelled. Replacement concerts took place via live streaming on television with medici.tv, on the radio and online. With their first purely digital premiere "Reflections of hope – A symphonic answer to the Corona pandemic" by Eduard Resatsch, the Bamberg Symphony made a musical statement during the pandemic in May 2020.

Playing music together was also influenced by the changing hygiene regulations and distancing rules, with the Bamberg Symphony following its own approach: an airflow measurement, in which external experts examined which airflows escape from the instruments when playing, contributed to the orchestra musicians being able to play CD recordings together at a distance of 1.05 metres from each other and, with the introduction of pandemic relaxations, being allowed to join the audience in the orchestra's concert halls again. The practical test with wind instruments conducted by the Bamberg Symphony in 2020 led the participating experts to determine that wind instruments do not contribute to air and therefore aerosol circulation in the orchestra body to the extent that was originally hypothesised. The Bamberg practical study became the impetus for other institutions, such as the US National Association for Music Education (NAfME), to undertake further studies in this field and contributed to the facilitation and normalisation of playing and performance practice.

== Funding ==
In 2004, the Bamberg Symphony was appointed Bavarian State Philharmonic Orchestra by a new state law, which was approved by all parliamentary factions of the Bavarian State Parliament. The Foundation Bamberg Symphony – Bavarian State Philharmonic is funded by grants from the Free State of Bavaria, the City of Bamberg, the District of Upper Franconia and the District of Bamberg.

The orchestra also receives support from the "Friends of the Bamberg Symphony" (German: "Freunde der Bamberger Symphoniker e. V."), the Bamberg Symphony Endowment Foundation as well as various patrons and sponsors.

== Conducting Competition: The Mahler Competition ==
Since 2004, the Bamberg Symphony Orchestra has organised "The Mahler Competition" at the Bamberg Concert Hall once every three years. The conducting competition, committed to the artistic credo and personality of its namesake Gustav Mahler, immediately established itself at the forefront of comparable competitions. The seventh edition took place in July 2023.

The winners today include renowned conductors such as Gustavo Dudamel, Shi-Yeon Sung, Ainārs Rubiķis, Lahav Shani, Kahchun Wong, Finnegan Downie Dear and, most recently in 2023, Giuseppe Mengoli.

== World premieres ==
- Friedrich Cerha: Bagatelle (2016, conductor: Jonathan Nott)
- Chaya Czernowin: Once I blinked nothing was the same / a large scale miniature (2015, conductor: Jonathan Nott)
- Gottfried von Einem: Nachtstück (op. 29, 1962, conductor: Joseph Keilberth)
- Georg Friedrich Haas: Zugabe (2016, conductor: Kah Chun Wong)
- Toshio Hosokawa: Umarmung. Licht und Schatten (2016, conductor: Jakub Hrůša)
- Bruno Mantovani: Mit Ausdruck (2003, conductor: Jonathan Nott); Time stretch (on Gesualdo) (2006, conductor: Jonathan Nott)
- Thomas Daniel Schlee: Bis (2017, conductor: Manfred Honeck)
- Mauricio Sotelo: Bruckner Nachklang (2014, conductor: Jonathan Nott)
- Erkki-Sven Tüür: Tormiloits (Incantation of Tempest) (2015, conductor: Jakub Hrůša)
- Mark-Anthony Turnage: Juno and The Torino Scale (from: Asteroids for Orchestra) (2007, conductor: Jonathan Nott)
- Jörg Widmann: Lichtstudie I (2001, conductor: Christoph Poppen), Lied für Orchester (2003, conductor: Jonathan Nott), Das heiße Herz und Bamberger Marsch (2018, conductor: Jakub Hrůša)
- Eduard Resatsch: Reflections of Hope (2020 – first digital world premiere by the Bamberg Symphony)

== Discography (selection) ==
The Bamberg Symphony Orchestra and the Bayerische Rundfunk have maintained a close media partnership since 1950, resulting in more than 2,500 works recorded for radio and a discography that have built up over the decades. The orchestra also has a close relationship with Deutsche Grammophon and Accentus Music, which has resulted in numerous releases, some of them award-winning.

One major artistic project that the Bamberg Symphony produced under Jonathan Nott over a period of almost ten years is the recording of all of Gustav Mahler's completed symphonies. Some of these recordings have been highly praised by the international press and received prestigious awards.

In 2023, the Bamberg Symphony completed its highly acclaimed Brahms-Dvořák cycle with Jakub Hrůša.

The following discography only includes a selection of the releases:

- Johannes Brahms: Symphony No. 4, Antonín Dvořák: Symphony No. 9 „From the New World“. Brahms-Dvořák-Cycle with Jakub Hrůša: Vol. 1. 2 CD release, Tudor 1744 SACD Hybrid
- Johannes Brahms: Symphony No. 3, Antonín Dvořák: Symphony No. 8. Brahms-Dvořák-Cycle with Jakub Hrůša: Vol. 2. 2 CD release, Tudor 1743 SACD Hybrid
- Johannes Brahms: Symphony No. 2, Antonín Dvořák: Symphony Nr. 7. Brahms-Dvořák-Cycle with Jakub Hrůša: Vol. 3. Tudor 1742 SACD Hybrid
- Johannes Brahms: Symphony Nr. 1 and 8 Hungarian Dances, Antonín Dvořák: Symphony No. 6. Brahms-Dvořák-Cycle with Jakub Hrůša: Vol. 4. Tudor 1741 SACD Hybrid
- Anton Bruckner: Symphony No. 3 (Wagner Symphony, first version from 1873). Conductor: Jonathan Nott. Tudor CD 7133 SACD Hybrid
- Anton Bruckner: Symphony No. 4 (Romantic, version from 1878/1880). Conductor: Horst Stein. CD Eurodisc/BMG Ariola 257 873
- Anton Bruckner: Symphony No. 4 (3 versions + alternative movements and fragments). Conductor: Jakub Hrůša. Accentus Music ACC30533 (4 CDs)
- Anton Bruckner: Symphony No. 8 (version from 1890). Live recording from the NHK Hall Tokyo on 15 September 1982. Conductor: Eugen Jochum. CD Altus ALT 022/023 (2 CDs) and DVD Altus ALTDVD001
- Antonin Dvořák: Symphony No. 9. Conductor: Jakub Hrůša. Direct-to-Disc-Recording (limited edition, 1893 records), Accentus Music (3 LPs)
- Karl Amadeus Hartmann: Symphony No. 1 (Versuch eines Requiems), Bohuslav Martinů: Mahnmal für Lidice, Luigi Nono: Canti di vita e' d'amore, Arnold Schönberg: Ein Überlebender aus Warschau. Conductor: Ingo Metzmacher. EMI 5 55424 2
- Karl Amadeus Hartmann: Adagio (Symphony No. 2) and Symphony concertante (Symphonie Nr. 5), Igor Strawinsky: Symphony in three movements. Conductor: Ingo Metzmacher. EMI 5 56184 2
- Karl Amadeus Hartmann: Symphony No. 3, Charles Ives: Robert Browning Overture. Conductor: Ingo Metzmacher. EMI 5 55254 2
- Karl Amadeus Hartmann: Symphony No. 4, Olivier Messiaen: Et exspecto resurrectionem mortuorum. Conductor: Ingo Metzmacher. EMI 7 54916 2
- Karl Amadeus Hartmann: Symphony No. 6, Anton Webern: Sechs Stücke für Orchester op. 6 (Fassung von 1928), Alban Berg: Drei Orchesterstücke op. 6. Conductor: Ingo Metzmacher. EMI 5 55612 2
- Karl Amadeus Hartmann: Symphonyn No. 7 und No. 8. Conductor: Ingo Metzmacher. EMI 5 56427 2
- Karl Amadeus Hartmann: Miserae und Gesangsszene, Luigi Dallapiccola: Canti di liberazione. Conductor: Ingo Metzmacher. EMI 56468 2
- Leoš Janáček: Sinfonietta, Taras Bulba and Suite from The Cunning Little Vixen. Conductor: Jonathan Nott. Tudor CD 7135 SACD Hybrid
- Gustav Mahler: Symphony No. 1 (Der Titan). Conductor: Jonathan Nott. Tudor CD 7147 SACD Hybrid
- Gustav Mahler: Symphony No. 2 (Resurrection Symphony). Conductor: Jonathan Nott, Soprano: Anne Schwanewilms, Alto: Lioba Braun, Chorus of the Bamberg Symphony. Tudor CD 7158 SACD Hybrid (2 CDs)
- Gustav Mahler: Symphony No. 3. Conductor: Jonathan Nott, Mezzo Soprano: Mihoko Fujimura. Tudor CD 7170 SACD Hybrid (2 CDs)
- Gustav Mahler: Symphony No. 4. Conductor: Jonathan Nott, Soprano: Mojca Erdmann. Tudor CD 7151 SACD Hybrid
- Gustav Mahler: Symphony No. 4. Conductor: Jakub Hrůša, Soprano: Anna Lucia Richter. Accentus Music ACC30532
- Gustav Mahler: Symphony No. 5. Conductor: Jonathan Nott. Tudor CD 7126 SACD Hybrid
- Gustav Mahler: Symphony No. 6 (Tragic). Conductor: Jonathan Nott. Tudor CD 7191 SACD Hybrid
- Gustav Mahler: Symphony No. 7. Conductor: Jonathan Nott. Tudor CD 7176 SACD Hybrid
- Gustav Mahler: Symphony No. 8 (Symphony of the Thousand). Conductor: Jonathan Nott, Soloists: Janina Baechle, Lioba Braun, Michaela Kaune, Marisol Montalvo, Manuela Uhl, Albert Dohmen, Michael Nagy, Stefan Vinke, Chorus of the Bamberg Symphony, Czech Philharmonic Chorus, Windsbacher Boys Choir. Tudor CD 7192 SACD Hybrid
- Gustav Mahler: Symphony No. 9. Conductor: Jonathan Nott. Tudor CD 7162 SACD Hybrid (2 CDs)
- Gustav Mahler: Symphony No. 9. Conductor: Herbert Blomstedt. Accentus Music 9154444 (2 CDs)
- Gustav Mahler: The 9 Symphonies. Conductor: Jonathan Nott. Tudor 1670
- Bohuslav Martinů. Complete Symphonies. Conductor: Neeme Järvi. Brilliant Classics (Edel) (3 CDs)
- Wolfgang Amadeus Mozart: Piano Concertos Vol. 1–10. Conductor: Frank Beermann, Piano: Matthias Kirschnereit. ARTE NOVA CLASSICS 82876 82576 2
- Wolfgang Amadeus Mozart: Symphonies No. 33 und No. 36 (Linzer). Conductor: Eugen Jochum. Eurodisc 610 278-231
- Wolfgang Amadeus Mozart: Symphonies No. 39 und No. 40. Conductor: Eugen Jochum. Orfeo C 045 901 A
- Wolfgang Amadeus Mozart: Symphony No. 41 (Jupiter) and Maurerische Trauermusik. Conductor: Eugen Jochum. Orfeo C 045 902 A
- Joseph Joachim Raff: Symphonies No. 1–11, 4 Suites for orchestra, 4 Ouvertures: Benedetto Marcello, Dame Kobold, Die Parole, Concert Ouverture, Chaconne, Rhapsodie: Abends. Conductor: Hans Stadlmair. Tudor CD 1600 9 CD-Box
- Max Reger: Eine Ballett-Suite op. 130; Variations and Fugue on a theme by Mozart op. 132 for orchestra. Conductor: Joseph Keilberth. Warner 0190295974824
- Max Reger: Orchestral Edition. Symphonic Choral Works. Orchestral Songs. Conductor: Horst Stein. Deutsche Grammophon 479 9983 (12 CDs)
- Hans Rott: Symphonie No. 1, Gustav Mahler: Blumine, Anton Bruckner: Symphonic Prelude, Conductor: Jakub Hrůša. Deutsche Grammophon 143056
- Camille Saint-Saëns: Suite for Cello and Orchestra op. 16, Romance op. 36; Antonín Dvořák: Concerto for Cello and orchestra B minor op. 104. Conductor: Sebastian Tewinkel, Cello: Maximilian Hornung. Sony 88697749252
- Franz Schubert: Symphonies No. 1–8, Dialog, Epilog. Conductor: Jonathan Nott. Tudor CD 1610 SACD, 6 CD-Box Limited Edition
- Franz Schubert: The 8 Symphonies. Conductor: Jonathan Nott. Tudor CD 1660 SACD Hybrid 4 CD-Box
- Robert Schumann: Symphonies Nr. 1–4. Conductor: Christoph Eschenbach. Virgin Classics 7243 5 61884 2 6
- Bedřich Smetana: Die verkaufte Braut. Conductor: Rudolf Kempe. With Fritz Wunderlich u. a. EMI 3818722
- Bedřich Smetana: Má Vlast. Conductor: Jakub Hrůša. Tudor CD 7196 SACD Hybrid
- Bedřich Smetana: Má Vlast, Conductor: Jakub Hrůša, Direct-To-Disc Recording, Limited Edition, Accentus Music
- Hans Sommer: Sapphos Gesänge op. 6, Orchestra songs (Dahn/Goethe). Conductor: Sebastian Weigle, Mezzo Soprano: Elisabeth Kulman, Baritone: Bo Skovhus, Tudor CD 7178 SACD Hybrid.
- Richard Strauss: Till Eulenspiegels lustige Streiche, Waltz Sequences from Der Rosenkavalier, Don Juan. Conductor: Eugen Jochum. BMG 74321 21287 2
- Igor Strawinsky: Le sacre du Printemps, Symphony in three movements. Conductor: Jonathan Nott. Tudor CD 7145 SACD Hybrid
- Charles-Marie Widor: Symphony No. 3 op. 69 for Organ and Orchestra, Symphonie VII for Orgel solo op. 42 Nr. 3. Conductor: Stefan Solyom, Orgel: Christian Schmitt. cpo 777 678-2
- Bohemia lies within ourselves. Why the sound of the Bamberg Symphony touches people. An audio book with the voices of Nora Gomringer, Jens Harzer and Meike Rötzer. Accentus Music ACC30534 (4 CDs)
- Italian Perspectives, Riccardo Frizza (conductor). PENTATONE, 2026

== Recent awards ==
- 2013: ECHO Klassik in the category Concert Recording of the Year (Music of the 19. century) for the recording of the Widor Organ Symphonies opp. 42,3 and 69.
- 2014: Up-and-comer of the year, Cicero
- 2018: Best concert programme 2017/18, Deutscher Musikverleger-Verband
- 2019: Audience of the year, concerti
- 2020: Bavarian State Prize for Music and Professional Music-Making
- 2020: Year Award of the Deutsche Schallplattenkritik for Gustav Mahler: Symphony No. 9. Conductor: Herbert Blomstedt (Accentus Music).
- 2022: International Classical Music Award (ICMA) in the category Symphonic Music for Bruckner 4 – The 3 Versions. Conductor: Jakub Hrůša (Accentus Music).
- 2023: International Classical Music Award (ICMA) in the category Symphonic Music for Hans Rott: Symphony No. 1, Mahler: Blumine, Bruckner: Symphonic Prelude. Conductor: Jakub Hrůša (Deutsche Grammophon).

== Positioning and reception ==
The Bamberg Symphony is the only orchestra with a worldwide standing that is not based in a major city and has earned a reputation as a touring orchestra thanks to its constant travelling. The orchestra has cemented its reputation since 1946 with its characteristically dark, round and radiant sound. With about 7,500 concerts in more than 500 cities and 64 countries around the world (as of 06/2024), the Bamberg Symphony acts as "Bavaria's cultural ambassador" throughout the world. "Resonating worldwide" is also the orchestra's slogan.

In 2004, they were awarded the title of state orchestra. In January 2009, the German Focus magazine listed the Bamberg Symphony Orchestra in 6th place among the ten leading symphony orchestras in Germany. In January 2014, Cicero magazine named the symphony orchestra one of the "Rising Stars of the Year". In 2018, the orchestra was awarded the prize for the "Best Concert Programme" of the 2017/2018 season by the German Music Publishers Association (DMV). In 2023, the orchestra won the International Classical Music Awards in the category of Symphonic Music. The orchestra is regarded as one of the best Mahler orchestras in the world and a world-class orchestra.

== Literature ==
- Klaus Karger: Im Himmel wird nicht geknarzt, Köstlichkeiten aus dem Leben der Bamberger Symphoniker. Genniges Verlag, Roth 2013, ISBN 978-3-924983-47-5.
- Thomas Keilberth: Joseph Keilberth. Ein Conductorenleben im XX. Jahrhundert. Apollon-Musikoffizin Austria, Vienna 2007. ISBN 978-3-9501190-6-0
- Zdenek Nemec: Weberova prazská léta. Z kroniky prazké opery. Praha: Mazác, 1944.
- Holger Noltze (Hg.), Andreas Herzau, Jiatong Wu: Bamberg Diary #1 - #3. Nimbus. Kunst und Bücher AG Verlag, Wädenswil am Zürichsee, 2020, 2021, 2023. ISBN 978-3-03850-074-2, ISBN 978-3-03850-081-0, ISBN 978-3-03850-092-6
- Wolfgang Pfister: Die Bamberger Symphoniker. 50 Jahre Orchesterkultur in Bamberg. Verlag Fränkischer Tag, Bamberg 1996. ISBN 978-3-928648-21-9
- Ulrich Ruhnke: Im diplomatischen Dienst. Die Bamberger Symphoniker auf Erfolgskurs. In: Das Orchester 4, April 2008, S. 30–34.
- Christian Schmölder, Peter Gartiser, Susanne Krabusch: Bamberger Symphoniker. Chronik eines Orchesters 1946–1993. Verlag Fränkischer Tag, Bamberg 1993. ISBN 978-3-928648-11-0
- Pamela Tancsik: Die Prager Oper heißt Zemlinsky. Theatergeschichte des Neuen Deutschen Theaters Prag in der Ära Zemlinsky 1911–1927. Böhlau Verlag, Wien 2000. ISBN 978-3-205-99068-0
- Festschrift Bamberger Symphoniker 1946–1996. Published by the Bamberger Symphoniker. Bamberg 1996. ISBN 978-3-928648-11-0
- Horst Stein zum 80. Geburtstag. Special publication of the Bamberg Symphony – Bavarian State Philharmonic. Bamberg 2008.
