= Heinrich Hollreiser =

German conductor

Heinrich Hollreiser (24 June 1913 – 24 July 2006) was a German conductor.

Born in Munich, he attended the State Academy of Music there and went on to serve as the conductor at the opera houses in Wiesbaden, Darmstadt, Mannheim, and Duisburg. From 1942–1945, he served as the principal conductor of the Bavarian State Opera, while serving as the music director at the Opera in Düsseldorf. From 1945–1951, he conducted concerts for the Berlin Philharmonic and Bamberg Symphony Orchestra, as well for the Hamburg, Cologne, and Frankfurt Radio Symphony Orchestras. He also made several guest appearances in Madrid and Barcelona. After 1951, he served as principal conductor of the Vienna State Opera, conducting the Austrian premiere of Stravinsky's The Rake's Progress.

In one of his recordings with the Bamberg Symphony Orchestra, he is credited as "George Richter".
