= Jerzy Katlewicz =

Polish music conductor and pianist

- Born: Jerzy Katlewicz; 2 April 1927; Bochnia, Poland
- Died: 16 November 2015 (aged 88); Kraków, Poland
- Occupations: Conductor, lecturer, pianist
- Years active: 1955–2015
- Spouse: Irena Katlewicz
- Children: 2
- Awards: Order of Polonia Restituta Złoty Medal Gloria Artis Pro Ecclesia et Pontifice Order of St. Gregory the Great Order Zasługi

Jerzy Katlewicz (2 April 1927 in Bochnia – 16 November 2015 in Kraków) was a Polish music conductor, pianist and Professor of the Academy of Music in Kraków since 1990. Katlewicz graduated from the same Academy in 1952 (then called Państwowa Wyższa Szkoła Muzyczna in Kraków), and served as conductor of the Kraków Philharmonic between 1952 and 1958 during the period of Stalinism in Poland (and its aftermath).

He was appointed artistic director there a decade later, in 1968 and remained at his post until 1981. In 1961-68 he was artistic director of Polish Baltic Opera and Philharmonic in Gdańsk. In 1984–1985 he was artistic director of the Symphony Orchestra and Choir of the Polish Radio and Television state agency in Kraków. Katlewicz was the recipient of the Commander's Cross with Star of the Order of Merit of the Republic of Poland (1993), among other distinctions.

Born in Bochnia, he died on 16 November 2015 in Kraków.

== Awards ==
- 1993 Poland: Commander's Cross with Star of the Order of Merit of the Republic of Poland
- 1993 Vatican: Decoration of Honour
- 1999 Vatican: Order of St. Gregory the Great

== Discography ==
- 1976 Canticum Canticorum Salomonis / Strophes / Cantata (LP), Polskie Nagrania Muza
- 1980 III Symfonia Pieśni Żałosnych Na Sopran I Orkiestrę Op. 36 (Symphony No. 3, The Symphony Of Sorrowful Songs For Soprano And Orchestra Op. 36), 3 versions; Polskie Nagrania Muza
1. 1980 III Symfonia Pieśni Żałosnych Na Sopran I Orkiestrę Op. 36 (Symphony No. 3, The Symphony Of Sorrowful Songs For Soprano And Orchestra Op. 36), LP, Album; Polskie Nagrania Muza
2. 1993 III Symfonia - Symfonia Pieśni Żałosnych Na Sopran I Orkiestrę Op. 36 (Cass, Album, RE) Polskie Nagrania Muza
3. 1993 Symphony No. 3 / Symfonia Pieśni Żałosnych Na Sopran I Orkiestrę Op.36 (CD, Album, RE) Polskie Nagrania Muza
- 1986 Mazurian Chronicles II / Musica Humana, (LP) Polskie Nagrania Muza
- Symphony No.3, Three Pieces In The Olden Style - Amen For Choir (CD, Album)
