= Jan Krenz =

Polish composer and conductor (1926–2020)

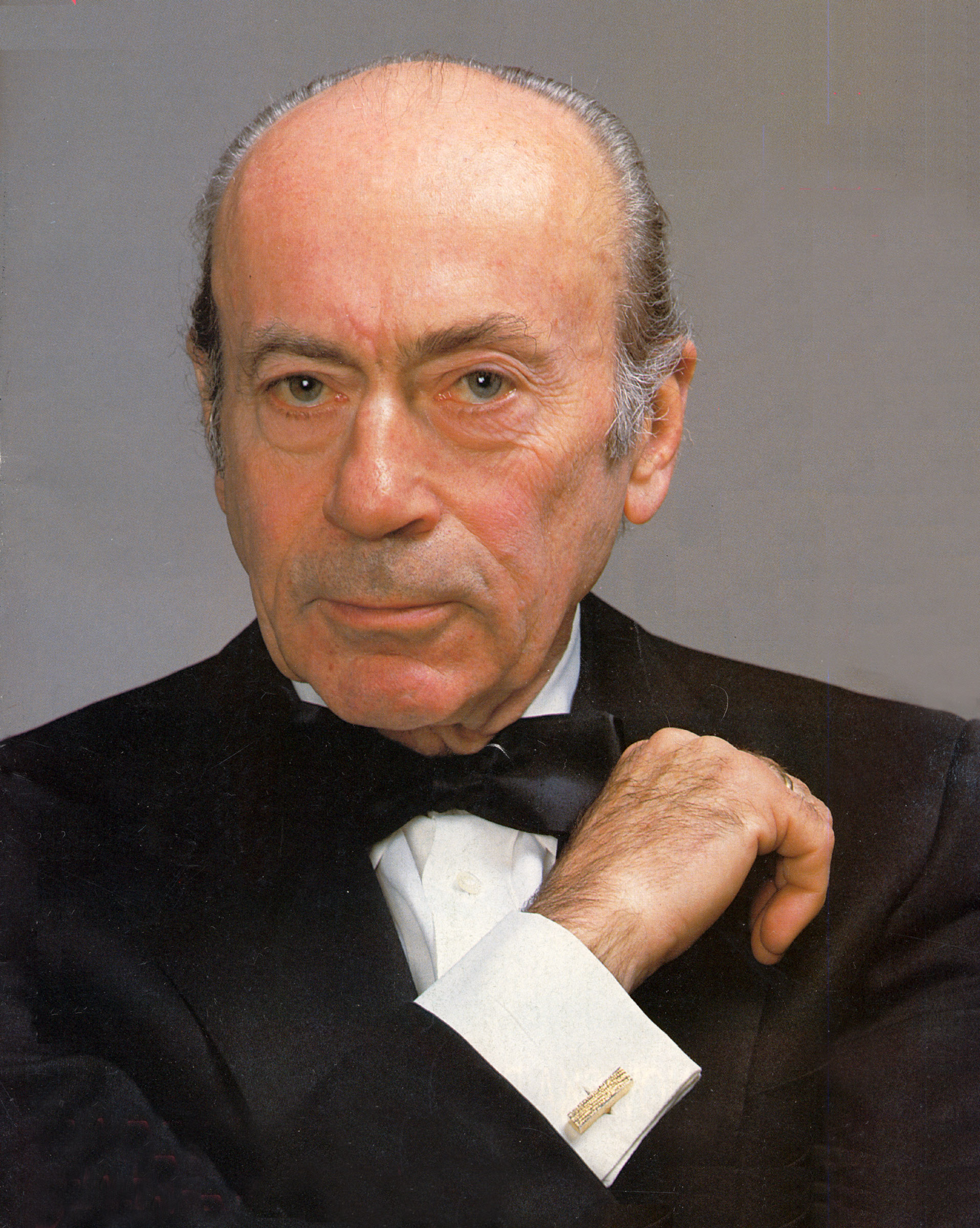
- Jan Krenz
- Born: 14 July 1926; Włocławek, Second Polish Republic
- Died: 15 September 2020 (aged 94)
- Occupations: Composer; Conductor

Jan Krenz (14 July 1926 – 15 September 2020) was a Polish composer and orchestra conductor.

== Biography ==
During World War II, Krenz studied piano with Zbigniew Drzewiecki and composition with Kazimierz Sikorski. From 1945 to 1947, he studied at the Academy of Music in Łódź, conducting with Kazimierz Wiłkomirski and composing with Sikorski.

In 1949, Krenz began serving under Grzegorz Fitelberg as deputy conductor at the Polish National Radio Symphony Orchestra. After Fitelberg's death, Krenz became director of the orchestra from 1953 to 1968. In 1968, he became artistic director of the Grand Theatre in Warsaw, and was General Director of Music in Bonn from 1979 to 1982. At the same time, he directed the Danish National Symphony Orchestra in Copenhagen. He was a guest conductor at the Radio Filharmonisch Orkest in Hilversum. He also often performed with the Yomiuri Nippon Symphony Orchestra in Tokyo. Other orchestras he led include the Detroit Symphony Orchestra, the Berlin Philharmonic, the Saint Petersburg Philharmonic Orchestra, Czech Philharmonic and the Royal Concertgebouw Orchestra.

On 26 March 1958, Krenz was the first person to conduct Musique funèbre by Witold Lutosławski. In addition to conducting many orchestras, he has also written a number of compositions.

Jan Krenz died on 15 September 2020 at the age of 94.

== Works ==
- I kwartet smyczkowy (1943)
- Tryptyk na głos i fortepian (1946)
- Symfonia nr 1 (1947–1949)
- Serenada klasyczna na małą orkiestrę (1950)
- Dwie śpiewki (smutna i wesoła) na chór a cappella (1950)
- Kwartet na flet, obój, klarnet i fagot (1950)
- Dwa miasta, kantata na dwa chóry i orkiestrę (1950)
- Taniec symfoniczny na orkiestrę (1951)
- Serenada wiejska na małą orkiestrę (1951)
- Rapsodia na orkiestrę smyczkową, ksylofon, tam-tam, kotły i czelestę (1952)
- Concertino na fortepian i małą orkiestrę (1952)
- Musica per clarinetto solo (1958)
- Capriccio na 24 instrumenty (1961–1962)
- Messa breve per coro e campane (1982)
- Maski – tryptyk symfoniczny na orkiestrę (1982–1985)
- Musica da camera (Quartetto No. 3) per quartetto d’archi (1983)
- Sonatina per due violini soli (1986)
- Epitaphion na orkiestrę (1989–1990)
- Symfonia nr 2 (quasi una fantasia) (1989–1992)
- Sinfonietta per fiati (1994–1995)
- Impromptu pour violoncelle (1997)
- Tristan in memoriam. Postludium per quartetto d’archi (1997)
- Aria i Perpetuum Mobile na orkiestrę (2004)
- Uwertura na orkiestrę symfoniczną (2005)
- Requiem na baryton solo, chór mieszany i orkiestrę (2007)

== Decorations ==
- Cross of Merit (1952)
- Order of Polonia Restituta (1954)
- Nagroda Państwowa II stopnia (1955)
- Nagroda muzyczna miasta Katowic (1957)
- Nagroda Ministra Kultury i Sztuki III stopnia w dziedzinie muzyki (1963)
- Nagroda Związku Kompozytorów Polskich (1968)
- Nagroda Państwowa I stopnia (1971)
- Order of the Banner of Work (1971)
- Złota Odznaka Za zasługi dla Warszawy (1972)
- Nagroda Państwowa I stopnia (1972)
- Polish Radio and Television Award (1979)
- Diamentowa Batuta – nagroda honorowa z okazji 70-lecia Polskiego Radia (1995)
- Nagroda Ministra Kultury i Sztuki za rok 1998, za dorobek artystyczny w dziedzinie muzyki (1999)
- Gold Medal for Merit to Culture – Gloria Artis (2005)
- Nagroda Tansman za wybitną indywidualność muzyczną (2006)
- Order Ecce Homo (2009)
- Koryfeusz Muzyki Polskiej za całokształt twórczości (2011)
- Dwukrotnie nagroda Złotego Orfeusza za wykonania na Warszawskiej Jesieni
- Doktorat honoris causa Akademii Muzycznej im. Grażyny i Kiejstuta Bacewiczów w Łodzi (2018)

Cultural offices
Preceded by Grzegorz Fitelberg	Music Director, Polish National Radio Symphony Orchestra; 1952–1968	Succeeded by Bohdan Wodiczko
