= Kazimierz Kord =

Polish conductor (1930–2021)

Kazimierz Kord directing (photo with 1978 dedication)

Kazimierz Kord (18 November 1930 – 29 April 2021) was a Polish conductor. Between 1949 and 1955, he studied piano at the Leningrad Conservatory. He also studied at the Academy of Music in Kraków.

He held major conducting positions with the Polish National Radio Symphony Orchestra, the Warsaw Philharmonic and the Southwest German Radio Symphony Orchestra. His operatic guest conducting engagements included the first performance in Russian of Tchaikovsky's The Queen of Spades at the Metropolitan Opera (Met) in the 1972–1973 season, and both Aida at the Met and Eugene Onegin at the Royal Opera House, London in 1976. His recordings include the first stereo version of Don Quichotte by Jules Massenet, with Nicolai Ghiaurov in the title role, Gabriel Bacquier as Sancho Panza, and Régine Crespin as Dulcinée.

He was Principal Guest Conductor and Music Advisor of the Pacific Symphony of Orange County, California (USA) for their 1989–1990 season.

In 2001 he received the Knight's Cross of the Polonia Restituta Order.

Cultural offices
Preceded by Jan Krenz	Music Director, Polish National Radio Symphony Orchestra; 1969–1973	Succeeded by Zygmunt Tlatlik
Preceded by Witold Rowicki	Music Director, Warsaw Philharmonic Orchestra; 1977–2001	Succeeded by Antoni Wit
Preceded by Ernest Bour	Principal Conductor, Southwest German Radio Symphony Orchestra; 1980–1986	Succeeded by Michael Gielen
