= Twenty Polish Christmas Carols =

1946 collection of Polish carols by Witold Lutosławski

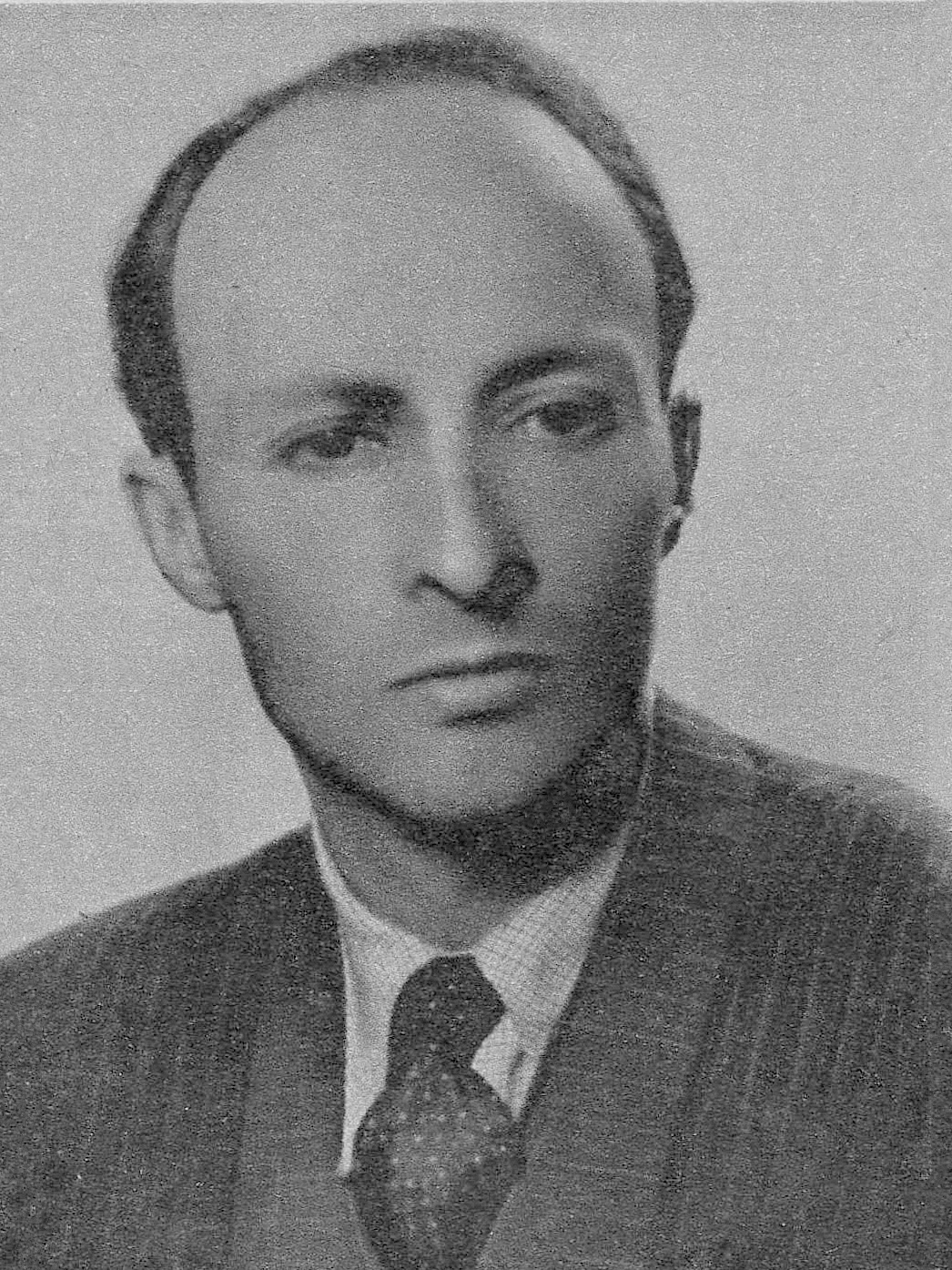
Witold Lutosławski on 16 August 1946

Twenty Polish Christmas Carols (Polish: 20 polskich kolęd) is a collection of Polish carols arranged for soprano and piano in 1946 by Polish composer Witold Lutosławski (1913–1994) and then orchestrated by him for soprano, female choir and orchestra in 1984–1989. The music and lyrics were taken mostly from 19th-century printed sources.

== History ==
Twenty Polish Christmas Carols is a composition by Witold Lutosławski. It is based on Christmas carols collected by the composer in 1946 in Poland at the request of the Director of the Polish Music Publishing.

In the years leading up to this event, occupation by Nazi Germany and The Soviet Union had had a devastating effect on Poland. The post-war years were times of daily hardship. The cultural sphere was influenced by conservative ideologies and the totalitarian authorities in place at the time. In such a climate, collecting Christmas carols was a relatively safe and harmless activity.

Arranging the collected Christmas Carols, Lutosławski first wrote for only voice and piano. Aniela Szleminska (soprano) and Jan Hoffman then performed a part of the completed work in Kraków.

The work then disappeared until almost 40 years later, when Lutoslawski re-arranged the carols for soprano, a female chorus and orchestra.

On December 15, 1985 this version was performed for the first time. Marie Slorach sang accompanied by the London Symphony Orchestra with a choir.

On December 14, 1990 the Chamber Orchestra of Scotland, with accompanying choir, played the work with soloist Susan Hamilton in Edinburgh. This version was equipped with English-language texts, while all previous versions had been performed in Polish.

Twenty Polish Christmas Carols have been likened to folk-song pieces by Ralph Vaughan Williams.

The Polish texts were drawn from books:

- Śpiewnik Kościelny - collection of Polish 19th century sacred songs by Michał Mioduszewski (1838–1853)
- Pastorałki i kolędy z melodyjami – collection of 17th to 19th century Polish sacred Christmas carols by Michał Mioduszewski (1843)
- Lud vol.16: Lubelskie by Oskar Kolberg (1883)
- Lud vol.22: Leczyckie by Oskar Kolberg (1899)

== Carols ==
No.	English title	Original title in Polish
1	Angels to the shepherd came	Anioł pasterzom mówił
2	Hey! We rejoice now	Hej, weselmy się
3	When the Christ to us is born	Gdy się Chrystus rodzi
4	Just after midnight	Północ już była
5	God is Born	Bóg się rodzi
6	Our Lovely Lady	Gdy śliczna Panna
7	Hurrying to Bethlehem	Przybieżeli do Betlejem
8	In a manger	W żłobie leży
9	Jesus there is lying	Jezus malusieńki
10	We are shepherds	My też pastuszkowie
11	Lullaby, Jesus	Lulajże Jezuniu
12	Hey, on this day	Hej, w dzień narodzenia
13	Jesus, lovely flower	Jezu, śliczny kwiecie
14	Hey la, hey la, shepherds there you are	Hola hola, pasterze z pola
15	What to do with this child?	A cóż z tą dzieciną
16	Hey, hey, lovely Lady Mary	Hej hej, lelija Panna Maryja
17	This is our Lord's birthday	Z narodzenia Pana
18	Shepherds, can you tell?	Pasterze mili
19	Infant, so tiny	Dziecina mała
20	Holy Lady Mary (wandered through the world wide)	Najświętsza Panienka po świecie chodziła

== Orchestration ==
- Soprano
- SSAA (sopranos and altos )
- 1 flute, 1 oboe / cor anglais, 2 clarinets (II also bass clarinet), 1 bassoon
- Two horns, one trumpet, one trombone
- Percussion, 1 harp, piano
- Violins, violas, cellos, double basses

== See also ==
- List of Christmas carols
