= Antoni Wit =

Polish conductor (born 1944)

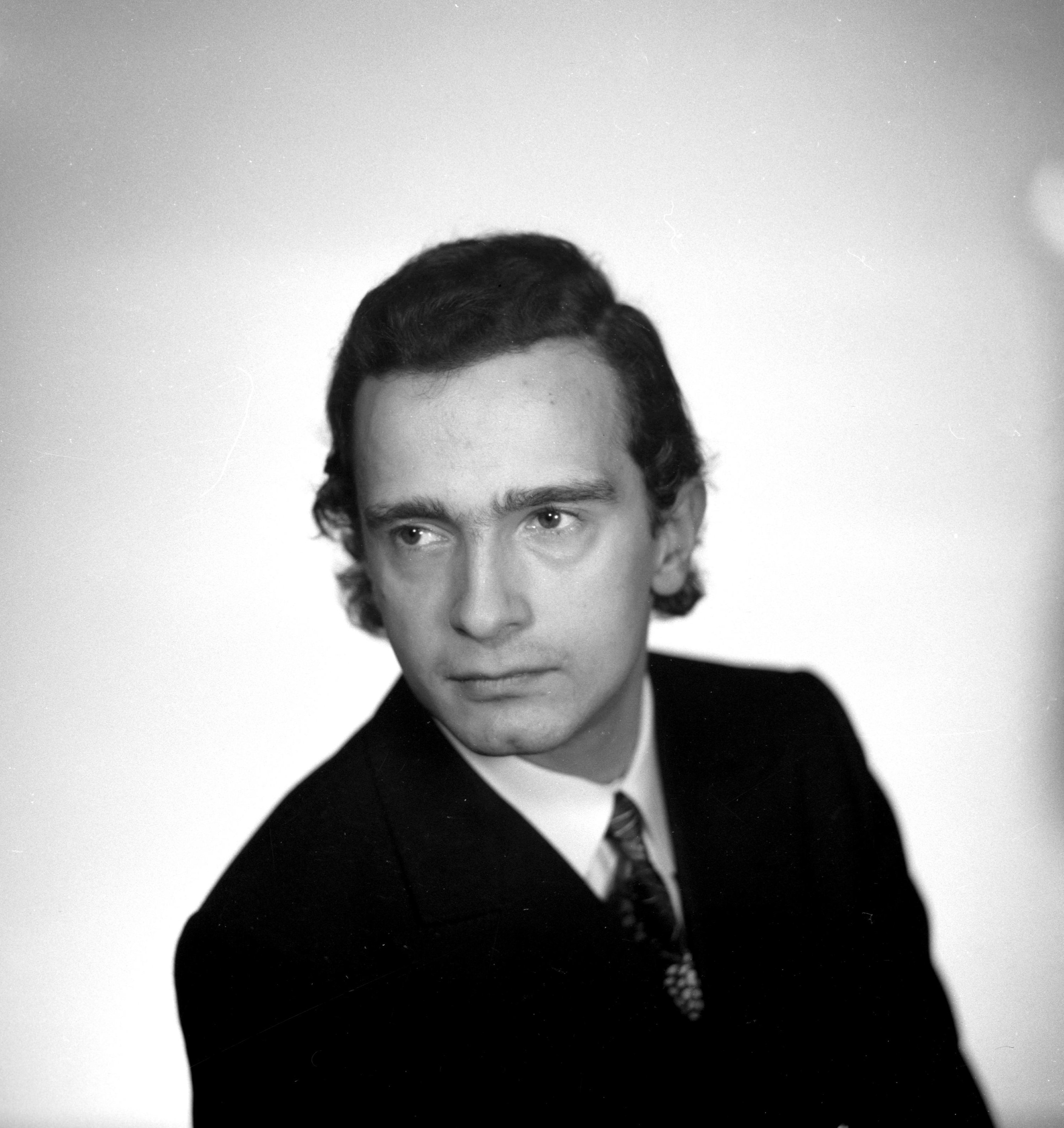
- Born: 7 February 1944; Kraków, German-occupied Poland
- Education: Academy of Music in Kraków (music); Jagiellonian University (law)
- Occupations: Conductor, composer, lawyer
- Years active: 1971–present

Antoni Wit (born 7 February 1944) is a Polish conductor, composer, lawyer and professor at the Fryderyk Chopin University of Music. Between 2002 and 2013, he served as the artistic director of the Warsaw National Philharmonic Orchestra.

== Life and career ==
Wit was born in Kraków. He graduated from the Kraków conservatory (then called Państwowa Wyższa Szkola Muzyczna) in 1967. He studied conducting under Henryk Czyż and composition under Krzysztof Penderecki. He went on to study in Paris under Nadia Boulanger (1967–68). In 1969, he also graduated in law from the Jagiellonian University in Kraków.

In the years 1974–1977, Antoni Wit was the deputy artistic director of the Pomeranian Philharmonic in Bydgoszcz and the lead conductor of the orchestra. In Bydgoszcz, he gained independence in his repertoire and the opportunity to perform the works he valued the most. In 1977, he returned to his hometown of Krakow, where he took over the management of the Polish Radio and Television Orchestra and Choir.

He has recorded over 90 albums, most of them for the Naxos label, and many of them during his tenure with the Polish National Radio Symphony Orchestra (formerly the Great Polish Radio Symphony Orchestra) in Katowice, whose managing and artistic director he was from 1983 to 2000. In the years 1987–1992 he was the conductor of the Orquesta Filarmónica de Gran Canaria in the Canary Islands. Since 1998, he has been a professor of conducting at the Fryderyk Chopin University of Music in Warsaw.

From 2002 to 2013 he was music director of the Warsaw Philharmonic Orchestra. He also collaborated with the Orquesta Sinfónica de Navarra in Pamplona from the 2010–2011 to the 2016–2017 season, serving as their first guest conductor. In May 2013 he was nominated Artistic Director of the ensemble.

He has conducted the Berlin Philharmonic, Staatskapelle Dresden, the Orchestra dell'Accademia Nazionale di Santa Cecilia in Rome, the Zürich Tonhalle Orchestra, the Kraków Philharmonic Orchestra, Sofia Philharmonic Orchestra, the Orquestra Simfònica de Barcelona i Nacional de Catalunya, and in London the BBC Symphony Orchestra, Philharmonia Orchestra, and London Philharmonic Orchestra. He specializes in the works of Polish composers such as Henryk Górecki, Wojciech Kilar, Krzysztof Meyer, Witold Lutosławski, Karol Szymanowski and Krzysztof Penderecki, whose Polish Requiem he recorded in 2004. Wit received a Cannes Classical Award for his album of Olivier Messiaen's Turangalîla Symphony; his recording of Bedřich Smetana's Má vlast cycle was also very well received.

He currently teaches at the Fryderyk Chopin Academy of Music in Warsaw.

== Selected awards and honours ==
- Grand Prix du Disque de la Nouvelle Académie, (1983)
- Knight's Cross of the Order of Polonia Restituta, (1985)
- Polish Radio's Diamond Baton Award, (1998)
- Fryderyk Award for Album of the Year - Symphonic Music, (2002)
- Cannes Classical Award, (2002)
- Gold Medal of the Artur Rubinstein Foundation, (2002)
- Fryderyk Award for Album of the Year - Symphonic Music, (2005)
- Fryderyk Award for Album of the Year - Contemporary Music, (2005)
- Order of Merit of the Italian Republic, (2006)
- Gramophone Editor's Choice, (2007)
- Gramophone Editor's Choice, (2008)
- BBC Music Magazine Editor's Choice, (2008)
- BBC Music Magazine Editor's Choice, (2009)
- Karol Szymanowski Foundation Award, (2010)
- Commander's Cross with Star of the Order of Polonia Restituta, (2011)
- Grammy Award for Best Classical Compendium, (2013)
- Knight of Legion of Honour, (2015)

== See also ==
- Music of Poland
- List of Poles

Cultural offices
Preceded by Stanisław Wisłocki	Music Director, Polish National Radio Symphony Orchestra; 1983–2000	Succeeded by Gabriel Chmura
Preceded by Kazimierz Kord	Musical directors, Warsaw Philharmonic Orchestra; 2002–2013	Succeeded by Jacek Kaspszyk
