= Witold Rowicki =

Polish conductor

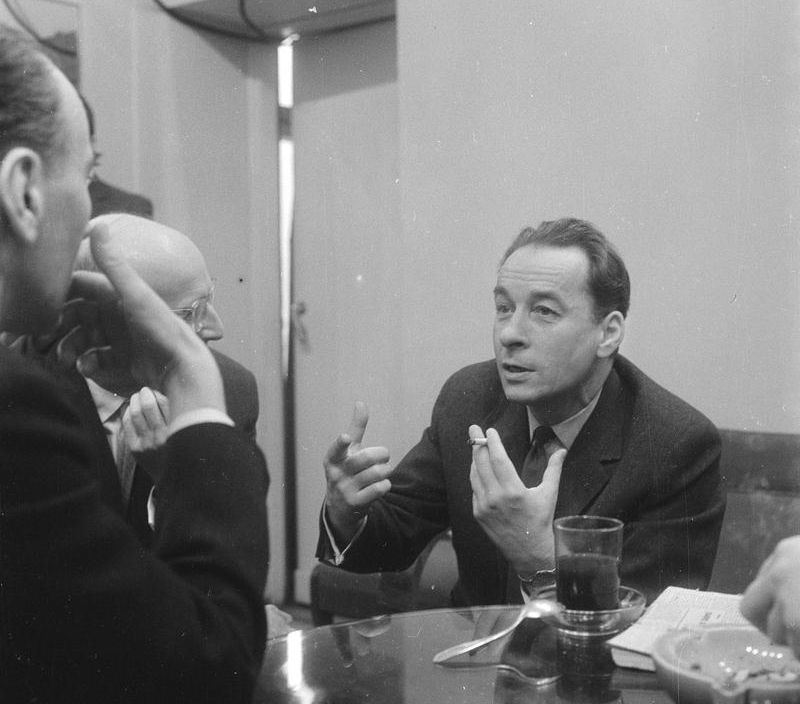
Witold Rowicki during 7th Chopin Competition, Warsaw, 1965

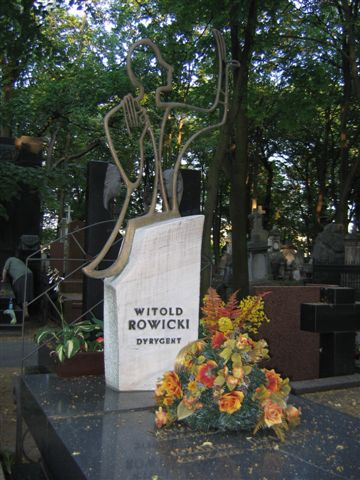
Grave of Witold Rowicki at Powązki Cemetery in Warsaw.

Witold Rowicki (born Witold Kałka, 26 February 1914 – 1 October 1989) was a Polish conductor. He held principal conducting positions with the Warsaw Philharmonic Orchestra and the Bamberg Symphony Orchestra. Witold Lutosławski's Concerto for Orchestra was dedicated to him.

== Biography ==
Rowicki was born in Taganrog, Russian Empire in 1914. He arrived in Poland in 1923, attending schools in Żywiec and Nowy Sącz before matriculating at the conservatory in Kraków. He studied violin under Artur Malawski and theory under director Michał Piotrowski and made his conducting debut, while still a student, in 1933. Graduating in 1938, he was appointed professor of violin at the conservatory and spent the occupation years in Kraków.

After the Soviet expulsion of the Nazis from Poland, Rowicki revived the defunct Polish National Radio Symphony Orchestra, which had disbanded during the war, in Katowice. Between 1950 and 1955, and again between 1958 and 1977, Rowicki was the director of the Warsaw Philharmonic, leading the orchestra on multiple foreign tours and receiving several decorations from the Polish government. He later moved to West Germany and directed the Bamberg Symphony from 1983 to 1985. He died in Warsaw in 1989.

== Discography ==
Rowicki was most strongly associated with the Warsaw Philharmonic, but he also made recordings as a guest conductor with orchestras including the London Symphony Orchestra, the Philharmonia Orchestra, and the Royal Philharmonic Orchestra (all in London), the Yomiuri Nippon Symphony Orchestra in Tokyo, and the Wiener Symphoniker. His recordings include:

- a Dvořák symphony cycle with the London Symphony Orchestra,
- works of Wojciech Kilar
- the Violin Concerto, Eternal Songs and Lithuanian Rhapsody of Mieczysław Karłowicz
- various works of Karol Szymanowski.
- Schumann, Rachmaninoff and Prokofiev piano concertos with Sviatoslav Richter; Mozart piano concertos with Ingrid Haebler and the London Symphony Orchestra

Cultural offices
Preceded by [orchestra defunct under wartime occupation]	Music Director, Polish National Radio Symphony Orchestra; 1945–1947	Succeeded by Grzegorz Fitelberg
Preceded by Władysław Raczkowski	Music Director, Warsaw Philharmonic Orchestra; 1950–1955	Succeeded by Bohdan Wodiczko
Preceded by Bohdan Wodiczko	Music Director, Warsaw Philharmonic Orchestra; 1958–1977	Succeeded by Kazimierz Kord
Preceded by James Loughran	Chief Conductor, Bamberg Symphony Orchestra; 1983–1985	Succeeded by Horst Stein
