= Polish National Radio Symphony Orchestra =

Polish symphony orchestra

Coordinates: 50°15′50″N 19°01′44″E

- Radio orchestra
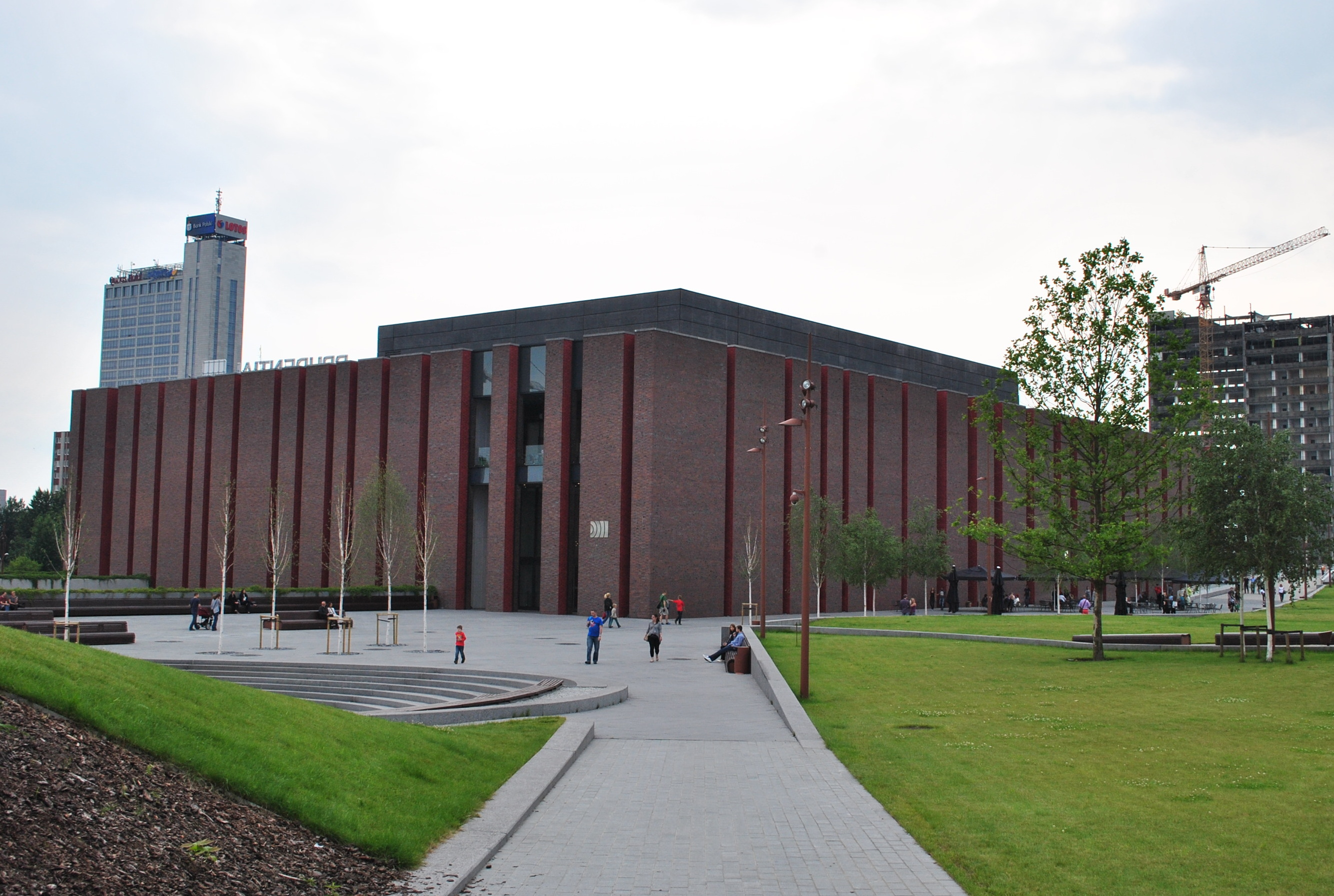
- NOSPR building
- Short name: NOSPR
- Founded: 1935/1945
- Location: Katowice, Poland
- Principal conductor: Marin Alsop
- Website: nospr.org.pl/en

The Polish National Radio Symphony Orchestra (Polish: Narodowa Orkiestra Symfoniczna Polskiego Radia (NOSPR)) is one of Poland's radio orchestras and premier musical institutions. It was founded in 1935 in Warsaw and was later re-established in Katowice in 1945. Since 2006 it has been a "National Cultural Institution".

== History ==
The symphonic orchestra was created in 1935 and led by Grzegorz Fitelberg until the outbreak of World War II. In March 1945 Witold Rowicki revived the orchestra in Katowice. In 1947, Grzegorz Fitelberg, upon his return from abroad, took over the post of the artistic director. In 2019, the orchestra also joined the European Concert Hall Organisation (ECHO), which includes European concert halls who collaborate in the interests of enhancing audiences, exploring music repertoire and stimulating music practice at all levels.

The Polish National Radio Symphony Orchestra has collaborated with many world-famous soloists and conductors including: Martha Argerich, Leonard Bernstein, Krzysztof Penderecki, Artur Rubinstein, Mstislav Rostropovich, Krystian Zimerman, Rudolf Buchbinder, James Conlon, Boris Belkin, Placido Domingo, Nicolai Gedda, Barbara Hendricks, Kevin Kenner, Wilhelm Kempff, Paweł Klecki, Kirill Kondrashin, Witold Lutosławski, Charles Mackerras, Mischa Maisky, Neville Marriner, Kurt Masur, Shlomo Mintz, Ivan Monighetti, Garrick Ohlsson, Anne-Sophie Mutter, Hermann Prey, Ruggiero Ricci, Thomas Schippers, Stanisław Skrowaczewski, Isaac Stern, Henryk Szeryng, İdil Biret, Marzena Diakun and Pieter Wispelwey. The orchestra has also collaborated with a wide range of contemporary conductors, soloists and artists. Recent and current collaborators include Marin Alsop, who became artistic director and chief conductor of NOSPR from the 2023/2024 season, Tine Thing Helseth, Yamen Saadi, Ledisi, Nayden Todorov, Adam Sztaba, Vladimir Fanshil, Paweł Kapuła, Marzena Diakun, Jakub Józef Orliński, Isabelle Faust, Giovanni Antonini, Yulianna Avdeeva and Andrzej Boreyko.

=== Musical directors ===
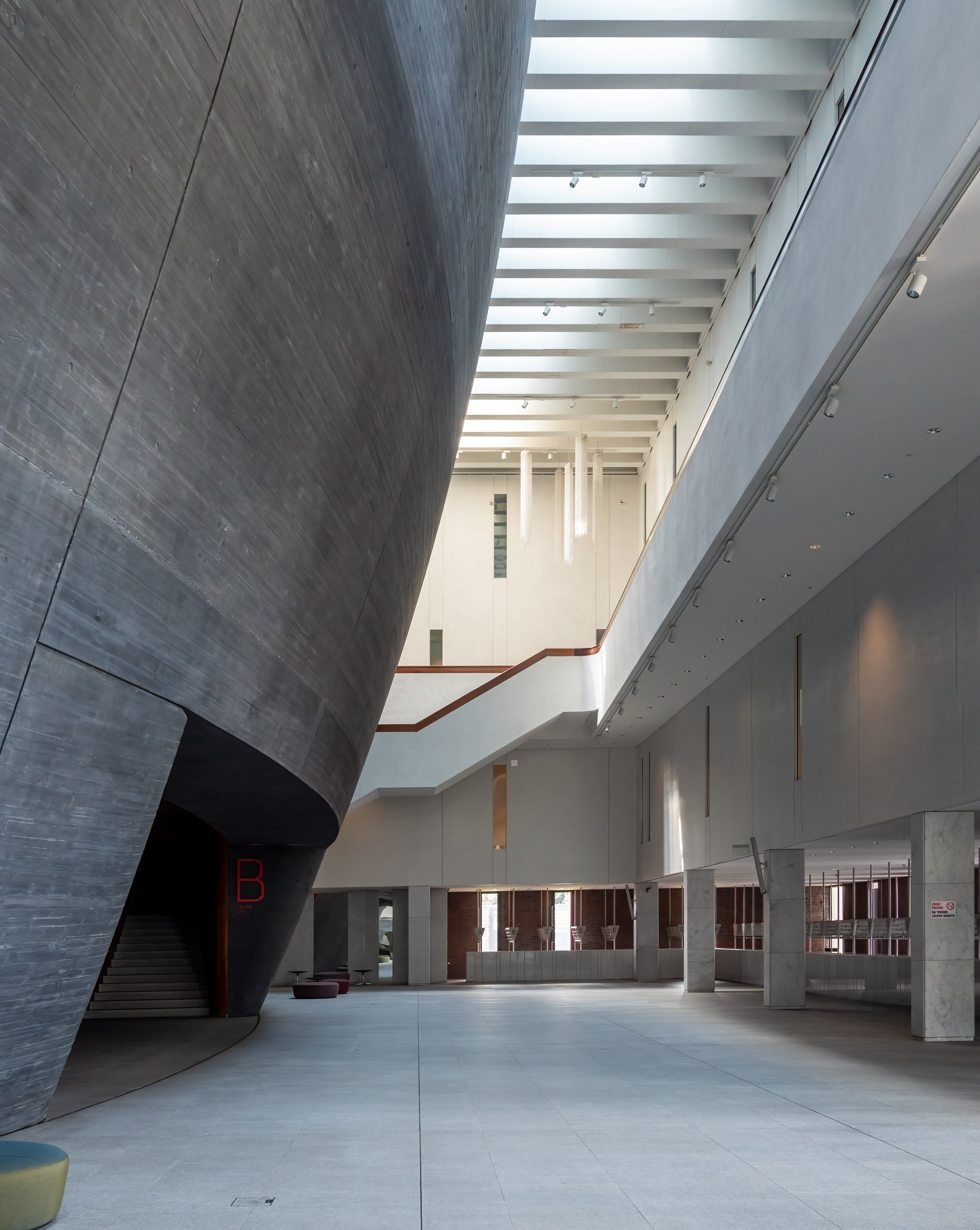
NOSPR lobby

- Grzegorz Fitelberg (1935–1939)
- Witold Rowicki (1946–1947)
- Grzegorz Fitelberg (returning, 1947–1953)
- Jan Krenz (1953–1968)
- Bohdan Wodiczko (1968–1969)
- Kazimierz Kord (1969–1973)
- Zygmunt Tlatlik (1973–?)
- Tadeusz Strugała (1975–1976)
- Jerzy Maksymiuk (1976–1977)
- Stanisław Wisłocki (1978–1981)
- Jacek Kaspszyk (1981–?)
- Antoni Wit (1983–2000)
- Gabriel Chmura (2001–2007)
- Jacek Kaspszyk (returning, 2009–2012)
- Alexander Liebreich (2012–2019)
- Lawrence Foster (2019-2023)
- Marin Alsop (2023–present)

In September 2000, Joanna Wnuk-Nazarowa was appointed the general and programme director. From 2012 to August 2019 Alexander Liebreich was Chief Conductor and Artistic Director of the NOSPR.

In September 2018, Ewa Bogusz-Moore took up the post of General and Programme Director of the NOSPR. From September

== Recordings ==
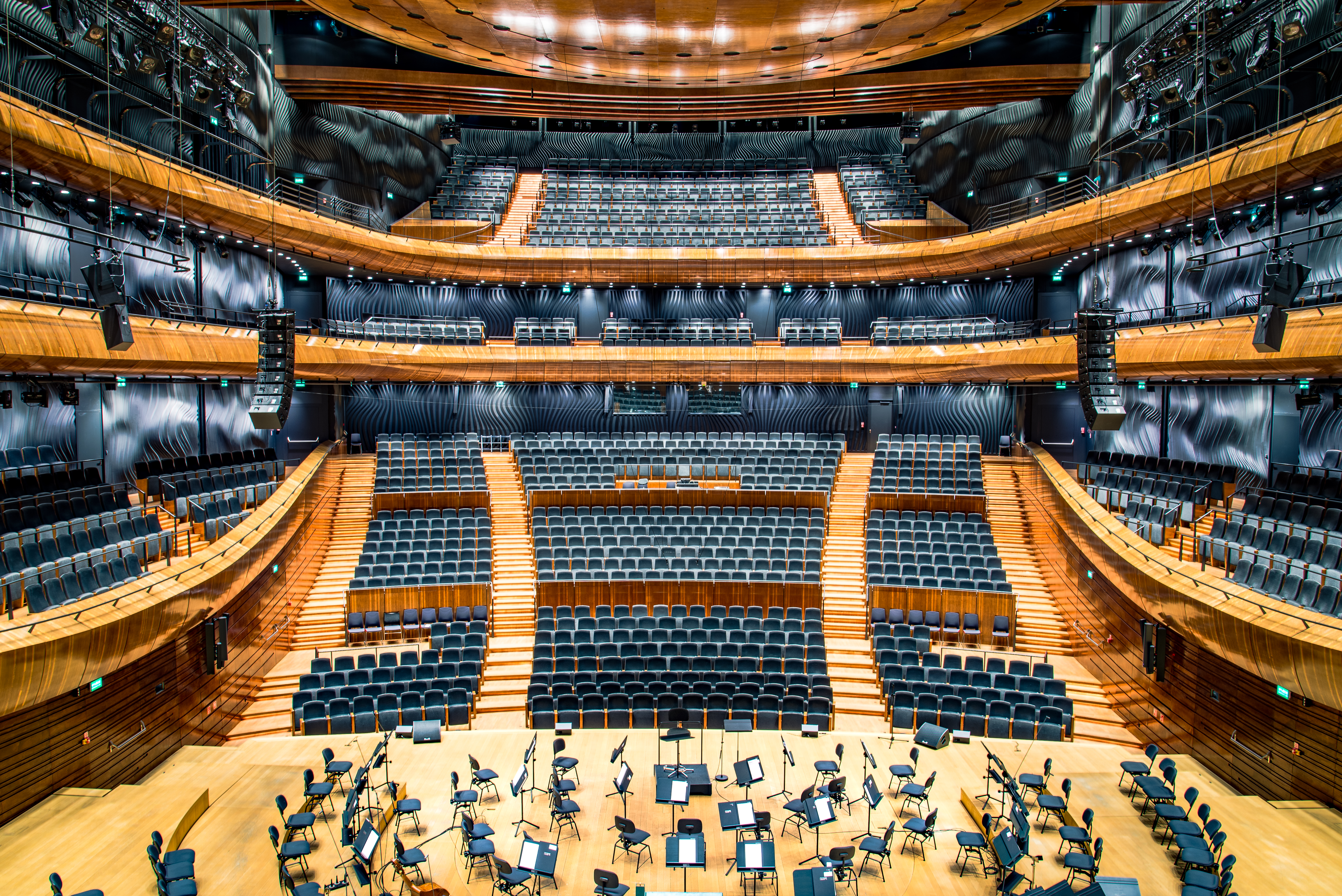
NOSPR's concert hall

The orchestra has recorded more than 200 vinyl and compact discs for many Polish and foreign labels: Eterna, WERGO, Angel, Polskie Nagrania Muza, Decca, EMI, Philips, etc. It additionally made numerous archival recordings for the needs of Polish Radio. For the Naxos label they recorded among others complete works of Witold Lutosławski (9 CDs), all symphonies of Tchaikowsky, Schumann, most of Penderecki's (I-V), Mahler's (except for VIII), as well as works of Wojciech Kilar, Henryk Wieniawski, Maurice Moszkowski and Henryk Górecki and for Chandos Records they made a three record album with music of Mieczysław Weinberg. Recorded by PNRSO K. Penderecki's Credo, H. M. Górecki's Symphony No. 3 and W. Kilar's Missa pro pace were released on DVD and SACD by Polish Radio as The Sacred Triptych.

For phonographic achievements the orchestra was honoured with numerous prizes: among others, Karol Szymanowski: Stabat Mater was chosen Record of the Year by the Gramophone magazine in 1985, five piano concertos by Prokofiev under direction of Antoni Wit with the soloist Kun Woo Paik were awarded the Diapason d'Or and the Grand Prix du Disque de la Nouvelle Académie du Disque 1992 and the recording of Turangalila Symphony by Olivier Messiaen under Antoni Wit (with François Weigel on piano) was awarded the 2002 Cannes Classical Award. In 2002, 2004 and 2007, the orchestra won the Fryderyk Awards for Album of the Year - Archival Recording for Polish Conductors: Jan Krenz, Polish Conductors: Grzegorz Fitelberg and Polish Conductors: Henryk Czyż respectively.

A record for Dux with works of Krzysztof Penderecki (Capriccio for violin and orchestra, De natura sonoris no. 2 for the piano and orchestra, Resurrection) with participation of NOSPR as well as soloists Beata Bilińska and Patrycja Piekutowska conducted by the composer received prestigious MIDEM Classical Award 2008 in the category of Contemporary Music. In 2017, the orchestra received the ICMA Award in the best collection category for Szymanowski: Overture op. 12, Lutoslawski: Cello Concerto, Symphony No. 4 while in 2018, the orchestra also received the ICMA Special Achievement Award.

== New seat of the orchestra ==
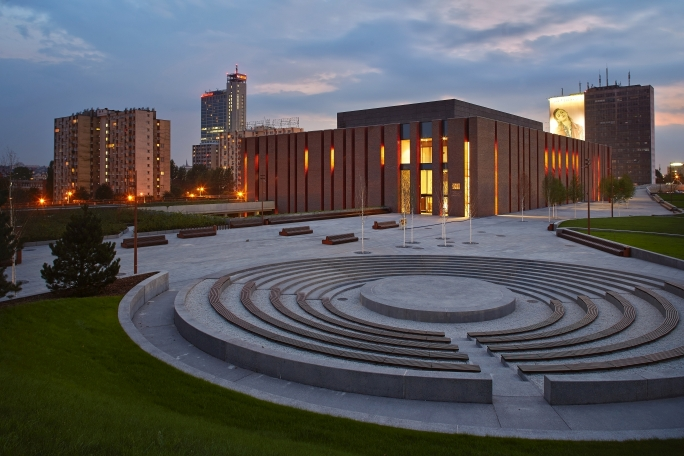
NOSPR at dusk

The construction of the building started in 2012 and was completed in 2014. The Polish National Radio Symphony Orchestra in Katowice has been operating in the new building located at Wojciech Kilar Square since 1 October 2014. The cost of the project is estimated at 305 million zlotys (ca. US$80 million) and contains a main concert hall with a seating capacity of 1800 and a smaller one for 300 concert-goers. It is among the largest and most modern music venues in Poland and the world. In 2014, around 154,219 music lovers attended concerts in the newly built seat of the orchestra.

The venue is situated in the post-industrial area of Katowice formerly belonging to KWK Katowice coal mine. The building was designed by Polish architect Tomasz Konior and his team, while the acoustics of the concert hall were designed by world-renowned Japanese acoustician Yasuhisa Toyota who works for Nagata Acoustics Company. Since April 2019, NOSPR has been a member of European Concert Hall Organisation (ECHO), an organisation of Europe’s best concert halls.

== See also ==
- Warsaw Philharmonic
- Sinfonia Varsovia
- National Forum of Music
- Szczecin Philharmonic
- Henryk Górecki: Symphony No. 3 (Symphony of Sorrowful Songs)
