= Zygmunt Latoszewski =

Polish conductor, theater director and music teacher

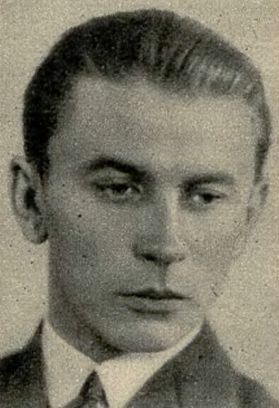

Zygmunt Latoszewski (1902 in Poznań – 1995 in Warsaw) was a Polish conductor, theatrical director, and music teacher. He was a conductor and director of many of opera and philharmonic performances in Poland.
