= Bohdan Wodiczko =

Polish conductor and music teacher

Bohdan Wodiczko (2 July 1911, in Warsaw – 12 May 1985, in Warsaw) was a Polish conductor and music teacher.

== Early life and education ==
Born July 1, 1911 in Warsaw, Wodiczko first studied violin at the Warsaw Frederick Chopin Music School and then piano, French horn and theory at the Warsaw Conservatory from 1929. In 1932, he went to Prague for a further training under Jaroslav Křička (composition) and Metod Doležil (conducting) and to attend Václav Talich's special conducting course. Upon his return to Poland three years later, he continued composition studies under Piotr Rytel, he was conducting under Walerian Bierdiajew at the Warsaw Conservatory from 1936-1939, and graduated with honours.

== Career ==
During World War II, Wodiczko earned money by playing in the orchestra of the Warsaw Adria night club. After the war he organized the police symphony orchestra in Otwock near Warsaw and was its conductor for a while; he also taught conducting at the Karol Kurpiński Music School in Warsaw. He then moved to Gdańsk where he became the first conductor of the Filharmonia Bałtycka (1946–1950), starting from 1947 he would also lecture at the National Higher School of Music in Sopot. From 1947 to 1949, he was also the music director of the Polish Radio in Gdańsk. In 1950, he was appointed artistic manager and first conductor of the National Philharmonic in Łódź and joined the faculty of the Łódź National Higher Music School. From 1951, he worked on counterpart positions at the National Philharmonic in Kraków, and as a lecturer at Kraków's National Higher Music School from 1953. As the artistic manager and first conductor of the National Philharmonic in Warsaw in 1955-1958, he took its orchestra on its first grand tour in UK, Belgium and West Germany; he concurrently lectured conducting at the National Higher Music Schools in Warsaw and Poznań and, from 1959, also in Łódź, where he was also the acting conductor of the National Operetta.

The years 1961-1965 saw him produce a number of performances at the Warsaw Opera in his capacity as artistic director and first conductor. The premiere of Igor Stravinsky's Oedipus Rex (staged by Konrad Swinarski) in January 1962 was followed by Igor Stravinsky's Persephone, Orpheus and The Rite of Spring, Giuseppe Verdi's Don Carlos, Stanislaw Moniuszko's The Haunted Manor, Richard Strauss's The Knight of the Rose, Bela Bartok's Bluebeard's Castle, Luigi Dallapiccoli's Il prigionero and Luigi Nono's Il mantello rosso. During his appointment as conductor of the Icelandic Symphony Orchestra in Reykjavík, 1965 to 1968, Wodiczko conducted works by Stanisław Moniuszko, Frederic Chopin and Mieczysław Karłowicz, and was instrumental in the production of a complete radio broadcast of Stanislaw Moniuszko's opera Halka.

In 1968 he returned to Poland and took the position of conductor of the Polish National Radio Symphony Orchestra - WOSPR [later NOSPR].

=== Later years ===
A professor at the National Higher Music School in Warsaw in 1972-1978, he was appointed director and artistic manager of the Teatr Wielki in Łódź in August 1977 and was the artistic manager, though not the director any more, from April to June 1979. In the last years of his life, when he seldom stood at the conductor's podium, he made the Helsinki recording of Claude Debussy's Iberia and of Karol Szymanowski's Harnasie (with the Polish Radio Great Symphony Orchestra).

Wodiczko received the Order of the Falcon from the President of Iceland in 1968 and the award of the Polish Composers' Union in 1975.

== Personal life ==
He was the father of the Polish-American artist Krzysztof Wodiczko.

== Footnotes ==
1. Douglas Crimp; Rosalyn Deutsche; Ewa Lajer-Burcharth; Krzysztof Wodiczko (Autumn 1986). "A Conversation with Krzysztof Wodiczko". October. 38: 36. doi:10.2307/778426. JSTOR 778426.

Cultural offices
Preceded by Witold Rowicki	Music directors, Warsaw Philharmonic Orchestra; 1955–1958	Succeeded by Witold Rowicki
