= Connected =

Connected may refer to:

== Film and television ==
- Connected (2008 film), a Hong Kong remake of the American movie Cellular
- Connected: An Autoblogography About Love, Death & Technology, a 2011 documentary film
- Connected (2015 TV series), an AOL On documentary web series
- Connected (2020 TV series), a Netflix documentary series
- Sportsnet Connected, a sports news program that airs in Canada
- The Mitchells vs. the Machines, a 2021 American animated comedy film previously named Connected
- Connected (2022 film), first film produced by Star Magic Studios

== Music ==
=== Albums ===
- Connected (Eivind Aarset album), 2004
- Connected (The Foreign Exchange album), 2004
- Connected (Lil' Flip and Mr. Capone-E album), 2006
- Connected (Stereo MCs album), 1992

=== Songs ===
- "Connected" (Ayumi Hamasaki song), 2003
- "Connected" (Hoobastank song), 2004
- "Connected" (RBD song), 2006
- "Connected" (Stereo MCs song), 1992
- "Connected (Yours Forever)" a song by Hydelic and Kathleen for the 2018 video game, Tetris Effect

== Other uses ==
- Connected space, a mathematical concept in topology
  - Path-connected space
  - Simply connected space
- Connected ring, a concept from commutative algebra
- ConnectEd, a plan to provide high-speed Internet service to nearly all United States schools
- Connected (website), The Arts Society (UK) platform to support isolated people during coronavirus pandemic

== See also ==
- Connect (disambiguation)
- Connectivity (disambiguation)
- Connection (disambiguation)
- Connexion (disambiguation)
- Reconnected (disambiguation)
