= Reconnect =

Reconnect may refer to:

== Music ==
- Reconnect (Iris album), a remix album released by American band Iris in 2003
- "Reconnect" (song), the 2006 debut single of Director, an Irish art rock quartet
- "Reconnect", by Destrophy from their self-titled album, 2009
- "Reconnect", by Aura Dione, from the album Before the Dinosaurs, 2012
- "Reconnect", by Knife Party from the album Abandon Ship, 2014
- "Reconnect", by illuminatus from the album Glasnost, 2011
- "Reconnect", a single by PARIS, 2018
- "[re]connect", by Veil of Maya from the album [m]other, 2023

== Other uses ==
- Operation Reconnect, an international protest to increase awareness of the Church of Scientology's disconnection policy
- Reconnect, a product label by Reliance Digital
- ReConnect Program, a Rural Utilities Service program to expand broadband Internet access to rural areas of the United States

== See also ==
- Connect (disambiguation)
- Reconnected (disambiguation)
- Reconnection
