= List of minor planets: 524001–525000 =

The following is a partial list of minor planets, running from minor-planet number 524001 through 525000, inclusive. The primary data for this and other partial lists is based on JPL's "Small-Body Orbital Elements" and data available from the Minor Planet Center. Critical list information is also provided by the MPC, unless otherwise specified from Lowell Observatory. A detailed description of the table's columns and additional sources are given on the main page including a complete list of every page in this series, and a statistical break-up on the dynamical classification of minor planets.

Also see the summary list of all named bodies in numerical and alphabetical order, and the corresponding naming citations for the number range of this particular list. New namings may only be added to this list after official publication, as the preannouncement of names is condemned by the Working Group for Small Bodies Nomenclature of the International Astronomical Union.

Near-Earth obj.	MBA (inner)	MBA (outer)	Centaur
Mars-crosser	MBA (middle)	Jupiter trojan	Trans-Neptunian obj.
Unclassified

== 524001–524100 ==
Designation			Discovery			Properties		Ref
Permanent	Provisional	Named after	Date	Site	Discoverer(s)	Category	Diam.	Ref
524001	1999 TG_{307}	—	October 3, 1999	Kitt Peak	Spacewatch	·	3.0 km	MPC · JPL
524002	1999 TX_{313}	—	October 9, 1999	Socorro	LINEAR	·	1.0 km	MPC · JPL
524003	1999 TX_{318}	—	October 12, 1999	Kitt Peak	Spacewatch	·	1.3 km	MPC · JPL
524004	1999 TZ_{334}	—	October 13, 1999	Kitt Peak	Spacewatch	·	1.8 km	MPC · JPL
524005	1999 TP_{336}	—	October 11, 1999	Kitt Peak	Spacewatch	EUN	1.3 km	MPC · JPL
524006	1999 UA_{23}	—	October 31, 1999	Kitt Peak	Spacewatch	EUN	1.2 km	MPC · JPL
524007	1999 UT_{44}	—	October 30, 1999	Catalina	CSS	H	530 m	MPC · JPL
524008	1999 UP_{46}	—	October 3, 1999	Socorro	LINEAR	·	1.5 km	MPC · JPL
524009	1999 UU_{53}	—	October 19, 1999	Kitt Peak	Spacewatch	·	1.2 km	MPC · JPL
524010	1999 UU_{59}	—	October 31, 1999	Kitt Peak	Spacewatch	·	740 m	MPC · JPL
524011	1999 VG_{41}	—	November 1, 1999	Kitt Peak	Spacewatch	·	1.2 km	MPC · JPL
524012	1999 VH_{85}	—	November 6, 1999	Kitt Peak	Spacewatch	·	2.6 km	MPC · JPL
524013	1999 VZ_{118}	—	November 3, 1999	Kitt Peak	Spacewatch	·	1.5 km	MPC · JPL
524014	1999 VT_{119}	—	November 3, 1999	Kitt Peak	Spacewatch	·	2.4 km	MPC · JPL
524015	1999 VD_{126}	—	November 9, 1999	Kitt Peak	Spacewatch	V	610 m	MPC · JPL
524016	1999 VN_{128}	—	October 29, 1999	Kitt Peak	Spacewatch	·	1.6 km	MPC · JPL
524017	1999 VS_{149}	—	November 14, 1999	Socorro	LINEAR	·	1.3 km	MPC · JPL
524018	1999 VW_{182}	—	November 9, 1999	Socorro	LINEAR	·	640 m	MPC · JPL
524019	1999 VG_{208}	—	November 1, 1999	Kitt Peak	Spacewatch	VER	2.3 km	MPC · JPL
524020	1999 VG_{214}	—	October 21, 2008	Kitt Peak	Spacewatch	·	1.2 km	MPC · JPL
524021	1999 WK_{15}	—	February 25, 2006	Mount Lemmon	Mount Lemmon Survey	AST	1.6 km	MPC · JPL
524022	1999 WV_{20}	—	November 16, 1999	Kitt Peak	Spacewatch	·	1.6 km	MPC · JPL
524023	1999 WH_{23}	—	November 17, 1999	Kitt Peak	Spacewatch	·	870 m	MPC · JPL
524024	1999 WO_{27}	—	November 28, 1999	Kitt Peak	Spacewatch	·	1.1 km	MPC · JPL
524025	1999 XT_{54}	—	December 7, 1999	Socorro	LINEAR	·	1.3 km	MPC · JPL
524026	1999 XF_{138}	—	December 2, 1999	Kitt Peak	Spacewatch	·	2.0 km	MPC · JPL
524027	1999 XF_{224}	—	December 13, 1999	Kitt Peak	Spacewatch	·	650 m	MPC · JPL
524028	1999 XM_{232}	—	October 8, 2008	Kitt Peak	Spacewatch	HOF	1.9 km	MPC · JPL
524029	1999 XJ_{253}	—	December 12, 1999	Kitt Peak	Spacewatch	·	800 m	MPC · JPL
524030	1999 XS_{253}	—	December 12, 1999	Kitt Peak	Spacewatch	·	1.2 km	MPC · JPL
524031	1999 XJ_{258}	—	December 4, 1999	Kitt Peak	Spacewatch	·	3.2 km	MPC · JPL
524032	1999 YQ_{25}	—	December 27, 1999	Kitt Peak	Spacewatch	·	2.1 km	MPC · JPL
524033	2000 AN_{145}	—	January 6, 2000	Socorro	LINEAR	·	1.4 km	MPC · JPL
524034	2000 AV_{164}	—	May 22, 2006	Kitt Peak	Spacewatch	HOF	2.4 km	MPC · JPL
524035	2000 AM_{211}	—	January 5, 2000	Kitt Peak	Spacewatch	·	1.1 km	MPC · JPL
524036	2000 AS_{225}	—	January 12, 2000	Kitt Peak	Spacewatch	·	2.3 km	MPC · JPL
524037	2000 AA_{234}	—	December 27, 1999	Kitt Peak	Spacewatch	·	2.2 km	MPC · JPL
524038	2000 AS_{257}	—	December 27, 1999	Kitt Peak	Spacewatch	AGN	1.2 km	MPC · JPL
524039	2000 AA_{258}	—	September 6, 2003	Campo Imperatore	CINEOS	DOR	2.1 km	MPC · JPL
524040	2000 BK_{20}	—	January 26, 2000	Kitt Peak	Spacewatch	·	680 m	MPC · JPL
524041	2000 BJ_{43}	—	January 28, 2000	Kitt Peak	Spacewatch	·	940 m	MPC · JPL
524042	2000 BX_{44}	—	January 28, 2000	Kitt Peak	Spacewatch	·	2.4 km	MPC · JPL
524043	2000 BE_{47}	—	January 30, 2000	Kitt Peak	Spacewatch	·	920 m	MPC · JPL
524044	2000 CP_{69}	—	February 1, 2000	Kitt Peak	Spacewatch	KOR	1.2 km	MPC · JPL
524045	2000 CF_{74}	—	February 7, 2000	Kitt Peak	Spacewatch	·	1.5 km	MPC · JPL
524046	2000 CR_{78}	—	February 8, 2000	Kitt Peak	Spacewatch	·	1.9 km	MPC · JPL
524047	2000 CF_{96}	—	February 11, 2000	Kitt Peak	Spacewatch	·	1.6 km	MPC · JPL
524048	2000 CC_{98}	—	February 7, 2000	Kitt Peak	Spacewatch	·	2.5 km	MPC · JPL
524049	2000 CQ_{105}	—	February 5, 2000	Kitt Peak	M. W. Buie	SDO	220 km	MPC · JPL
524050	2000 CQ_{106}	—	April 11, 1996	Kitt Peak	Spacewatch	·	1.6 km	MPC · JPL
524051	2000 CR_{126}	—	February 1, 2000	Kitt Peak	Spacewatch	·	780 m	MPC · JPL
524052	2000 CR_{127}	—	February 2, 2000	Kitt Peak	Spacewatch	·	990 m	MPC · JPL
524053	2000 CK_{143}	—	February 4, 2000	Kitt Peak	Spacewatch	T_{j} (2.96)	3.7 km	MPC · JPL
524054	2000 DV_{16}	—	February 29, 2000	Socorro	LINEAR	H	560 m	MPC · JPL
524055	2000 DX_{67}	—	February 29, 2000	Socorro	LINEAR	·	2.6 km	MPC · JPL
524056	2000 DD_{89}	—	February 26, 2000	Kitt Peak	Spacewatch	HOF	2.6 km	MPC · JPL
524057	2000 EK_{5}	—	March 2, 2000	Kitt Peak	Spacewatch	HOF	2.5 km	MPC · JPL
524058	2000 EV_{22}	—	February 11, 2000	Kitt Peak	Spacewatch	·	920 m	MPC · JPL
524059	2000 EM_{55}	—	March 11, 2000	Prescott	P. G. Comba	·	810 m	MPC · JPL
524060	2000 EP_{67}	—	March 10, 2000	Socorro	LINEAR	·	1.1 km	MPC · JPL
524061	2000 EK_{72}	—	March 10, 2000	Kitt Peak	Spacewatch	·	1.5 km	MPC · JPL
524062	2000 EG_{102}	—	March 14, 2000	Kitt Peak	Spacewatch	EOS	1.6 km	MPC · JPL
524063	2000 EG_{161}	—	March 3, 2000	Socorro	LINEAR	·	1.4 km	MPC · JPL
524064	2000 EQ_{163}	—	March 3, 2000	Socorro	LINEAR	·	2.2 km	MPC · JPL
524065	2000 EM_{205}	—	October 16, 2002	Palomar	NEAT	MAS	810 m	MPC · JPL
524066	2000 EO_{208}	—	January 12, 2010	Kitt Peak	Spacewatch	·	2.0 km	MPC · JPL
524067	2000 EQ_{208}	—	March 3, 2000	Kitt Peak	Spacewatch	KOR	1.4 km	MPC · JPL
524068	2000 FA_{67}	—	March 25, 2000	Kitt Peak	Spacewatch	·	1.2 km	MPC · JPL
524069	2000 FV_{68}	—	March 27, 2000	Kitt Peak	Spacewatch	EOS	1.8 km	MPC · JPL
524070	2000 FQ_{70}	—	March 29, 2000	Kitt Peak	Spacewatch	·	990 m	MPC · JPL
524071	2000 GY_{21}	—	April 5, 2000	Socorro	LINEAR	·	2.7 km	MPC · JPL
524072	2000 GS_{34}	—	September 12, 1994	Kitt Peak	Spacewatch	·	940 m	MPC · JPL
524073	2000 GM_{64}	—	April 5, 2000	Socorro	LINEAR	NYS	1.2 km	MPC · JPL
524074	2000 GA_{121}	—	April 5, 2000	Kitt Peak	Spacewatch	·	2.6 km	MPC · JPL
524075	2000 GT_{129}	—	March 27, 2000	Kitt Peak	Spacewatch	NYS	1.1 km	MPC · JPL
524076	2000 GB_{145}	—	April 7, 2000	Kitt Peak	Spacewatch	THM	2.3 km	MPC · JPL
524077	2000 GW_{149}	—	April 5, 2000	Socorro	LINEAR	·	1.4 km	MPC · JPL
524078	2000 GD_{151}	—	March 25, 2000	Kitt Peak	Spacewatch	·	730 m	MPC · JPL
524079	2000 GL_{175}	—	April 1, 2000	Kitt Peak	Spacewatch	·	2.1 km	MPC · JPL
524080	2000 GP_{176}	—	April 2, 2000	Kitt Peak	Spacewatch	LIX	4.2 km	MPC · JPL
524081	2000 GK_{182}	—	April 2, 2000	Kitt Peak	Spacewatch	EOS	1.9 km	MPC · JPL
524082	2000 HA_{1}	—	April 24, 2000	Kitt Peak	Spacewatch	BRG	1.4 km	MPC · JPL
524083	2000 HC_{1}	—	April 24, 2000	Kitt Peak	Spacewatch	·	2.1 km	MPC · JPL
524084	2000 HU_{91}	—	April 30, 2000	Kitt Peak	Spacewatch	·	2.5 km	MPC · JPL
524085	2000 HC_{93}	—	April 29, 2000	Socorro	LINEAR	·	1.3 km	MPC · JPL
524086	2000 JM_{94}	—	December 30, 2008	Kitt Peak	Spacewatch	·	2.4 km	MPC · JPL
524087	2000 KE_{5}	—	May 28, 2000	Socorro	LINEAR	PHO	1.0 km	MPC · JPL
524088	2000 KW_{35}	—	May 27, 2000	Socorro	LINEAR	·	1.7 km	MPC · JPL
524089	2000 KV_{38}	—	May 24, 2000	Kitt Peak	Spacewatch	EOS	2.0 km	MPC · JPL
524090	2000 KW_{71}	—	May 28, 2000	Kitt Peak	Spacewatch	·	690 m	MPC · JPL
524091	2000 NW_{28}	—	July 2, 2000	Kitt Peak	Spacewatch	·	2.1 km	MPC · JPL
524092	2000 OL_{2}	—	July 28, 2000	Prescott	P. G. Comba	EOS	2.1 km	MPC · JPL
524093	2000 PF_{4}	—	August 1, 2000	Socorro	LINEAR	·	1.2 km	MPC · JPL
524094	2000 QP_{25}	—	August 26, 2000	Socorro	LINEAR	·	2.1 km	MPC · JPL
524095	2000 QP_{30}	—	August 25, 2000	Socorro	LINEAR	·	940 m	MPC · JPL
524096	2000 QB_{34}	—	August 24, 2000	Socorro	LINEAR	·	1.3 km	MPC · JPL
524097	2000 QR_{34}	—	August 26, 2000	Socorro	LINEAR	·	1.6 km	MPC · JPL
524098	2000 QV_{38}	—	August 24, 2000	Socorro	LINEAR	·	710 m	MPC · JPL
524099	2000 QJ_{56}	—	August 26, 2000	Socorro	LINEAR	·	650 m	MPC · JPL
524100	2000 QA_{108}	—	August 29, 2000	Socorro	LINEAR	(5)	1.1 km	MPC · JPL

== 524101–524200 ==
back to top

Designation			Discovery			Properties		Ref
Permanent	Provisional	Named after	Date	Site	Discoverer(s)	Category	Diam.	Ref
524101	2000 QL_{147}	—	August 24, 2000	Socorro	LINEAR	PHO	1.0 km	MPC · JPL
524102	2000 QA_{148}	—	August 31, 2000	Socorro	LINEAR	·	1.6 km	MPC · JPL
524103	2000 QG_{166}	—	August 31, 2000	Socorro	LINEAR	·	1.8 km	MPC · JPL
524104	2000 QO_{172}	—	August 31, 2000	Socorro	LINEAR	·	2.0 km	MPC · JPL
524105	2000 QX_{179}	—	August 30, 2000	Kitt Peak	Spacewatch	·	3.0 km	MPC · JPL
524106	2000 QN_{221}	—	August 26, 2000	Socorro	LINEAR	·	1.6 km	MPC · JPL
524107	2000 QF_{225}	—	August 29, 2000	Socorro	LINEAR	·	770 m	MPC · JPL
524108	2000 QQ_{243}	—	August 20, 2000	Kitt Peak	Spacewatch	·	1.2 km	MPC · JPL
524109	2000 QT_{250}	—	August 24, 2000	Socorro	LINEAR	·	930 m	MPC · JPL
524110	2000 RO_{36}	—	September 2, 2000	Prescott	P. G. Comba	·	1.1 km	MPC · JPL
524111	2000 RE_{58}	—	September 7, 2000	Kitt Peak	Spacewatch	·	2.9 km	MPC · JPL
524112	2000 RS_{77}	—	September 9, 2000	Ondřejov	L. Kotková	·	1.1 km	MPC · JPL
524113	2000 RX_{107}	—	September 3, 2000	Apache Point	SDSS	·	860 m	MPC · JPL
524114	2000 SB_{1}	—	September 18, 2000	Socorro	LINEAR	T_{j} (2.81) · CYB	5.6 km	MPC · JPL
524115	2000 SY_{9}	—	September 23, 2000	Socorro	LINEAR	·	920 m	MPC · JPL
524116	2000 SF_{21}	—	September 23, 2000	Socorro	LINEAR	·	1.6 km	MPC · JPL
524117	2000 SV_{23}	—	September 23, 2000	Socorro	LINEAR	·	1.8 km	MPC · JPL
524118	2000 SW_{23}	—	September 23, 2000	Socorro	LINEAR	PHO	1.3 km	MPC · JPL
524119	2000 SD_{54}	—	September 24, 2000	Socorro	LINEAR	EOS	2.3 km	MPC · JPL
524120	2000 SR_{94}	—	September 1, 2000	Socorro	LINEAR	·	950 m	MPC · JPL
524121	2000 SN_{97}	—	September 23, 2000	Socorro	LINEAR	·	1.1 km	MPC · JPL
524122	2000 SR_{100}	—	September 23, 2000	Socorro	LINEAR	·	1.4 km	MPC · JPL
524123	2000 SB_{131}	—	September 22, 2000	Socorro	LINEAR	·	1.6 km	MPC · JPL
524124	2000 SC_{131}	—	September 22, 2000	Socorro	LINEAR	·	1.9 km	MPC · JPL
524125	2000 SE_{135}	—	September 23, 2000	Socorro	LINEAR	·	1.7 km	MPC · JPL
524126	2000 SO_{185}	—	September 21, 2000	Socorro	LINEAR	·	1.5 km	MPC · JPL
524127	2000 SD_{189}	—	September 24, 2000	Socorro	LINEAR	·	1.4 km	MPC · JPL
524128	2000 SC_{195}	—	September 24, 2000	Socorro	LINEAR	·	1.1 km	MPC · JPL
524129	2000 SB_{236}	—	September 24, 2000	Socorro	LINEAR	·	1.7 km	MPC · JPL
524130	2000 SZ_{326}	—	September 29, 2000	Kitt Peak	Spacewatch	·	1.5 km	MPC · JPL
524131	2000 SU_{341}	—	September 24, 2000	Kitt Peak	Spacewatch	·	1.7 km	MPC · JPL
524132	2000 SA_{342}	—	September 24, 2000	Kitt Peak	Spacewatch	·	1.7 km	MPC · JPL
524133	2000 SV_{345}	—	September 20, 2000	Kitt Peak	M. W. Buie	·	600 m	MPC · JPL
524134	2000 SV_{355}	—	October 1, 2000	Socorro	LINEAR	·	1.7 km	MPC · JPL
524135	2000 SU_{360}	—	September 24, 2000	Socorro	LINEAR	·	980 m	MPC · JPL
524136	2000 SD_{372}	—	September 28, 2000	Socorro	LINEAR	·	900 m	MPC · JPL
524137	2000 TB_{12}	—	October 1, 2000	Socorro	LINEAR	·	1.4 km	MPC · JPL
524138	2000 TX_{29}	—	October 4, 2000	Socorro	LINEAR	·	2.0 km	MPC · JPL
524139	2000 TY_{30}	—	October 3, 2000	Kitt Peak	Spacewatch	·	1.3 km	MPC · JPL
524140	2000 TB_{31}	—	October 4, 2000	Kitt Peak	Spacewatch	·	2.7 km	MPC · JPL
524141	2000 UL_{1}	—	October 18, 2000	Kitt Peak	Spacewatch	·	1.7 km	MPC · JPL
524142	2000 UY_{11}	—	October 25, 2000	Kitt Peak	Spacewatch	·	810 m	MPC · JPL
524143	2000 UD_{16}	—	October 3, 2000	Socorro	LINEAR	·	1.7 km	MPC · JPL
524144	2000 UC_{96}	—	October 25, 2000	Socorro	LINEAR	·	2.1 km	MPC · JPL
524145	2000 VE_{3}	—	November 1, 2000	Socorro	LINEAR	·	1.6 km	MPC · JPL
524146	2000 VV_{11}	—	November 1, 2000	Socorro	LINEAR	(5)	1.6 km	MPC · JPL
524147	2000 VO_{58}	—	November 5, 2000	Kitt Peak	Spacewatch	VER	3.1 km	MPC · JPL
524148	2000 WE_{3}	—	November 19, 2000	Socorro	LINEAR	H	600 m	MPC · JPL
524149	2000 WE_{5}	—	November 19, 2000	Socorro	LINEAR	·	1.6 km	MPC · JPL
524150	2000 WJ_{10}	—	November 19, 2000	Anderson Mesa	LONEOS	AMO	260 m	MPC · JPL
524151	2000 WV_{34}	—	November 20, 2000	Socorro	LINEAR	·	1.9 km	MPC · JPL
524152	2000 WQ_{51}	—	November 27, 2000	Kitt Peak	Spacewatch	·	1.5 km	MPC · JPL
524153	2000 WR_{63}	—	October 7, 2000	Anderson Mesa	LONEOS	·	890 m	MPC · JPL
524154	2000 WW_{63}	—	November 24, 2000	Kitt Peak	Spacewatch	·	1.3 km	MPC · JPL
524155	2000 WA_{64}	—	November 24, 2000	Kitt Peak	Spacewatch	·	3.0 km	MPC · JPL
524156	2000 WB_{64}	—	November 24, 2000	Kitt Peak	Spacewatch	·	1.2 km	MPC · JPL
524157	2000 WE_{64}	—	November 25, 2000	Kitt Peak	Spacewatch	·	2.4 km	MPC · JPL
524158	2000 WV_{65}	—	November 28, 2000	Kitt Peak	Spacewatch	·	870 m	MPC · JPL
524159	2000 WM_{105}	—	November 27, 2000	Kitt Peak	Spacewatch	H	570 m	MPC · JPL
524160	2000 WM_{149}	—	November 28, 2000	Kitt Peak	Spacewatch	·	1.1 km	MPC · JPL
524161	2000 WK_{166}	—	November 2, 2000	Kitt Peak	Spacewatch	·	2.9 km	MPC · JPL
524162	2000 WB_{185}	—	November 29, 2000	Kitt Peak	Spacewatch	·	1.8 km	MPC · JPL
524163	2000 XH	—	December 1, 2000	Kitt Peak	Spacewatch	V	390 m	MPC · JPL
524164	2000 YU_{3}	—	December 18, 2000	Kitt Peak	Spacewatch	·	2.4 km	MPC · JPL
524165	2000 YC_{9}	—	December 21, 2000	Kitt Peak	Spacewatch	·	1.9 km	MPC · JPL
524166	2000 YN_{23}	—	December 28, 2000	Kitt Peak	Spacewatch	·	670 m	MPC · JPL
524167	2000 YR_{37}	—	November 27, 2000	Socorro	LINEAR	CYB	2.9 km	MPC · JPL
524168	2000 YK_{140}	—	October 3, 2003	Kitt Peak	Spacewatch	V	890 m	MPC · JPL
524169	2001 AN_{1}	—	January 2, 2001	Kitt Peak	Spacewatch	·	1.7 km	MPC · JPL
524170	2001 BO_{37}	—	January 21, 2001	Socorro	LINEAR	·	1.7 km	MPC · JPL
524171	2001 BR_{81}	—	January 20, 2001	Kitt Peak	Spacewatch	·	1.1 km	MPC · JPL
524172	2001 DQ_{42}	—	February 13, 2001	Kitt Peak	Spacewatch	·	1.7 km	MPC · JPL
524173	2001 DG_{64}	—	February 19, 2001	Socorro	LINEAR	PHO	840 m	MPC · JPL
524174	2001 DJ_{72}	—	February 19, 2001	Socorro	LINEAR	·	4.1 km	MPC · JPL
524175	2001 DJ_{90}	—	February 22, 2001	Kitt Peak	Spacewatch	·	1.7 km	MPC · JPL
524176	2001 FW_{31}	—	March 22, 2001	Kitt Peak	Spacewatch	·	670 m	MPC · JPL
524177	2001 FD_{84}	—	March 26, 2001	Kitt Peak	Spacewatch	·	920 m	MPC · JPL
524178	2001 FJ_{85}	—	March 26, 2001	Kitt Peak	Spacewatch	·	1.1 km	MPC · JPL
524179	2001 FQ_{185}	—	March 26, 2001	Kitt Peak	M. W. Buie	twotino	157 km	MPC · JPL
524180	2001 FT_{193}	—	March 19, 2001	Anderson Mesa	LONEOS	·	2.5 km	MPC · JPL
524181	2001 FY_{196}	—	March 4, 2013	Haleakala	Pan-STARRS 1	·	2.5 km	MPC · JPL
524182	2001 HF_{7}	—	April 18, 2001	Kitt Peak	Spacewatch	·	2.4 km	MPC · JPL
524183	2001 HN_{24}	—	April 27, 2001	Kitt Peak	Spacewatch	·	1.7 km	MPC · JPL
524184	2001 HU_{68}	—	May 15, 2005	Mount Lemmon	Mount Lemmon Survey	MAS	860 m	MPC · JPL
524185	2001 KF_{18}	—	May 22, 2001	Anderson Mesa	LONEOS	·	1.3 km	MPC · JPL
524186	2001 KA_{55}	—	May 26, 2001	Kitt Peak	Spacewatch	·	2.8 km	MPC · JPL
524187	2001 OJ_{78}	—	July 26, 2001	Palomar	NEAT	·	540 m	MPC · JPL
524188	2001 PU_{58}	—	August 14, 2001	Haleakala	NEAT	·	630 m	MPC · JPL
524189	2001 PH_{67}	—	August 1, 2001	Palomar	NEAT	·	660 m	MPC · JPL
524190	2001 QB_{52}	—	August 16, 2001	Socorro	LINEAR	·	880 m	MPC · JPL
524191	2001 QJ_{72}	—	August 21, 2001	Kitt Peak	Spacewatch	·	1.3 km	MPC · JPL
524192	2001 QW_{130}	—	August 20, 2001	Socorro	LINEAR	·	1.5 km	MPC · JPL
524193	2001 QQ_{145}	—	August 24, 2001	Kitt Peak	Spacewatch	3:2 · SHU	5.5 km	MPC · JPL
524194	2001 QV_{151}	—	July 19, 2001	Palomar	NEAT	·	1.3 km	MPC · JPL
524195	2001 QU_{158}	—	August 16, 2001	Socorro	LINEAR	·	1.3 km	MPC · JPL
524196	2001 QP_{181}	—	August 31, 2001	Palomar	NEAT	AMO	640 m	MPC · JPL
524197	2001 QZ_{212}	—	August 23, 2001	Anderson Mesa	LONEOS	·	1.2 km	MPC · JPL
524198	2001 QC_{333}	—	August 19, 2001	Socorro	LINEAR	·	560 m	MPC · JPL
524199	2001 RM_{14}	—	September 10, 2001	Socorro	LINEAR	·	780 m	MPC · JPL
524200	2001 RF_{20}	—	August 16, 2001	Socorro	LINEAR	(5)	1.2 km	MPC · JPL

== 524201–524300 ==
back to top

Designation			Discovery			Properties		Ref
Permanent	Provisional	Named after	Date	Site	Discoverer(s)	Category	Diam.	Ref
524201	2001 RH_{33}	—	July 21, 2001	Kitt Peak	Spacewatch	·	560 m	MPC · JPL
524202	2001 RV_{40}	—	September 11, 2001	Socorro	LINEAR	·	1.3 km	MPC · JPL
524203	2001 RA_{42}	—	September 11, 2001	Socorro	LINEAR	T_{j} (2.9)	1.3 km	MPC · JPL
524204	2001 RD_{47}	—	September 12, 2001	Socorro	LINEAR	·	1.4 km	MPC · JPL
524205	2001 RN_{57}	—	September 12, 2001	Socorro	LINEAR	(5)	1.3 km	MPC · JPL
524206	2001 RD_{60}	—	September 12, 2001	Socorro	LINEAR	·	1.2 km	MPC · JPL
524207	2001 RP_{82}	—	September 11, 2001	Anderson Mesa	LONEOS	·	840 m	MPC · JPL
524208	2001 RL_{97}	—	September 12, 2001	Kitt Peak	Spacewatch	·	630 m	MPC · JPL
524209	2001 RH_{99}	—	September 12, 2001	Socorro	LINEAR	(5)	1.1 km	MPC · JPL
524210	2001 RH_{105}	—	August 25, 2001	Socorro	LINEAR	·	2.5 km	MPC · JPL
524211	2001 RA_{115}	—	September 12, 2001	Socorro	LINEAR	(5)	920 m	MPC · JPL
524212	2001 RO_{115}	—	August 25, 2001	Anderson Mesa	LONEOS	ADE	2.2 km	MPC · JPL
524213	2001 RZ_{123}	—	September 12, 2001	Socorro	LINEAR	·	2.4 km	MPC · JPL
524214	2001 RP_{124}	—	August 24, 2001	Socorro	LINEAR	(883)	710 m	MPC · JPL
524215	2001 RQ_{135}	—	September 12, 2001	Socorro	LINEAR	·	1.2 km	MPC · JPL
524216	2001 RU_{143}	—	September 12, 2001	Kitt Peak	M. W. Buie	plutino	270 km	MPC · JPL
524217	2001 RZ_{143}	—	September 12, 2001	Kitt Peak	M. W. Buie	cubewano (cold) · moon	108 km	MPC · JPL
524218	2001 SN_{13}	—	September 16, 2001	Socorro	LINEAR	·	500 m	MPC · JPL
524219	2001 SZ_{86}	—	September 20, 2001	Socorro	LINEAR	·	1.0 km	MPC · JPL
524220	2001 SL_{87}	—	August 23, 2001	Anderson Mesa	LONEOS	·	1.2 km	MPC · JPL
524221	2001 ST_{97}	—	September 11, 2001	Anderson Mesa	LONEOS	EUN	1.1 km	MPC · JPL
524222	2001 SJ_{114}	—	September 20, 2001	Desert Eagle	W. K. Y. Yeung	·	1.2 km	MPC · JPL
524223	2001 SR_{147}	—	September 17, 2001	Socorro	LINEAR	EUN	1.0 km	MPC · JPL
524224	2001 SH_{174}	—	September 16, 2001	Socorro	LINEAR	·	1.0 km	MPC · JPL
524225	2001 SW_{186}	—	September 19, 2001	Socorro	LINEAR	BRA	1.7 km	MPC · JPL
524226	2001 SX_{187}	—	August 24, 2001	Kitt Peak	Spacewatch	·	620 m	MPC · JPL
524227	2001 SP_{190}	—	August 27, 2001	Kitt Peak	Spacewatch	·	600 m	MPC · JPL
524228	2001 ST_{193}	—	August 25, 2001	Kitt Peak	Spacewatch	·	1.8 km	MPC · JPL
524229	2001 SH_{196}	—	September 19, 2001	Socorro	LINEAR	·	1.7 km	MPC · JPL
524230	2001 SC_{204}	—	September 19, 2001	Socorro	LINEAR	·	490 m	MPC · JPL
524231	2001 SG_{204}	—	September 19, 2001	Socorro	LINEAR	MAR	910 m	MPC · JPL
524232	2001 SQ_{206}	—	September 19, 2001	Socorro	LINEAR	·	580 m	MPC · JPL
524233	2001 SL_{210}	—	September 19, 2001	Socorro	LINEAR	·	580 m	MPC · JPL
524234	2001 SZ_{211}	—	September 19, 2001	Socorro	LINEAR	·	2.5 km	MPC · JPL
524235	2001 SU_{212}	—	September 19, 2001	Socorro	LINEAR	TIR	2.8 km	MPC · JPL
524236	2001 ST_{216}	—	September 19, 2001	Socorro	LINEAR	HOF	2.4 km	MPC · JPL
524237	2001 SE_{217}	—	September 19, 2001	Socorro	LINEAR	·	1.2 km	MPC · JPL
524238	2001 SQ_{217}	—	September 12, 2001	Socorro	LINEAR	·	1.8 km	MPC · JPL
524239	2001 SS_{224}	—	September 19, 2001	Socorro	LINEAR	·	1.2 km	MPC · JPL
524240	2001 SP_{232}	—	September 19, 2001	Socorro	LINEAR	THB	2.5 km	MPC · JPL
524241	2001 ST_{242}	—	September 19, 2001	Socorro	LINEAR	·	1.2 km	MPC · JPL
524242	2001 SJ_{258}	—	September 20, 2001	Socorro	LINEAR	TIR	2.8 km	MPC · JPL
524243	2001 SV_{273}	—	September 19, 2001	Kitt Peak	Spacewatch	·	1.4 km	MPC · JPL
524244	2001 SX_{292}	—	September 16, 2001	Socorro	LINEAR	(5)	1.1 km	MPC · JPL
524245	2001 SF_{300}	—	September 19, 2001	Kitt Peak	Spacewatch	·	650 m	MPC · JPL
524246	2001 SM_{300}	—	September 20, 2001	Socorro	LINEAR	·	2.5 km	MPC · JPL
524247	2001 SO_{304}	—	September 20, 2001	Socorro	LINEAR	·	1.1 km	MPC · JPL
524248	2001 SH_{305}	—	September 20, 2001	Socorro	LINEAR	THB	1.8 km	MPC · JPL
524249	2001 SU_{306}	—	September 12, 2001	Kitt Peak	Spacewatch	EUP	3.2 km	MPC · JPL
524250	2001 SP_{317}	—	September 19, 2001	Socorro	LINEAR	·	1.3 km	MPC · JPL
524251	2001 SC_{320}	—	September 21, 2001	Socorro	LINEAR	·	1.1 km	MPC · JPL
524252	2001 SQ_{320}	—	September 11, 2001	Kitt Peak	Spacewatch	NYS	1.0 km	MPC · JPL
524253	2001 SG_{331}	—	August 25, 2001	Kitt Peak	Spacewatch	·	3.2 km	MPC · JPL
524254	2001 SE_{332}	—	September 19, 2001	Kitt Peak	Spacewatch	EUN	880 m	MPC · JPL
524255	2001 SN_{336}	—	September 20, 2001	Socorro	LINEAR	H	460 m	MPC · JPL
524256	2001 SR_{336}	—	August 25, 2001	Kitt Peak	Spacewatch	·	2.6 km	MPC · JPL
524257	2001 SH_{337}	—	September 20, 2001	Socorro	LINEAR	·	2.5 km	MPC · JPL
524258	2001 SK_{338}	—	September 20, 2001	Socorro	LINEAR	·	520 m	MPC · JPL
524259	2001 SV_{343}	—	September 22, 2001	Kitt Peak	Spacewatch	EUN	930 m	MPC · JPL
524260	2001 SQ_{348}	—	September 27, 2001	Socorro	LINEAR	·	1.4 km	MPC · JPL
524261	2001 SX_{352}	—	September 29, 2005	Kitt Peak	Spacewatch	·	1.3 km	MPC · JPL
524262	2001 SL_{354}	—	August 27, 2001	Kitt Peak	Spacewatch	·	2.1 km	MPC · JPL
524263	2001 TZ_{2}	—	October 7, 2001	Palomar	NEAT	(5)	1.1 km	MPC · JPL
524264	2001 TA_{5}	—	September 12, 2001	Socorro	LINEAR	·	1.1 km	MPC · JPL
524265	2001 TF_{25}	—	September 20, 2001	Socorro	LINEAR	·	880 m	MPC · JPL
524266	2001 TN_{26}	—	October 14, 2001	Socorro	LINEAR	·	1.0 km	MPC · JPL
524267	2001 TE_{30}	—	October 14, 2001	Socorro	LINEAR	·	530 m	MPC · JPL
524268	2001 TO_{48}	—	October 15, 2001	Socorro	LINEAR	APO	370 m	MPC · JPL
524269	2001 TN_{50}	—	October 13, 2001	Socorro	LINEAR	·	1.3 km	MPC · JPL
524270	2001 TE_{56}	—	October 15, 2001	Socorro	LINEAR	EUN	1.1 km	MPC · JPL
524271	2001 TA_{58}	—	October 13, 2001	Socorro	LINEAR	·	1.2 km	MPC · JPL
524272	2001 TP_{81}	—	September 11, 2001	Anderson Mesa	LONEOS	·	1.4 km	MPC · JPL
524273	2001 TC_{87}	—	October 14, 2001	Socorro	LINEAR	·	1.0 km	MPC · JPL
524274	2001 TX_{95}	—	October 14, 2001	Socorro	LINEAR	·	2.6 km	MPC · JPL
524275	2001 TR_{128}	—	October 14, 2001	Kitt Peak	Spacewatch	·	3.7 km	MPC · JPL
524276	2001 TA_{129}	—	September 22, 2001	Kitt Peak	Spacewatch	·	1.9 km	MPC · JPL
524277	2001 TH_{153}	—	October 11, 2001	Palomar	NEAT	(5)	1.1 km	MPC · JPL
524278	2001 TG_{156}	—	September 12, 2001	Kitt Peak	Spacewatch	·	1.3 km	MPC · JPL
524279	2001 TQ_{173}	—	September 21, 2001	Socorro	LINEAR	·	2.6 km	MPC · JPL
524280	2001 TA_{176}	—	October 14, 2001	Socorro	LINEAR	(5)	1.1 km	MPC · JPL
524281	2001 TB_{177}	—	October 14, 2001	Socorro	LINEAR	·	660 m	MPC · JPL
524282	2001 TB_{180}	—	October 14, 2001	Socorro	LINEAR	(5)	1 km	MPC · JPL
524283	2001 TR_{186}	—	October 14, 2001	Socorro	LINEAR	·	2.9 km	MPC · JPL
524284	2001 TK_{188}	—	October 14, 2001	Socorro	LINEAR	·	1.5 km	MPC · JPL
524285	2001 TJ_{205}	—	October 11, 2001	Socorro	LINEAR	·	2.6 km	MPC · JPL
524286	2001 TQ_{209}	—	October 14, 2001	Socorro	LINEAR	H	470 m	MPC · JPL
524287	2001 TO_{231}	—	September 20, 2001	Kitt Peak	Spacewatch	·	770 m	MPC · JPL
524288	2001 TA_{242}	—	October 14, 2001	Cima Ekar	ADAS	(5)	1.3 km	MPC · JPL
524289	2001 TW_{244}	—	October 14, 2001	Apache Point	SDSS	·	1.8 km	MPC · JPL
524290	2001 TQ_{254}	—	October 14, 2001	Apache Point	SDSS	·	530 m	MPC · JPL
524291	2001 TS_{263}	—	October 3, 2013	Haleakala	Pan-STARRS 1	L5	6.8 km	MPC · JPL
524292	2001 UQ_{19}	—	September 21, 2001	Socorro	LINEAR	·	1.0 km	MPC · JPL
524293	2001 UR_{25}	—	October 18, 2001	Socorro	LINEAR	·	1.0 km	MPC · JPL
524294	2001 UZ_{39}	—	September 16, 2001	Socorro	LINEAR	·	1.4 km	MPC · JPL
524295	2001 UL_{45}	—	October 17, 2001	Socorro	LINEAR	(5)	1.4 km	MPC · JPL
524296	2001 UF_{71}	—	October 17, 2001	Kitt Peak	Spacewatch	·	640 m	MPC · JPL
524297	2001 UT_{74}	—	October 17, 2001	Socorro	LINEAR	·	1.1 km	MPC · JPL
524298	2001 UV_{95}	—	October 16, 2001	Socorro	LINEAR	·	1.6 km	MPC · JPL
524299	2001 UC_{110}	—	September 20, 2001	Socorro	LINEAR	LIX	3.1 km	MPC · JPL
524300	2001 UW_{128}	—	September 16, 2001	Socorro	LINEAR	·	1.0 km	MPC · JPL

== 524301–524400 ==
back to top

Designation			Discovery			Properties		Ref
Permanent	Provisional	Named after	Date	Site	Discoverer(s)	Category	Diam.	Ref
524301	2001 US_{135}	—	October 22, 2001	Socorro	LINEAR	·	480 m	MPC · JPL
524302	2001 UW_{136}	—	September 25, 2001	Socorro	LINEAR	JUN	900 m	MPC · JPL
524303	2001 UG_{138}	—	October 23, 2001	Socorro	LINEAR	·	2.6 km	MPC · JPL
524304	2001 UG_{163}	—	October 23, 2001	Socorro	LINEAR	·	610 m	MPC · JPL
524305	2001 UG_{184}	—	October 16, 2001	Kitt Peak	Spacewatch	EOS	1.9 km	MPC · JPL
524306	2001 UV_{188}	—	October 17, 2001	Kitt Peak	Spacewatch	·	1.2 km	MPC · JPL
524307	2001 UH_{220}	—	October 21, 2001	Socorro	LINEAR	·	3.3 km	MPC · JPL
524308	2001 UK_{229}	—	October 21, 2001	Palomar	NEAT	BRG	1.3 km	MPC · JPL
524309	2001 VF_{4}	—	November 7, 2001	Socorro	LINEAR	·	1.6 km	MPC · JPL
524310	2001 VN_{8}	—	November 9, 2001	Socorro	LINEAR	·	1.4 km	MPC · JPL
524311	2001 VZ_{21}	—	November 9, 2001	Socorro	LINEAR	·	1.7 km	MPC · JPL
524312	2001 VV_{39}	—	November 9, 2001	Socorro	LINEAR	T_{j} (2.99)	3.1 km	MPC · JPL
524313	2001 VT_{51}	—	October 18, 2001	Socorro	LINEAR	THB	3.3 km	MPC · JPL
524314	2001 VL_{57}	—	November 10, 2001	Socorro	LINEAR	·	970 m	MPC · JPL
524315	2001 VF_{61}	—	November 10, 2001	Socorro	LINEAR	THB	2.4 km	MPC · JPL
524316	2001 VG_{73}	—	October 17, 2001	Kitt Peak	Spacewatch	·	2.6 km	MPC · JPL
524317	2001 VP_{74}	—	November 14, 2001	Kitt Peak	Spacewatch	·	590 m	MPC · JPL
524318	2001 VC_{83}	—	October 14, 2001	Socorro	LINEAR	·	1.3 km	MPC · JPL
524319	2001 VA_{86}	—	November 12, 2001	Socorro	LINEAR	·	1.4 km	MPC · JPL
524320	2001 VS_{102}	—	November 12, 2001	Socorro	LINEAR	·	1.1 km	MPC · JPL
524321	2001 VB_{103}	—	November 12, 2001	Socorro	LINEAR	·	900 m	MPC · JPL
524322	2001 VD_{107}	—	November 12, 2001	Socorro	LINEAR	·	750 m	MPC · JPL
524323	2001 WP	—	November 16, 2001	Kitt Peak	Spacewatch	·	3.3 km	MPC · JPL
524324	2001 WY_{4}	—	November 20, 2001	Socorro	LINEAR	H	450 m	MPC · JPL
524325	2001 WD_{9}	—	November 17, 2001	Socorro	LINEAR	·	1.4 km	MPC · JPL
524326	2001 WD_{31}	—	October 19, 2001	Kitt Peak	Spacewatch	·	2.5 km	MPC · JPL
524327	2001 WP_{36}	—	September 17, 2001	Socorro	LINEAR	·	1.4 km	MPC · JPL
524328	2001 WC_{37}	—	November 17, 2001	Socorro	LINEAR	T_{j} (2.98)	2.8 km	MPC · JPL
524329	2001 WF_{45}	—	November 19, 2001	Socorro	LINEAR	MAR	1.3 km	MPC · JPL
524330	2001 WE_{52}	—	October 18, 2001	Kitt Peak	Spacewatch	·	2.5 km	MPC · JPL
524331	2001 WF_{62}	—	November 19, 2001	Socorro	LINEAR	EUN	1.1 km	MPC · JPL
524332	2001 WF_{71}	—	November 20, 2001	Socorro	LINEAR	·	3.1 km	MPC · JPL
524333	2001 WV_{73}	—	November 20, 2001	Socorro	LINEAR	·	1.4 km	MPC · JPL
524334	2001 WN_{80}	—	November 20, 2001	Socorro	LINEAR	·	1.5 km	MPC · JPL
524335	2001 WQ_{81}	—	November 20, 2001	Socorro	LINEAR	·	1.5 km	MPC · JPL
524336	2001 WB_{98}	—	November 19, 2001	Anderson Mesa	LONEOS	·	1.1 km	MPC · JPL
524337	2001 WR_{99}	—	November 19, 2001	Socorro	LINEAR	T_{j} (2.96)	2.9 km	MPC · JPL
524338	2001 WM_{104}	—	November 20, 2001	Socorro	LINEAR	·	4.6 km	MPC · JPL
524339	2001 XN_{1}	—	December 8, 2001	Socorro	LINEAR	·	1.6 km	MPC · JPL
524340	2001 XZ_{1}	—	December 8, 2001	Socorro	LINEAR	·	2.1 km	MPC · JPL
524341	2001 XH_{2}	—	December 8, 2001	Socorro	LINEAR	T_{j} (2.97)	3.3 km	MPC · JPL
524342	2001 XN_{4}	—	December 10, 2001	Socorro	LINEAR	BAR	1.5 km	MPC · JPL
524343	2001 XC_{6}	—	December 7, 2001	Socorro	LINEAR	(1547)	1.3 km	MPC · JPL
524344	2001 XQ_{8}	—	December 9, 2001	Socorro	LINEAR	TIR	2.7 km	MPC · JPL
524345	2001 XR_{32}	—	December 10, 2001	Kitt Peak	Spacewatch	·	820 m	MPC · JPL
524346	2001 XO_{38}	—	December 9, 2001	Socorro	LINEAR	HNS	1.3 km	MPC · JPL
524347	2001 XZ_{41}	—	December 9, 2001	Socorro	LINEAR	T_{j} (2.98)	3.9 km	MPC · JPL
524348	2001 XF_{73}	—	December 8, 2001	Anderson Mesa	LONEOS	·	1.1 km	MPC · JPL
524349	2001 XS_{75}	—	October 17, 2001	Socorro	LINEAR	·	3.5 km	MPC · JPL
524350	2001 XS_{83}	—	December 11, 2001	Socorro	LINEAR	·	850 m	MPC · JPL
524351	2001 XD_{91}	—	December 10, 2001	Socorro	LINEAR	·	2.9 km	MPC · JPL
524352	2001 XN_{113}	—	December 11, 2001	Socorro	LINEAR	·	1.8 km	MPC · JPL
524353	2001 XJ_{120}	—	October 23, 2001	Anderson Mesa	LONEOS	T_{j} (2.95)	4.0 km	MPC · JPL
524354	2001 XE_{129}	—	December 14, 2001	Socorro	LINEAR	·	1.2 km	MPC · JPL
524355	2001 XZ_{130}	—	August 21, 2001	Kitt Peak	Spacewatch	·	870 m	MPC · JPL
524356	2001 XB_{137}	—	November 19, 2001	Socorro	LINEAR	EUP	3.7 km	MPC · JPL
524357	2001 XL_{138}	—	December 14, 2001	Socorro	LINEAR	·	1.6 km	MPC · JPL
524358	2001 XX_{138}	—	November 20, 2001	Socorro	LINEAR	·	2.2 km	MPC · JPL
524359	2001 XL_{160}	—	December 14, 2001	Socorro	LINEAR	·	1.8 km	MPC · JPL
524360	2001 XT_{162}	—	December 14, 2001	Socorro	LINEAR	·	860 m	MPC · JPL
524361	2001 XJ_{170}	—	December 14, 2001	Socorro	LINEAR	MAS	830 m	MPC · JPL
524362	2001 XE_{174}	—	December 14, 2001	Socorro	LINEAR	·	1.4 km	MPC · JPL
524363	2001 XX_{201}	—	December 14, 2001	Kitt Peak	Spacewatch	·	1.3 km	MPC · JPL
524364	2001 XY_{221}	—	November 16, 2001	Kitt Peak	Spacewatch	·	710 m	MPC · JPL
524365	2001 XQ_{254}	—	December 10, 2001	Mauna Kea	D. C. Jewitt, S. S. Sheppard, Kleyna, J.	res · 2:5	100 km	MPC · JPL
524366	2001 XR_{254}	—	December 10, 2001	Mauna Kea	D. C. Jewitt, S. S. Sheppard, Kleyna, J.	cubewano (cold) · moon	171 km	MPC · JPL
524367	2001 XU_{255}	—	September 25, 2011	Haleakala	Pan-STARRS 1	EOS	1.9 km	MPC · JPL
524368	2001 XT_{265}	—	December 14, 2001	Kitt Peak	Spacewatch	JUN	910 m	MPC · JPL
524369	2001 YB_{4}	—	December 22, 2001	Socorro	LINEAR	·	1.3 km	MPC · JPL
524370	2001 YJ_{12}	—	December 17, 2001	Socorro	LINEAR	·	1.6 km	MPC · JPL
524371	2001 YM_{12}	—	December 17, 2001	Socorro	LINEAR	PHO	750 m	MPC · JPL
524372	2001 YP_{16}	—	December 17, 2001	Socorro	LINEAR	·	1.3 km	MPC · JPL
524373	2001 YM_{18}	—	December 9, 2001	Socorro	LINEAR	T_{j} (2.96)	3.2 km	MPC · JPL
524374	2001 YG_{19}	—	November 20, 2001	Socorro	LINEAR	·	1.5 km	MPC · JPL
524375	2001 YS_{19}	—	December 18, 2001	Socorro	LINEAR	·	2.5 km	MPC · JPL
524376	2001 YL_{35}	—	December 18, 2001	Socorro	LINEAR	·	4.1 km	MPC · JPL
524377	2001 YN_{36}	—	December 18, 2001	Socorro	LINEAR	·	780 m	MPC · JPL
524378	2001 YX_{39}	—	December 18, 2001	Socorro	LINEAR	·	2.9 km	MPC · JPL
524379	2001 YM_{55}	—	December 18, 2001	Socorro	LINEAR	·	550 m	MPC · JPL
524380	2001 YS_{56}	—	December 18, 2001	Socorro	LINEAR	·	4.0 km	MPC · JPL
524381	2001 YU_{76}	—	December 18, 2001	Socorro	LINEAR	·	2.2 km	MPC · JPL
524382	2001 YO_{82}	—	December 18, 2001	Socorro	LINEAR	JUN	930 m	MPC · JPL
524383	2001 YS_{92}	—	December 17, 2001	Kitt Peak	Spacewatch	·	4.6 km	MPC · JPL
524384	2001 YR_{100}	—	December 17, 2001	Socorro	LINEAR	·	860 m	MPC · JPL
524385	2001 YJ_{106}	—	December 17, 2001	Kitt Peak	Spacewatch	·	1.3 km	MPC · JPL
524386	2001 YB_{124}	—	December 9, 2001	Socorro	LINEAR	·	1.8 km	MPC · JPL
524387	2001 YN_{129}	—	December 9, 2001	Socorro	LINEAR	·	3.6 km	MPC · JPL
524388	2001 YN_{138}	—	December 17, 2001	Kitt Peak	Spacewatch	T_{j} (2.97)	3.3 km	MPC · JPL
524389	2001 YJ_{142}	—	December 17, 2001	Kitt Peak	Spacewatch	·	870 m	MPC · JPL
524390	2001 YK_{146}	—	November 20, 2001	Socorro	LINEAR	·	2.3 km	MPC · JPL
524391	2002 AD_{2}	—	January 7, 2002	Haleakala	NEAT	AMO	270 m	MPC · JPL
524392	2002 AU_{5}	—	January 9, 2002	Socorro	LINEAR	APO +1km	970 m	MPC · JPL
524393	2002 AM_{6}	—	January 6, 2002	Socorro	LINEAR	·	2.2 km	MPC · JPL
524394	2002 AY_{14}	—	January 6, 2002	Socorro	LINEAR	H	680 m	MPC · JPL
524395	2002 AW_{17}	—	January 12, 2002	Socorro	LINEAR	·	1.9 km	MPC · JPL
524396	2002 AL_{21}	—	December 18, 2001	Socorro	LINEAR	·	1.5 km	MPC · JPL
524397	2002 AA_{33}	—	January 6, 2002	Kitt Peak	Spacewatch	·	2.7 km	MPC · JPL
524398	2002 AG_{33}	—	January 6, 2002	Kitt Peak	Spacewatch	·	3.3 km	MPC · JPL
524399	2002 AN_{44}	—	January 9, 2002	Socorro	LINEAR	T_{j} (2.98)	3.7 km	MPC · JPL
524400	2002 AY_{44}	—	January 9, 2002	Socorro	LINEAR	·	2.1 km	MPC · JPL

== 524401–524500 ==
back to top

Designation			Discovery			Properties		Ref
Permanent	Provisional	Named after	Date	Site	Discoverer(s)	Category	Diam.	Ref
524401	2002 AQ_{48}	—	December 23, 2001	Kitt Peak	Spacewatch	·	2.6 km	MPC · JPL
524402	2002 AP_{56}	—	January 9, 2002	Socorro	LINEAR	·	1.1 km	MPC · JPL
524403	2002 AD_{74}	—	January 8, 2002	Socorro	LINEAR	·	2.1 km	MPC · JPL
524404	2002 AH_{74}	—	December 18, 2001	Socorro	LINEAR	·	1.3 km	MPC · JPL
524405	2002 AM_{126}	—	January 13, 2002	Socorro	LINEAR	·	1.6 km	MPC · JPL
524406	2002 AK_{127}	—	December 19, 2001	Kitt Peak	Spacewatch	HNS	1.1 km	MPC · JPL
524407	2002 AZ_{167}	—	January 14, 2002	Socorro	LINEAR	·	4.0 km	MPC · JPL
524408	2002 AU_{171}	—	January 14, 2002	Socorro	LINEAR	MAR	1.1 km	MPC · JPL
524409	2002 AQ_{182}	—	December 17, 2001	Socorro	LINEAR	T_{j} (2.99) · EUP	3.9 km	MPC · JPL
524410	2002 AY_{183}	—	December 17, 2001	Socorro	LINEAR	·	1.5 km	MPC · JPL
524411	2002 AW_{189}	—	December 14, 2001	Kitt Peak	Spacewatch	·	630 m	MPC · JPL
524412	2002 AF_{190}	—	December 17, 2001	Socorro	LINEAR	(194)	1.2 km	MPC · JPL
524413	2002 AO_{191}	—	January 13, 2002	Kitt Peak	Spacewatch	VER	2.3 km	MPC · JPL
524414	2002 AH_{193}	—	January 12, 2002	Kitt Peak	Spacewatch	·	2.0 km	MPC · JPL
524415	2002 AT_{195}	—	January 13, 2002	Kitt Peak	Spacewatch	·	4.2 km	MPC · JPL
524416	2002 AG_{196}	—	January 12, 2002	Kitt Peak	Spacewatch	·	660 m	MPC · JPL
524417	2002 AN_{198}	—	December 14, 2001	Kitt Peak	Spacewatch	·	2.3 km	MPC · JPL
524418	2002 AD_{200}	—	December 10, 2001	Kitt Peak	Spacewatch	THB	2.2 km	MPC · JPL
524419	2002 AD_{201}	—	January 8, 2002	Kitt Peak	Spacewatch	·	1.5 km	MPC · JPL
524420	2002 BW_{30}	—	January 19, 2002	Anderson Mesa	LONEOS	·	620 m	MPC · JPL
524421	2002 CN_{12}	—	February 6, 2002	Socorro	LINEAR	·	1.3 km	MPC · JPL
524422	2002 CJ_{25}	—	February 7, 2002	Kitt Peak	Spacewatch	EUN	1.2 km	MPC · JPL
524423	2002 CR_{89}	—	February 7, 2002	Socorro	LINEAR	·	1.5 km	MPC · JPL
524424	2002 CF_{90}	—	February 7, 2002	Kitt Peak	Spacewatch	·	2.7 km	MPC · JPL
524425	2002 CP_{118}	—	January 5, 2002	Kitt Peak	Spacewatch	EOS	2.6 km	MPC · JPL
524426	2002 CH_{135}	—	February 8, 2002	Socorro	LINEAR	·	2.9 km	MPC · JPL
524427	2002 CV_{148}	—	February 10, 2002	Socorro	LINEAR	·	1.6 km	MPC · JPL
524428	2002 CV_{150}	—	February 10, 2002	Socorro	LINEAR	·	850 m	MPC · JPL
524429	2002 CM_{158}	—	February 7, 2002	Kitt Peak	Spacewatch	EUN	1.2 km	MPC · JPL
524430	2002 CD_{163}	—	February 8, 2002	Socorro	LINEAR	EUN	2.1 km	MPC · JPL
524431	2002 CB_{184}	—	February 9, 2002	Kitt Peak	Spacewatch	MAR	1.0 km	MPC · JPL
524432	2002 CN_{188}	—	February 10, 2002	Socorro	LINEAR	·	640 m	MPC · JPL
524433	2002 CB_{195}	—	February 10, 2002	Socorro	LINEAR	·	840 m	MPC · JPL
524434	2002 CU_{205}	—	February 9, 2002	Kitt Peak	Spacewatch	T_{j} (2.99)	3.8 km	MPC · JPL
524435	2002 CY_{248}	—	February 6, 2002	Kitt Peak	M. W. Buie	cubewano (hot)	391 km	MPC · JPL
524436	2002 CL_{255}	—	February 6, 2002	Kitt Peak	Spacewatch	·	1.2 km	MPC · JPL
524437	2002 CN_{265}	—	February 6, 2002	Kitt Peak	Spacewatch	·	1.1 km	MPC · JPL
524438	2002 CU_{265}	—	February 7, 2002	Kitt Peak	Spacewatch	MAR	1.1 km	MPC · JPL
524439	2002 CN_{275}	—	February 9, 2002	Kitt Peak	Spacewatch	·	3.2 km	MPC · JPL
524440	2002 CS_{278}	—	February 7, 2002	Kitt Peak	Spacewatch	·	590 m	MPC · JPL
524441	2002 CW_{279}	—	February 7, 2002	Kitt Peak	Spacewatch	·	1.2 km	MPC · JPL
524442	2002 CY_{285}	—	February 10, 2002	Kitt Peak	Spacewatch	·	1.4 km	MPC · JPL
524443	2002 DA_{4}	—	February 22, 2002	Socorro	LINEAR	·	1.2 km	MPC · JPL
524444	2002 DC_{14}	—	February 16, 2002	Palomar	NEAT	·	1.8 km	MPC · JPL
524445	2002 EG_{10}	—	March 13, 2002	Palomar	NEAT	T_{j} (2.96)	3.8 km	MPC · JPL
524446	2002 EC_{13}	—	March 12, 2002	Palomar	NEAT	·	2.7 km	MPC · JPL
524447	2002 EX_{14}	—	March 5, 2002	Kitt Peak	Spacewatch	EUN	940 m	MPC · JPL
524448	2002 EP_{18}	—	March 9, 2002	Kitt Peak	Spacewatch	·	600 m	MPC · JPL
524449	2002 EZ_{38}	—	March 12, 2002	Kitt Peak	Spacewatch	·	2.1 km	MPC · JPL
524450	2002 EH_{50}	—	March 7, 2002	Cima Ekar	ADAS	·	710 m	MPC · JPL
524451	2002 EW_{79}	—	March 12, 2002	Palomar	NEAT	·	2.6 km	MPC · JPL
524452	2002 EV_{81}	—	March 13, 2002	Palomar	NEAT	·	1.2 km	MPC · JPL
524453	2002 ET_{116}	—	March 9, 2002	Kitt Peak	Spacewatch	·	850 m	MPC · JPL
524454	2002 EB_{119}	—	March 10, 2002	Anderson Mesa	LONEOS	ADE	1.8 km	MPC · JPL
524455	2002 EY_{130}	—	March 12, 2002	Palomar	NEAT	·	1.3 km	MPC · JPL
524456	2002 EP_{132}	—	March 13, 2002	Kitt Peak	Spacewatch	PHO	700 m	MPC · JPL
524457	2002 FW_{6}	—	March 20, 2002	Mauna Kea	B. Gladman, J. J. Kavelaars, A. Doressoundiram	res · 3:4	109 km	MPC · JPL
524458	2002 FT_{18}	—	March 18, 2002	Kitt Peak	M. W. Buie	·	850 m	MPC · JPL
524459	2002 GA	—	April 1, 2002	Socorro	LINEAR	APO	300 m	MPC · JPL
524460	2002 GF_{32}	—	April 8, 2002	Cerro Tololo	M. W. Buie	plutino	254 km	MPC · JPL
524461	2002 GR_{46}	—	March 24, 2002	Kitt Peak	Spacewatch	·	950 m	MPC · JPL
524462	2002 GC_{82}	—	April 10, 2002	Socorro	LINEAR	·	660 m	MPC · JPL
524463	2002 GR_{89}	—	April 8, 2002	Palomar	NEAT	·	2.5 km	MPC · JPL
524464	2002 GK_{97}	—	March 20, 2002	Kitt Peak	Spacewatch	HNS	1.4 km	MPC · JPL
524465	2002 GR_{124}	—	April 5, 2002	Anderson Mesa	LONEOS	·	1.7 km	MPC · JPL
524466	2002 GL_{173}	—	April 10, 2002	Socorro	LINEAR	·	3.4 km	MPC · JPL
524467	2002 GJ_{181}	—	April 13, 2002	Palomar	NEAT	·	1.4 km	MPC · JPL
524468	2002 GQ_{185}	—	April 9, 2002	Palomar	NEAT	HYG	2.8 km	MPC · JPL
524469	2002 GA_{192}	—	March 15, 2002	Kitt Peak	Spacewatch	THB	2.9 km	MPC · JPL
524470	2002 HQ_{13}	—	April 22, 2002	Socorro	LINEAR	T_{j} (2.97)	3.6 km	MPC · JPL
524471	2002 JW_{15}	—	May 8, 2002	Socorro	LINEAR	ATE	300 m	MPC · JPL
524472	2002 JE_{96}	—	May 11, 2002	Socorro	LINEAR	·	720 m	MPC · JPL
524473	2002 JW_{100}	—	April 10, 2002	Socorro	LINEAR	·	610 m	MPC · JPL
524474	2002 KJ_{3}	—	May 18, 2002	Palomar	NEAT	AMO	470 m	MPC · JPL
524475	2002 KJ_{4}	—	May 22, 2002	Socorro	LINEAR	AMO · APO · PHA	480 m	MPC · JPL
524476	2002 KZ_{11}	—	May 8, 2002	Kitt Peak	Spacewatch	·	940 m	MPC · JPL
524477	2002 LV_{6}	—	June 7, 2002	Socorro	LINEAR	·	710 m	MPC · JPL
524478	2002 LF_{61}	—	June 3, 2002	Palomar	NEAT	·	1.1 km	MPC · JPL
524479	2002 NV_{71}	—	July 9, 2002	Palomar	NEAT	·	1.1 km	MPC · JPL
524480	2002 OH_{33}	—	July 18, 2002	Palomar	NEAT	·	930 m	MPC · JPL
524481	2002 PZ_{10}	—	August 6, 2002	Palomar	NEAT	·	2.1 km	MPC · JPL
524482	2002 PT_{76}	—	August 11, 2002	Palomar	NEAT	·	1.4 km	MPC · JPL
524483	2002 PT_{80}	—	August 11, 2002	Palomar	NEAT	·	1.0 km	MPC · JPL
524484	2002 PP_{114}	—	September 20, 1995	Kitt Peak	Spacewatch	·	770 m	MPC · JPL
524485	2002 PL_{178}	—	August 15, 2002	Palomar	NEAT	·	950 m	MPC · JPL
524486	2002 PP_{202}	—	February 2, 2000	Kitt Peak	Spacewatch	·	2.5 km	MPC · JPL
524487	2002 QH_{5}	—	August 16, 2002	Palomar	NEAT	·	730 m	MPC · JPL
524488	2002 QR_{81}	—	August 30, 2002	Palomar	NEAT	·	890 m	MPC · JPL
524489	2002 QU_{97}	—	August 18, 2002	Palomar	NEAT	T_{j} (2.95)	2.8 km	MPC · JPL
524490	2002 QA_{112}	—	August 31, 2002	Palomar	NEAT	T_{j} (2.94)	4.6 km	MPC · JPL
524491	2002 QJ_{131}	—	August 30, 2002	Palomar	NEAT	3:2	5.2 km	MPC · JPL
524492	2002 QQ_{150}	—	March 2, 2001	Anderson Mesa	LONEOS	NYS	1.3 km	MPC · JPL
524493	2002 RM	—	September 2, 2002	Ondřejov	P. Kušnirák, P. Pravec	T_{j} (2.99) · 3:2	5.3 km	MPC · JPL
524494	2002 RX_{30}	—	September 4, 2002	Anderson Mesa	LONEOS	·	1.2 km	MPC · JPL
524495	2002 RV_{48}	—	September 5, 2002	Socorro	LINEAR	·	1.7 km	MPC · JPL
524496	2002 RG_{53}	—	September 5, 2002	Socorro	LINEAR	·	1.3 km	MPC · JPL
524497	2002 RO_{77}	—	August 29, 2002	Kitt Peak	Spacewatch	·	1.9 km	MPC · JPL
524498	2002 RT_{112}	—	September 6, 2002	Socorro	LINEAR	·	1.0 km	MPC · JPL
524499	2002 RH_{160}	—	September 12, 2002	Palomar	NEAT	T_{j} (2.98) · 3:2 · SHU	4.7 km	MPC · JPL
524500	2002 RD_{179}	—	September 14, 2002	Kitt Peak	Spacewatch	KOR	1.1 km	MPC · JPL

== 524501–524600 ==
back to top

Designation			Discovery			Properties		Ref
Permanent	Provisional	Named after	Date	Site	Discoverer(s)	Category	Diam.	Ref
524501	2002 RH_{181}	—	September 6, 2002	Socorro	LINEAR	PHO	760 m	MPC · JPL
524502	2002 RE_{254}	—	September 14, 2002	Palomar	NEAT	3:2	4.1 km	MPC · JPL
524503	2002 RJ_{274}	—	September 4, 2002	Palomar	NEAT	·	1.3 km	MPC · JPL
524504	2002 SD_{28}	—	September 5, 2002	Socorro	LINEAR	·	660 m	MPC · JPL
524505	2002 SY_{58}	—	September 30, 2002	Socorro	LINEAR	AEG	2.4 km	MPC · JPL
524506	2002 SU_{73}	—	September 16, 2002	Palomar	NEAT	·	2.2 km	MPC · JPL
524507	2002 TU_{87}	—	October 3, 2002	Socorro	LINEAR	NYS	1.2 km	MPC · JPL
524508	2002 TR_{96}	—	October 10, 2002	Anderson Mesa	LONEOS	T_{j} (2.91)	1.9 km	MPC · JPL
524509	2002 TG_{122}	—	October 3, 2002	Campo Imperatore	CINEOS	H	510 m	MPC · JPL
524510	2002 TY_{229}	—	October 9, 2002	Kitt Peak	Spacewatch	·	1 km	MPC · JPL
524511	2002 TJ_{247}	—	October 10, 2002	Kitt Peak	Spacewatch	H	490 m	MPC · JPL
524512	2002 TV_{317}	—	September 13, 2007	Kitt Peak	Spacewatch	·	1.6 km	MPC · JPL
524513	2002 TA_{374}	—	October 9, 2002	Palomar	NEAT	·	1.4 km	MPC · JPL
524514	2002 TS_{379}	—	October 6, 2002	Palomar	NEAT	·	1.3 km	MPC · JPL
524515	2002 TP_{387}	—	September 13, 2007	Mount Lemmon	Mount Lemmon Survey	KOR	1.6 km	MPC · JPL
524516	2002 UN	—	October 22, 2002	Palomar	NEAT	T_{j} (2.81) · AMO +1km	1.2 km	MPC · JPL
524517	2002 UN_{24}	—	October 29, 2002	Kitt Peak	Spacewatch	·	3.2 km	MPC · JPL
524518	2002 UE_{43}	—	October 30, 2002	Kitt Peak	Spacewatch	EOS	2.0 km	MPC · JPL
524519	2002 UT_{43}	—	October 30, 2002	Kitt Peak	Spacewatch	·	1.2 km	MPC · JPL
524520	2002 UZ_{49}	—	November 7, 2002	Kitt Peak	Deep Ecliptic Survey	KOR	1.3 km	MPC · JPL
524521	2002 UC_{74}	—	September 2, 1994	Kitt Peak	Spacewatch	MAS	870 m	MPC · JPL
524522 Zoozve	2002 VE_{68}	Zoozve	November 11, 2002	Anderson Mesa	LONEOS	ATE · PHA	280 m	MPC · JPL
524523	2002 VU_{95}	—	October 16, 1998	Kitt Peak	Spacewatch	·	1.3 km	MPC · JPL
524524	2002 VV_{97}	—	November 12, 2002	Socorro	LINEAR	·	2.8 km	MPC · JPL
524525	2002 VY_{145}	—	November 5, 2002	Palomar	NEAT	·	1.4 km	MPC · JPL
524526	2002 XC_{57}	—	December 5, 2002	Socorro	LINEAR	·	3.6 km	MPC · JPL
524527	2002 XU_{59}	—	December 10, 2002	Socorro	LINEAR	·	1.5 km	MPC · JPL
524528	2002 XF_{66}	—	November 14, 1996	Kitt Peak	Spacewatch	·	3.2 km	MPC · JPL
524529	2002 XP_{85}	—	December 11, 2002	Socorro	LINEAR	·	1.8 km	MPC · JPL
524530	2002 XC_{91}	—	December 13, 2002	Kitt Peak	Spacewatch	APO	410 m	MPC · JPL
524531	2002 XH_{91}	—	December 4, 2002	Kitt Peak	M. W. Buie	cubewano (cold) · moon	216 km	MPC · JPL
524532	2002 XW_{105}	—	December 5, 2002	Socorro	LINEAR	·	1.4 km	MPC · JPL
524533	2002 YZ_{33}	—	December 31, 2002	Socorro	LINEAR	MAR	1.2 km	MPC · JPL
524534	2003 AO	—	December 5, 2002	Socorro	LINEAR	·	2.8 km	MPC · JPL
524535	2003 AC_{3}	—	January 1, 2003	Kitt Peak	Spacewatch	·	2.9 km	MPC · JPL
524536	2003 AO_{4}	—	January 5, 2003	Anderson Mesa	LONEOS	AMO	540 m	MPC · JPL
524537	2003 AL_{10}	—	January 1, 2003	Socorro	LINEAR	·	2.9 km	MPC · JPL
524538	2003 AN_{16}	—	December 31, 2002	Socorro	LINEAR	·	1.2 km	MPC · JPL
524539	2003 AQ_{27}	—	January 4, 2003	Socorro	LINEAR	MAR	1.4 km	MPC · JPL
524540	2003 AA_{47}	—	January 5, 2003	Socorro	LINEAR	·	1.2 km	MPC · JPL
524541	2003 AS_{61}	—	January 7, 2003	Socorro	LINEAR	·	1.2 km	MPC · JPL
524542	2003 AN_{79}	—	January 11, 2003	Socorro	LINEAR	·	1.3 km	MPC · JPL
524543	2003 AK_{82}	—	January 13, 2003	Socorro	LINEAR	·	1.8 km	MPC · JPL
524544	2003 BA_{9}	—	January 26, 2003	Anderson Mesa	LONEOS	·	2.7 km	MPC · JPL
524545	2003 BW_{21}	—	January 4, 2003	Socorro	LINEAR	·	1.4 km	MPC · JPL
524546	2003 BZ_{90}	—	January 9, 2003	Socorro	LINEAR	·	4.1 km	MPC · JPL
524547	2003 BQ_{93}	—	January 29, 2003	Palomar	NEAT	·	1.6 km	MPC · JPL
524548	2003 DL_{15}	—	February 26, 2003	Socorro	LINEAR	·	1.7 km	MPC · JPL
524549	2003 EL_{13}	—	January 27, 2003	Socorro	LINEAR	H	540 m	MPC · JPL
524550	2003 EM_{16}	—	March 8, 2003	Socorro	LINEAR	·	1.8 km	MPC · JPL
524551	2003 EP_{32}	—	March 9, 2003	Socorro	LINEAR	H	480 m	MPC · JPL
524552	2003 EH_{43}	—	March 10, 2003	Kitt Peak	Spacewatch	·	850 m	MPC · JPL
524553	2003 EM_{43}	—	March 9, 2003	Socorro	LINEAR	H	520 m	MPC · JPL
524554	2003 EE_{56}	—	March 11, 2003	Kitt Peak	Spacewatch	·	1.2 km	MPC · JPL
524555	2003 FH_{13}	—	March 23, 2003	Kitt Peak	Spacewatch	·	3.6 km	MPC · JPL
524556	2003 FL_{37}	—	March 23, 2003	Kitt Peak	Spacewatch	·	2.8 km	MPC · JPL
524557	2003 FG_{40}	—	March 24, 2003	Kitt Peak	Spacewatch	·	2.0 km	MPC · JPL
524558	2003 FY_{83}	—	March 28, 2003	Campo Imperatore	CINEOS	·	2.3 km	MPC · JPL
524559	2003 FA_{94}	—	March 29, 2003	Anderson Mesa	LONEOS	·	2.6 km	MPC · JPL
524560	2003 FQ_{96}	—	March 30, 2003	Kitt Peak	Spacewatch	·	1.4 km	MPC · JPL
524561	2003 FT_{96}	—	March 30, 2003	Kitt Peak	Spacewatch	·	2.0 km	MPC · JPL
524562	2003 FN_{97}	—	March 24, 2003	Kitt Peak	Spacewatch	EUN	1.1 km	MPC · JPL
524563	2003 FV_{99}	—	March 31, 2003	Kitt Peak	Spacewatch	·	1.3 km	MPC · JPL
524564	2003 FW_{99}	—	March 31, 2003	Kitt Peak	Spacewatch	·	1.7 km	MPC · JPL
524565	2003 GX_{15}	—	March 23, 2003	Kitt Peak	Spacewatch	·	1.4 km	MPC · JPL
524566	2003 GU_{17}	—	April 4, 2003	Kitt Peak	Spacewatch	·	1.3 km	MPC · JPL
524567	2003 GF_{18}	—	September 26, 2011	Haleakala	Pan-STARRS 1	·	2.3 km	MPC · JPL
524568	2003 GB_{20}	—	August 21, 2000	Anderson Mesa	LONEOS	·	1.3 km	MPC · JPL
524569	2003 GH_{20}	—	March 10, 2003	Campo Imperatore	CINEOS	·	1.7 km	MPC · JPL
524570	2003 GT_{27}	—	April 7, 2003	Kitt Peak	Spacewatch	·	2.5 km	MPC · JPL
524571	2003 GO_{36}	—	October 1, 2000	Anderson Mesa	LONEOS	·	1.7 km	MPC · JPL
524572	2003 GO_{38}	—	April 7, 2003	Kitt Peak	Spacewatch	·	2.8 km	MPC · JPL
524573	2003 GD_{53}	—	April 10, 2003	Kitt Peak	Spacewatch	H	560 m	MPC · JPL
524574	2003 HN_{5}	—	April 24, 2003	Kitt Peak	Spacewatch	·	3.4 km	MPC · JPL
524575	2003 HP_{19}	—	April 26, 2003	Kitt Peak	Spacewatch	·	3.1 km	MPC · JPL
524576	2003 HT_{19}	—	April 26, 2003	Kitt Peak	Spacewatch	·	1.5 km	MPC · JPL
524577	2003 HS_{23}	—	March 26, 2003	Kitt Peak	Spacewatch	·	2.1 km	MPC · JPL
524578	2003 HD_{26}	—	April 25, 2003	Kitt Peak	Spacewatch	·	1.2 km	MPC · JPL
524579	2003 HX_{43}	—	April 30, 2003	Kitt Peak	Spacewatch	·	1.5 km	MPC · JPL
524580	2003 HQ_{56}	—	August 26, 2008	Siding Spring	SSS	·	1.9 km	MPC · JPL
524581	2003 JY	—	May 1, 2003	Kitt Peak	Spacewatch	·	520 m	MPC · JPL
524582	2003 JF_{3}	—	May 1, 2003	Kitt Peak	Spacewatch	·	2.0 km	MPC · JPL
524583	2003 JN_{4}	—	March 27, 2003	Kitt Peak	Spacewatch	·	760 m	MPC · JPL
524584	2003 JM_{9}	—	May 2, 2003	Kitt Peak	Spacewatch	KON	2.9 km	MPC · JPL
524585	2003 KR	—	May 22, 2003	Mount Graham	Mount Graham	·	1.8 km	MPC · JPL
524586	2003 KL_{12}	—	May 25, 2003	Kitt Peak	Spacewatch	·	1.7 km	MPC · JPL
524587	2003 KJ_{13}	—	April 9, 2003	Kitt Peak	Spacewatch	·	1.7 km	MPC · JPL
524588	2003 KM_{13}	—	May 27, 2003	Kitt Peak	Spacewatch	·	2.1 km	MPC · JPL
524589	2003 KB_{14}	—	May 28, 2003	Socorro	LINEAR	T_{j} (2.91)	2.9 km	MPC · JPL
524590	2003 KZ_{30}	—	April 5, 2003	Kitt Peak	Spacewatch	·	940 m	MPC · JPL
524591	2003 KT_{31}	—	April 30, 2003	Kitt Peak	Spacewatch	·	3.3 km	MPC · JPL
524592	2003 KK_{34}	—	May 28, 2003	Kitt Peak	Spacewatch	LIX	3.3 km	MPC · JPL
524593	2003 NZ	—	July 2, 2003	Haleakala	NEAT	·	790 m	MPC · JPL
524594	2003 NW_{1}	—	July 3, 2003	Socorro	LINEAR	APO · PHA	650 m	MPC · JPL
524595	2003 NT_{2}	—	July 1, 2003	Socorro	LINEAR	·	2.3 km	MPC · JPL
524596	2003 NV_{11}	—	July 3, 2003	Kitt Peak	Spacewatch	·	2.1 km	MPC · JPL
524597	2003 OQ_{13}	—	July 25, 2003	Socorro	LINEAR	AMO	280 m	MPC · JPL
524598	2003 PJ	—	August 1, 2003	Socorro	LINEAR	·	1.1 km	MPC · JPL
524599	2003 PC_{11}	—	August 5, 2003	Socorro	LINEAR	T_{j} (2.93) · AMO +1km	1.3 km	MPC · JPL
524600	2003 PY_{12}	—	August 5, 2003	Socorro	LINEAR	·	1.0 km	MPC · JPL

== 524601–524700 ==
back to top

Designation			Discovery			Properties		Ref
Permanent	Provisional	Named after	Date	Site	Discoverer(s)	Category	Diam.	Ref
524601	2003 PC_{13}	—	August 4, 2003	Kitt Peak	Spacewatch	·	1.7 km	MPC · JPL
524602	2003 QP_{9}	—	August 20, 2003	Campo Imperatore	CINEOS	·	880 m	MPC · JPL
524603	2003 QA_{31}	—	August 25, 2003	Socorro	LINEAR	APO	450 m	MPC · JPL
524604	2003 QZ_{46}	—	August 5, 2003	Socorro	LINEAR	·	900 m	MPC · JPL
524605	2003 QW_{48}	—	August 21, 2003	Campo Imperatore	CINEOS	·	700 m	MPC · JPL
524606	2003 QT_{79}	—	August 28, 2003	Palomar	NEAT	·	1.0 km	MPC · JPL
524607 Davecarter	2003 QB_{89}	Davecarter	August 26, 2003	Cerro Tololo	M. W. Buie	·	450 m	MPC · JPL
524608	2003 QG_{108}	—	August 27, 2003	Piszkéstető	K. Sárneczky, B. Sipőcz	NYS	800 m	MPC · JPL
524609	2003 QY_{108}	—	August 31, 2003	Kitt Peak	Spacewatch	·	540 m	MPC · JPL
524610	2003 QA_{109}	—	August 31, 2003	Kitt Peak	Spacewatch	·	2.1 km	MPC · JPL
524611	2003 QF_{110}	—	August 24, 2003	Cerro Tololo	Deep Ecliptic Survey	·	1.1 km	MPC · JPL
524612	2003 QA_{112}	—	August 26, 2003	Cerro Tololo	M. W. Buie	cubewano (hot)	270 km	MPC · JPL
524613	2003 QW_{113}	—	August 31, 2003	Mauna Kea	Mauna Kea	centaur	199 km	MPC · JPL
524614	2003 QA_{115}	—	August 23, 2003	Socorro	LINEAR	·	1.3 km	MPC · JPL
524615	2003 RJ_{4}	—	September 2, 2003	Socorro	LINEAR	·	1.5 km	MPC · JPL
524616	2003 RD_{21}	—	September 2, 2003	Socorro	LINEAR	·	1.5 km	MPC · JPL
524617	2003 RK_{24}	—	September 17, 2003	Kitt Peak	Spacewatch	·	1.7 km	MPC · JPL
524618	2003 RU_{27}	—	September 15, 2003	Anderson Mesa	LONEOS	·	1.1 km	MPC · JPL
524619	2003 SS	—	September 16, 2003	Kitt Peak	Spacewatch	·	590 m	MPC · JPL
524620	2003 SK_{1}	—	September 16, 2003	Kitt Peak	Spacewatch	WIT	910 m	MPC · JPL
524621	2003 SF_{7}	—	September 16, 2003	Kitt Peak	Spacewatch	·	820 m	MPC · JPL
524622	2003 SO_{8}	—	September 16, 2003	Kitt Peak	Spacewatch	·	840 m	MPC · JPL
524623	2003 SF_{9}	—	September 17, 2003	Kitt Peak	Spacewatch	KOR	1.0 km	MPC · JPL
524624	2003 SN_{12}	—	September 16, 2003	Kitt Peak	Spacewatch	DOR	2.3 km	MPC · JPL
524625	2003 SJ_{62}	—	September 3, 2003	Socorro	LINEAR	·	980 m	MPC · JPL
524626	2003 SS_{63}	—	September 17, 2003	Kitt Peak	Spacewatch	·	530 m	MPC · JPL
524627	2003 SL_{69}	—	September 17, 2003	Kitt Peak	Spacewatch	KOR	1.3 km	MPC · JPL
524628	2003 SU_{72}	—	September 18, 2003	Kitt Peak	Spacewatch	·	1.4 km	MPC · JPL
524629	2003 SQ_{74}	—	September 18, 2003	Kitt Peak	Spacewatch	·	740 m	MPC · JPL
524630	2003 SL_{82}	—	September 18, 2003	Socorro	LINEAR	·	960 m	MPC · JPL
524631	2003 SC_{100}	—	September 20, 2003	Kitt Peak	Spacewatch	·	840 m	MPC · JPL
524632	2003 SH_{105}	—	September 20, 2003	Kitt Peak	Spacewatch	MAS	500 m	MPC · JPL
524633	2003 SP_{105}	—	September 20, 2003	Kitt Peak	Spacewatch	MAS	660 m	MPC · JPL
524634	2003 SS_{106}	—	September 20, 2003	Kitt Peak	Spacewatch	·	1.9 km	MPC · JPL
524635	2003 SS_{130}	—	August 25, 2003	Socorro	LINEAR	·	1.2 km	MPC · JPL
524636	2003 SJ_{133}	—	September 21, 2003	Kitt Peak	Spacewatch	·	630 m	MPC · JPL
524637	2003 SY_{151}	—	September 18, 2003	Kitt Peak	Spacewatch	NYS	1.1 km	MPC · JPL
524638 Kaffkamargit	2003 SC_{158}	Kaffkamargit	September 21, 2003	Piszkéstető	K. Sárneczky, B. Sipőcz	·	1.5 km	MPC · JPL
524639	2003 SA_{169}	—	September 17, 2003	Socorro	LINEAR	slow	1.1 km	MPC · JPL
524640	2003 SF_{173}	—	September 18, 2003	Socorro	LINEAR	·	1.8 km	MPC · JPL
524641	2003 SP_{181}	—	September 20, 2003	Anderson Mesa	LONEOS	·	1.4 km	MPC · JPL
524642	2003 SG_{183}	—	September 21, 2003	Kitt Peak	Spacewatch	·	1.8 km	MPC · JPL
524643	2003 SF_{187}	—	September 17, 2003	Kitt Peak	Spacewatch	·	1.4 km	MPC · JPL
524644	2003 SC_{220}	—	September 30, 2003	Tucson	Jones, G. R.	·	310 m	MPC · JPL
524645	2003 SE_{220}	—	September 18, 2003	Kitt Peak	Spacewatch	·	1.0 km	MPC · JPL
524646	2003 SO_{224}	—	September 20, 2003	Socorro	LINEAR	·	1.5 km	MPC · JPL
524647	2003 SH_{228}	—	October 9, 2008	Mount Lemmon	Mount Lemmon Survey	·	2.5 km	MPC · JPL
524648	2003 SJ_{241}	—	September 17, 2003	Kitt Peak	Spacewatch	·	1.2 km	MPC · JPL
524649	2003 SA_{254}	—	September 20, 2003	Socorro	LINEAR	·	910 m	MPC · JPL
524650	2003 SN_{254}	—	September 21, 2003	Kitt Peak	Spacewatch	·	1.0 km	MPC · JPL
524651	2003 SP_{254}	—	September 17, 2003	Kitt Peak	Spacewatch	·	890 m	MPC · JPL
524652	2003 SE_{255}	—	September 27, 2003	Kitt Peak	Spacewatch	CYB	4.0 km	MPC · JPL
524653	2003 SD_{257}	—	September 28, 2003	Kitt Peak	Spacewatch	PHO	810 m	MPC · JPL
524654	2003 SP_{262}	—	September 28, 2003	Socorro	LINEAR	·	1.1 km	MPC · JPL
524655	2003 SR_{267}	—	September 29, 2003	Kitt Peak	Spacewatch	KOR	1.5 km	MPC · JPL
524656	2003 SD_{289}	—	September 22, 2003	Anderson Mesa	LONEOS	·	1.1 km	MPC · JPL
524657	2003 SQ_{311}	—	September 18, 2003	Kitt Peak	Spacewatch	PHO	680 m	MPC · JPL
524658	2003 SD_{314}	—	September 23, 2003	Palomar	NEAT	·	1.4 km	MPC · JPL
524659	2003 SL_{316}	—	March 15, 2010	Kitt Peak	Spacewatch	·	1.4 km	MPC · JPL
524660	2003 SV_{323}	—	September 16, 2003	Kitt Peak	Spacewatch	·	800 m	MPC · JPL
524661	2003 SB_{327}	—	September 18, 2003	Kitt Peak	Spacewatch	MAS	440 m	MPC · JPL
524662	2003 SC_{332}	—	September 27, 2003	Kitt Peak	Spacewatch	·	910 m	MPC · JPL
524663	2003 SD_{334}	—	September 22, 2003	Kitt Peak	Spacewatch	MAS	500 m	MPC · JPL
524664	2003 SA_{336}	—	September 26, 2003	Apache Point	SDSS	·	590 m	MPC · JPL
524665	2003 SD_{343}	—	September 17, 2003	Kitt Peak	Spacewatch	ADE	3.4 km	MPC · JPL
524666	2003 SN_{344}	—	September 17, 2003	Kitt Peak	Spacewatch	·	1.1 km	MPC · JPL
524667	2003 SX_{357}	—	September 20, 2003	Kitt Peak	Spacewatch	·	1.2 km	MPC · JPL
524668	2003 SD_{359}	—	September 21, 2003	Kitt Peak	Spacewatch	NYS	1.0 km	MPC · JPL
524669	2003 SA_{360}	—	September 21, 2003	Kitt Peak	Spacewatch	·	2.0 km	MPC · JPL
524670	2003 SL_{361}	—	September 22, 2003	Kitt Peak	Spacewatch	·	1.7 km	MPC · JPL
524671	2003 SS_{402}	—	September 27, 2003	Kitt Peak	Spacewatch	NEM	2.7 km	MPC · JPL
524672	2003 SA_{429}	—	September 19, 2003	Kitt Peak	Spacewatch	MAS	480 m	MPC · JPL
524673	2003 SH_{429}	—	September 21, 2003	Campo Imperatore	CINEOS	·	1.6 km	MPC · JPL
524674	2003 SV_{429}	—	September 28, 2003	Apache Point	SDSS	·	1.7 km	MPC · JPL
524675	2003 ST_{431}	—	September 16, 2003	Kitt Peak	Spacewatch	·	770 m	MPC · JPL
524676	2003 SK_{432}	—	September 18, 2003	Kitt Peak	Spacewatch	PHO	920 m	MPC · JPL
524677	2003 SL_{434}	—	October 2, 2003	Kitt Peak	Spacewatch	·	1.7 km	MPC · JPL
524678	2003 TA	—	October 1, 2003	Kitt Peak	Spacewatch	·	1.1 km	MPC · JPL
524679	2003 TW_{5}	—	October 3, 2003	Kitt Peak	Spacewatch	·	2.7 km	MPC · JPL
524680	2003 TM_{22}	—	October 1, 2003	Kitt Peak	Spacewatch	·	2.4 km	MPC · JPL
524681	2003 TL_{23}	—	October 1, 2003	Kitt Peak	Spacewatch	·	2.4 km	MPC · JPL
524682	2003 TT_{27}	—	October 1, 2003	Kitt Peak	Spacewatch	·	1.7 km	MPC · JPL
524683	2003 TY_{28}	—	October 1, 2003	Kitt Peak	Spacewatch	·	1.5 km	MPC · JPL
524684	2003 TB_{29}	—	September 18, 2003	Kitt Peak	Spacewatch	T_{j} (2.98)	3.0 km	MPC · JPL
524685	2003 TG_{29}	—	October 1, 2003	Kitt Peak	Spacewatch	GEF	1.1 km	MPC · JPL
524686	2003 TE_{31}	—	October 1, 2003	Kitt Peak	Spacewatch	·	1.6 km	MPC · JPL
524687	2003 TR_{32}	—	October 1, 2003	Kitt Peak	Spacewatch	MAS	610 m	MPC · JPL
524688	2003 TD_{34}	—	October 1, 2003	Kitt Peak	Spacewatch	·	710 m	MPC · JPL
524689	2003 TL_{35}	—	October 1, 2003	Kitt Peak	Spacewatch	·	1.4 km	MPC · JPL
524690	2003 TA_{36}	—	October 1, 2003	Kitt Peak	Spacewatch	·	1.3 km	MPC · JPL
524691	2003 TK_{40}	—	October 2, 2003	Kitt Peak	Spacewatch	·	1.9 km	MPC · JPL
524692	2003 TS_{46}	—	September 16, 2003	Kitt Peak	Spacewatch	·	1.1 km	MPC · JPL
524693	2003 TD_{47}	—	October 3, 2003	Kitt Peak	Spacewatch	·	910 m	MPC · JPL
524694	2003 TS_{52}	—	October 5, 2003	Kitt Peak	Spacewatch	·	1.4 km	MPC · JPL
524695	2003 TD_{53}	—	October 5, 2003	Kitt Peak	Spacewatch	·	2.3 km	MPC · JPL
524696	2003 TC_{55}	—	October 5, 2003	Kitt Peak	Spacewatch	·	1.3 km	MPC · JPL
524697	2003 TO_{59}	—	October 2, 2003	Kitt Peak	Spacewatch	·	1.7 km	MPC · JPL
524698	2003 TS_{59}	—	October 2, 2003	Kitt Peak	Spacewatch	·	820 m	MPC · JPL
524699	2003 TV_{59}	—	October 2, 2003	Kitt Peak	Spacewatch	·	1.4 km	MPC · JPL
524700	2003 UB_{15}	—	September 22, 2003	Kitt Peak	Spacewatch	·	550 m	MPC · JPL

== 524701–524800 ==
back to top

Designation			Discovery			Properties		Ref
Permanent	Provisional	Named after	Date	Site	Discoverer(s)	Category	Diam.	Ref
524701	2003 US_{19}	—	October 21, 2003	Kitt Peak	Spacewatch	V	490 m	MPC · JPL
524702	2003 UT_{19}	—	October 22, 2003	Palomar	NEAT	·	1.4 km	MPC · JPL
524703	2003 UG_{20}	—	October 22, 2003	Socorro	LINEAR	H	430 m	MPC · JPL
524704	2003 UY_{26}	—	October 16, 2003	Goodricke-Pigott	R. A. Tucker	·	1.1 km	MPC · JPL
524705	2003 UL_{33}	—	October 1, 2003	Kitt Peak	Spacewatch	·	1.6 km	MPC · JPL
524706	2003 UH_{34}	—	October 17, 2003	Kitt Peak	Spacewatch	PAD	1.9 km	MPC · JPL
524707	2003 UM_{34}	—	October 18, 2003	Kitt Peak	Spacewatch	·	990 m	MPC · JPL
524708	2003 UO_{34}	—	October 17, 2003	Kitt Peak	Spacewatch	·	1.1 km	MPC · JPL
524709	2003 UH_{42}	—	October 17, 2003	Kitt Peak	Spacewatch	·	660 m	MPC · JPL
524710	2003 UV_{44}	—	October 18, 2003	Kitt Peak	Spacewatch	AGN	1.4 km	MPC · JPL
524711	2003 UJ_{46}	—	October 18, 2003	Kitt Peak	Spacewatch	AST	1.7 km	MPC · JPL
524712	2003 UC_{48}	—	October 16, 2003	Kitt Peak	Spacewatch	·	2.1 km	MPC · JPL
524713	2003 UT_{71}	—	September 29, 2003	Socorro	LINEAR	V	640 m	MPC · JPL
524714	2003 UT_{72}	—	October 19, 2003	Kitt Peak	Spacewatch	HOF	2.2 km	MPC · JPL
524715	2003 UV_{94}	—	September 28, 2003	Socorro	LINEAR	(1547)	1.3 km	MPC · JPL
524716	2003 UR_{105}	—	September 29, 2003	Kitt Peak	Spacewatch	·	890 m	MPC · JPL
524717	2003 US_{108}	—	October 19, 2003	Kitt Peak	Spacewatch	NYS	1.0 km	MPC · JPL
524718	2003 UT_{108}	—	October 19, 2003	Kitt Peak	Spacewatch	PHO	780 m	MPC · JPL
524719	2003 UY_{110}	—	October 19, 2003	Kitt Peak	Spacewatch	·	940 m	MPC · JPL
524720	2003 UP_{127}	—	September 22, 2003	Kitt Peak	Spacewatch	·	960 m	MPC · JPL
524721	2003 UB_{136}	—	October 4, 2003	Kitt Peak	Spacewatch	·	2.3 km	MPC · JPL
524722	2003 US_{156}	—	October 20, 2003	Socorro	LINEAR	·	820 m	MPC · JPL
524723	2003 UW_{159}	—	October 5, 2003	Kitt Peak	Spacewatch	·	1.8 km	MPC · JPL
524724	2003 UV_{161}	—	October 16, 2003	Kitt Peak	Spacewatch	·	1.8 km	MPC · JPL
524725	2003 UP_{163}	—	October 21, 2003	Socorro	LINEAR	·	1.4 km	MPC · JPL
524726	2003 UY_{167}	—	October 22, 2003	Socorro	LINEAR	GAL	1.6 km	MPC · JPL
524727	2003 UH_{179}	—	October 21, 2003	Socorro	LINEAR	MAS	580 m	MPC · JPL
524728	2003 UE_{193}	—	September 21, 2003	Kitt Peak	Spacewatch	NYS	890 m	MPC · JPL
524729	2003 UQ_{194}	—	September 29, 2003	Kitt Peak	Spacewatch	·	870 m	MPC · JPL
524730	2003 UC_{196}	—	October 21, 2003	Kitt Peak	Spacewatch	·	1.1 km	MPC · JPL
524731	2003 UE_{196}	—	October 21, 2003	Kitt Peak	Spacewatch	·	1.8 km	MPC · JPL
524732	2003 UL_{203}	—	October 21, 2003	Kitt Peak	Spacewatch	PHO	1.2 km	MPC · JPL
524733	2003 UC_{205}	—	September 19, 2003	Kitt Peak	Spacewatch	·	740 m	MPC · JPL
524734	2003 UN_{208}	—	October 22, 2003	Kitt Peak	Spacewatch	NYS	1.1 km	MPC · JPL
524735	2003 UP_{217}	—	September 28, 2003	Kitt Peak	Spacewatch	·	910 m	MPC · JPL
524736	2003 UK_{224}	—	October 22, 2003	Kitt Peak	Spacewatch	T_{j} (2.92)	3.3 km	MPC · JPL
524737	2003 UB_{231}	—	October 3, 2003	Kitt Peak	Spacewatch	EUN	1.0 km	MPC · JPL
524738	2003 UJ_{233}	—	October 24, 2003	Socorro	LINEAR	·	2.1 km	MPC · JPL
524739	2003 UK_{233}	—	October 19, 2003	Kitt Peak	Spacewatch	·	1.8 km	MPC · JPL
524740	2003 US_{244}	—	October 24, 2003	Kitt Peak	Spacewatch	·	640 m	MPC · JPL
524741	2003 UL_{251}	—	October 21, 2003	Kitt Peak	Spacewatch	·	600 m	MPC · JPL
524742	2003 UJ_{266}	—	October 21, 2003	Kitt Peak	Spacewatch	·	910 m	MPC · JPL
524743	2003 UR_{267}	—	October 28, 2003	Socorro	LINEAR	T_{j} (2.81) · unusual	2.3 km	MPC · JPL
524744	2003 UW_{271}	—	October 28, 2003	Socorro	LINEAR	NYS	1.1 km	MPC · JPL
524745	2003 UB_{278}	—	October 17, 2003	Kitt Peak	Spacewatch	·	1.1 km	MPC · JPL
524746	2003 UE_{289}	—	October 19, 2003	Kitt Peak	Spacewatch	·	860 m	MPC · JPL
524747	2003 UJ_{292}	—	October 24, 2003	Kitt Peak	Deep Ecliptic Survey	SDO	159 km	MPC · JPL
524748	2003 US_{297}	—	September 22, 2003	Kitt Peak	Spacewatch	·	620 m	MPC · JPL
524749	2003 UC_{299}	—	October 16, 2003	Kitt Peak	Spacewatch	KOR	1.5 km	MPC · JPL
524750	2003 UR_{300}	—	October 16, 2003	Kitt Peak	Spacewatch	·	1.8 km	MPC · JPL
524751	2003 UY_{300}	—	September 5, 2003	Bergisch Gladbach	W. Bickel	NAE	2.6 km	MPC · JPL
524752	2003 UB_{302}	—	October 17, 2003	Kitt Peak	Spacewatch	·	1.4 km	MPC · JPL
524753	2003 UD_{302}	—	October 3, 2003	Kitt Peak	Spacewatch	·	1.4 km	MPC · JPL
524754	2003 UV_{302}	—	October 17, 2003	Kitt Peak	Spacewatch	AGN	1.0 km	MPC · JPL
524755	2003 UU_{305}	—	October 18, 2003	Kitt Peak	Spacewatch	·	1.9 km	MPC · JPL
524756	2003 UV_{305}	—	October 18, 2003	Kitt Peak	Spacewatch	·	1.8 km	MPC · JPL
524757	2003 UT_{306}	—	September 18, 2003	Kitt Peak	Spacewatch	PHO	810 m	MPC · JPL
524758	2003 UD_{307}	—	October 18, 2003	Kitt Peak	Spacewatch	·	1.4 km	MPC · JPL
524759	2003 UA_{313}	—	November 22, 2003	Kitt Peak	Spacewatch	·	1.3 km	MPC · JPL
524760	2003 UE_{313}	—	October 25, 2003	Kitt Peak	Spacewatch	·	1.2 km	MPC · JPL
524761	2003 UJ_{313}	—	March 26, 2006	Kitt Peak	Spacewatch	·	1.6 km	MPC · JPL
524762	2003 UK_{316}	—	October 24, 2003	Socorro	LINEAR	·	850 m	MPC · JPL
524763	2003 UC_{321}	—	September 20, 2003	Kitt Peak	Spacewatch	CYB	2.9 km	MPC · JPL
524764	2003 UG_{321}	—	September 20, 2003	Kitt Peak	Spacewatch	·	1.4 km	MPC · JPL
524765	2003 UN_{322}	—	October 16, 2003	Kitt Peak	Spacewatch	·	1.8 km	MPC · JPL
524766	2003 UH_{326}	—	October 17, 2003	Apache Point	SDSS	H	340 m	MPC · JPL
524767	2003 UM_{334}	—	October 18, 2003	Apache Point	SDSS	·	660 m	MPC · JPL
524768	2003 UP_{334}	—	October 18, 2003	Apache Point	SDSS	·	1.2 km	MPC · JPL
524769	2003 UP_{337}	—	September 30, 2003	Kitt Peak	Spacewatch	·	1.6 km	MPC · JPL
524770	2003 UG_{345}	—	September 18, 2003	Kitt Peak	Spacewatch	·	1.2 km	MPC · JPL
524771	2003 UD_{350}	—	September 30, 2003	Kitt Peak	Spacewatch	·	620 m	MPC · JPL
524772	2003 UO_{355}	—	October 19, 2003	Kitt Peak	Spacewatch	·	1.8 km	MPC · JPL
524773	2003 UJ_{356}	—	October 19, 2003	Kitt Peak	Spacewatch	·	810 m	MPC · JPL
524774	2003 UC_{358}	—	October 19, 2003	Kitt Peak	Spacewatch	MAS	470 m	MPC · JPL
524775	2003 UF_{359}	—	September 28, 2003	Kitt Peak	Spacewatch	CLA	1.6 km	MPC · JPL
524776	2003 UC_{361}	—	September 27, 2003	Kitt Peak	Spacewatch	·	1.7 km	MPC · JPL
524777	2003 UF_{361}	—	September 21, 2003	Kitt Peak	Spacewatch	·	1.3 km	MPC · JPL
524778	2003 UV_{361}	—	October 20, 2003	Kitt Peak	Spacewatch	V	570 m	MPC · JPL
524779	2003 UN_{366}	—	October 20, 2003	Kitt Peak	Spacewatch	PHO	470 m	MPC · JPL
524780	2003 UR_{366}	—	October 20, 2003	Kitt Peak	Spacewatch	PHO	830 m	MPC · JPL
524781	2003 UH_{367}	—	October 2, 2003	Kitt Peak	Spacewatch	·	2.2 km	MPC · JPL
524782	2003 UZ_{367}	—	October 21, 2003	Kitt Peak	Spacewatch	AGN	980 m	MPC · JPL
524783	2003 UV_{368}	—	October 21, 2003	Kitt Peak	Spacewatch	·	1.5 km	MPC · JPL
524784	2003 UG_{400}	—	October 22, 2003	Kitt Peak	Spacewatch	MAS	530 m	MPC · JPL
524785	2003 UB_{402}	—	October 23, 2003	Apache Point	SDSS	·	750 m	MPC · JPL
524786	2003 UD_{408}	—	October 20, 2003	Kitt Peak	Spacewatch	·	940 m	MPC · JPL
524787	2003 UU_{418}	—	September 19, 2003	Kitt Peak	Spacewatch	·	1.7 km	MPC · JPL
524788	2003 VV_{6}	—	October 20, 2003	Kitt Peak	Spacewatch	·	2.0 km	MPC · JPL
524789	2003 WM_{2}	—	November 16, 2003	Kitt Peak	Spacewatch	·	650 m	MPC · JPL
524790	2003 WK_{4}	—	October 27, 2003	Kitt Peak	Spacewatch	·	2.2 km	MPC · JPL
524791	2003 WO_{15}	—	October 19, 2003	Kitt Peak	Spacewatch	·	1.2 km	MPC · JPL
524792	2003 WO_{38}	—	November 19, 2003	Socorro	LINEAR	BRA	2.1 km	MPC · JPL
524793	2003 WB_{43}	—	November 17, 2003	Catalina	CSS	PHO	700 m	MPC · JPL
524794	2003 WT_{51}	—	October 25, 2003	Kitt Peak	Spacewatch	·	2.5 km	MPC · JPL
524795	2003 WR_{65}	—	November 19, 2003	Kitt Peak	Spacewatch	·	940 m	MPC · JPL
524796	2003 WW_{106}	—	September 27, 2003	Kitt Peak	Spacewatch	·	1.8 km	MPC · JPL
524797	2003 WK_{112}	—	November 20, 2003	Socorro	LINEAR	PHO	1.0 km	MPC · JPL
524798	2003 WJ_{123}	—	November 20, 2003	Socorro	LINEAR	·	2.3 km	MPC · JPL
524799	2003 WA_{129}	—	November 21, 2003	Socorro	LINEAR	·	1.1 km	MPC · JPL
524800	2003 WP_{133}	—	November 21, 2003	Socorro	LINEAR	·	800 m	MPC · JPL

== 524801–524900 ==
back to top

Designation			Discovery			Properties		Ref
Permanent	Provisional	Named after	Date	Site	Discoverer(s)	Category	Diam.	Ref
524801	2003 WN_{156}	—	November 29, 2003	Socorro	LINEAR	·	1.2 km	MPC · JPL
524802	2003 WS_{156}	—	October 29, 2003	Kitt Peak	Spacewatch	·	890 m	MPC · JPL
524803	2003 WA_{157}	—	October 29, 2003	Kitt Peak	Spacewatch	·	1.9 km	MPC · JPL
524804	2003 WF_{165}	—	November 14, 1998	Kitt Peak	Spacewatch	KOR	1.2 km	MPC · JPL
524805	2003 WL_{173}	—	November 18, 2003	Kitt Peak	Spacewatch	·	1.9 km	MPC · JPL
524806	2003 WS_{174}	—	October 2, 2003	Kitt Peak	Spacewatch	·	1.1 km	MPC · JPL
524807	2003 WZ_{174}	—	October 22, 2003	Kitt Peak	Spacewatch	NYS	730 m	MPC · JPL
524808	2003 WA_{179}	—	October 19, 2003	Kitt Peak	Spacewatch	·	1.5 km	MPC · JPL
524809	2003 WC_{194}	—	November 24, 2003	Kitt Peak	Spacewatch	·	720 m	MPC · JPL
524810	2003 WU_{194}	—	November 16, 2003	Apache Point	SDSS	·	580 m	MPC · JPL
524811	2003 WY_{194}	—	November 19, 2003	Kitt Peak	Spacewatch	·	760 m	MPC · JPL
524812	2003 WW_{195}	—	November 24, 2003	Anderson Mesa	LONEOS	·	1.3 km	MPC · JPL
524813	2003 XG_{20}	—	December 14, 2003	Kitt Peak	Spacewatch	BRA	1.8 km	MPC · JPL
524814	2003 XD_{29}	—	December 1, 2003	Kitt Peak	Spacewatch	615	1.4 km	MPC · JPL
524815	2003 XX_{30}	—	December 1, 2003	Kitt Peak	Spacewatch	·	1.5 km	MPC · JPL
524816	2003 XM_{32}	—	December 1, 2003	Kitt Peak	Spacewatch	NYS	1 km	MPC · JPL
524817	2003 YU_{2}	—	December 3, 2003	Socorro	LINEAR	H	560 m	MPC · JPL
524818	2003 YK_{3}	—	December 19, 2003	Kingsnake	J. V. McClusky	·	1.4 km	MPC · JPL
524819	2003 YM_{8}	—	December 19, 2003	Socorro	LINEAR	·	1.5 km	MPC · JPL
524820	2003 YG_{12}	—	December 17, 2003	Socorro	LINEAR	·	2.6 km	MPC · JPL
524821	2003 YX_{23}	—	November 19, 2003	Socorro	LINEAR	·	2.4 km	MPC · JPL
524822	2003 YN_{31}	—	December 18, 2003	Socorro	LINEAR	·	2.1 km	MPC · JPL
524823	2003 YT_{41}	—	December 19, 2003	Kitt Peak	Spacewatch	PHO	880 m	MPC · JPL
524824	2003 YH_{44}	—	December 19, 2003	Kitt Peak	Spacewatch	·	2.7 km	MPC · JPL
524825	2003 YU_{69}	—	December 21, 2003	Kitt Peak	Spacewatch	·	790 m	MPC · JPL
524826	2003 YJ_{85}	—	December 19, 2003	Socorro	LINEAR	·	2.2 km	MPC · JPL
524827	2003 YC_{87}	—	December 19, 2003	Socorro	LINEAR	·	810 m	MPC · JPL
524828	2003 YL_{98}	—	December 3, 2003	Socorro	LINEAR	·	4.1 km	MPC · JPL
524829	2003 YT_{121}	—	November 29, 2003	Kitt Peak	Spacewatch	·	1.1 km	MPC · JPL
524830	2003 YE_{145}	—	December 28, 2003	Socorro	LINEAR	·	2.5 km	MPC · JPL
524831	2003 YA_{157}	—	December 16, 2003	Kitt Peak	Spacewatch	·	1.3 km	MPC · JPL
524832	2003 YE_{162}	—	December 17, 2003	Socorro	LINEAR	·	2.9 km	MPC · JPL
524833	2003 YA_{170}	—	December 18, 2003	Kitt Peak	Spacewatch	·	2.8 km	MPC · JPL
524834	2003 YL_{179}	—	December 16, 2003	Mauna Kea	Mauna Kea	cubewano (cold)	113 km	MPC · JPL
524835	2004 AB_{14}	—	January 13, 2004	Kitt Peak	Spacewatch	·	1.4 km	MPC · JPL
524836	2004 AS_{17}	—	January 15, 2004	Kitt Peak	Spacewatch	·	2.1 km	MPC · JPL
524837	2004 AE_{20}	—	January 15, 2004	Kitt Peak	Spacewatch	·	4.7 km	MPC · JPL
524838	2004 AB_{22}	—	January 15, 2004	Kitt Peak	Spacewatch	V	650 m	MPC · JPL
524839	2004 AD_{22}	—	January 15, 2004	Kitt Peak	Spacewatch	·	690 m	MPC · JPL
524840	2004 AY_{22}	—	January 15, 2004	Kitt Peak	Spacewatch	EOS	1.9 km	MPC · JPL
524841	2004 AY_{23}	—	January 15, 2004	Kitt Peak	Spacewatch	·	2.2 km	MPC · JPL
524842	2004 AH_{24}	—	January 15, 2004	Kitt Peak	Spacewatch	·	2.5 km	MPC · JPL
524843	2004 BR_{24}	—	January 19, 2004	Kitt Peak	Spacewatch	·	1.8 km	MPC · JPL
524844	2004 BW_{24}	—	January 19, 2004	Kitt Peak	Spacewatch	EOS	2.2 km	MPC · JPL
524845	2004 BC_{61}	—	December 21, 2003	Kitt Peak	Spacewatch	·	2.6 km	MPC · JPL
524846	2004 BA_{68}	—	December 27, 2003	Socorro	LINEAR	H	570 m	MPC · JPL
524847	2004 BB_{100}	—	January 19, 2004	Kitt Peak	Spacewatch	·	1.9 km	MPC · JPL
524848	2004 BT_{100}	—	January 28, 2004	Kitt Peak	Spacewatch	·	1.1 km	MPC · JPL
524849	2004 BG_{127}	—	January 16, 2004	Kitt Peak	Spacewatch	·	1.7 km	MPC · JPL
524850	2004 BQ_{130}	—	January 16, 2004	Kitt Peak	Spacewatch	3:2	6.1 km	MPC · JPL
524851	2004 BY_{131}	—	January 16, 2004	Kitt Peak	Spacewatch	·	2.4 km	MPC · JPL
524852	2004 BY_{135}	—	January 19, 2004	Kitt Peak	Spacewatch	·	2.2 km	MPC · JPL
524853	2004 BP_{136}	—	January 19, 2004	Kitt Peak	Spacewatch	V	530 m	MPC · JPL
524854	2004 BX_{136}	—	January 19, 2004	Kitt Peak	Spacewatch	·	1.8 km	MPC · JPL
524855	2004 BC_{144}	—	January 19, 2004	Kitt Peak	Spacewatch	·	1.7 km	MPC · JPL
524856	2004 BS_{153}	—	January 27, 2004	Kitt Peak	Spacewatch	·	1.9 km	MPC · JPL
524857	2004 BO_{163}	—	August 17, 2006	Palomar	NEAT	·	2.4 km	MPC · JPL
524858	2004 BU_{163}	—	March 25, 2015	Haleakala	Pan-STARRS 1	·	1.6 km	MPC · JPL
524859	2004 CE_{16}	—	February 11, 2004	Kitt Peak	Spacewatch	·	1.7 km	MPC · JPL
524860	2004 CH_{16}	—	February 11, 2004	Kitt Peak	Spacewatch	EOS	1.4 km	MPC · JPL
524861	2004 CS_{16}	—	January 22, 2004	Socorro	LINEAR	3:2	4.8 km	MPC · JPL
524862	2004 CX_{25}	—	February 11, 2004	Kitt Peak	Spacewatch	·	1.4 km	MPC · JPL
524863	2004 CZ_{30}	—	January 19, 2004	Kitt Peak	Spacewatch	·	3.2 km	MPC · JPL
524864	2004 CS_{32}	—	January 30, 2004	Kitt Peak	Spacewatch	·	2.1 km	MPC · JPL
524865	2004 CB_{34}	—	February 12, 2004	Kitt Peak	Spacewatch	·	930 m	MPC · JPL
524866	2004 CX_{46}	—	February 13, 2004	Kitt Peak	Spacewatch	·	3.1 km	MPC · JPL
524867	2004 CC_{47}	—	February 13, 2004	Kitt Peak	Spacewatch	·	1.0 km	MPC · JPL
524868	2004 CN_{52}	—	February 12, 2004	Desert Eagle	W. K. Y. Yeung	H	440 m	MPC · JPL
524869	2004 CW_{87}	—	February 11, 2004	Kitt Peak	Spacewatch	·	1.5 km	MPC · JPL
524870	2004 CV_{89}	—	October 23, 1995	Kitt Peak	Spacewatch	·	1.1 km	MPC · JPL
524871	2004 CH_{116}	—	February 11, 2004	Kitt Peak	Spacewatch	MAS	480 m	MPC · JPL
524872	2004 CN_{121}	—	February 12, 2004	Kitt Peak	Spacewatch	·	2.1 km	MPC · JPL
524873	2004 DA_{1}	—	February 17, 2004	Socorro	LINEAR	H	450 m	MPC · JPL
524874	2004 DZ_{5}	—	February 16, 2004	Kitt Peak	Spacewatch	·	950 m	MPC · JPL
524875	2004 DP_{17}	—	February 18, 2004	Kitt Peak	Spacewatch	·	2.4 km	MPC · JPL
524876	2004 DE_{19}	—	February 16, 2004	Kitt Peak	Spacewatch	·	1.4 km	MPC · JPL
524877	2004 DP_{30}	—	February 17, 2004	Socorro	LINEAR	·	2.6 km	MPC · JPL
524878	2004 DG_{74}	—	February 17, 2004	Kitt Peak	Spacewatch	·	1.9 km	MPC · JPL
524879	2004 DH_{74}	—	February 17, 2004	Kitt Peak	Spacewatch	·	1.9 km	MPC · JPL
524880	2004 DM_{77}	—	February 16, 2004	Calvin-Rehoboth	L. A. Molnar	·	870 m	MPC · JPL
524881	2004 ES_{22}	—	August 21, 2001	Kitt Peak	Spacewatch	·	1.9 km	MPC · JPL
524882	2004 EQ_{23}	—	March 15, 2004	Socorro	LINEAR	·	910 m	MPC · JPL
524883	2004 ED_{29}	—	February 14, 2004	Palomar	NEAT	·	4.4 km	MPC · JPL
524884	2004 EP_{42}	—	March 15, 2004	Socorro	LINEAR	H	520 m	MPC · JPL
524885	2004 ED_{67}	—	March 15, 2004	Kitt Peak	Spacewatch	NYS	1.2 km	MPC · JPL
524886	2004 EX_{97}	—	March 15, 2004	Kitt Peak	Spacewatch	·	1.2 km	MPC · JPL
524887	2004 EC_{99}	—	March 15, 2004	Kitt Peak	Spacewatch	·	1.2 km	MPC · JPL
524888	2004 EN_{102}	—	October 7, 1996	Kitt Peak	Spacewatch	·	2.0 km	MPC · JPL
524889	2004 EQ_{102}	—	February 13, 2004	Kitt Peak	Spacewatch	·	2.9 km	MPC · JPL
524890	2004 ER_{103}	—	March 15, 2004	Kitt Peak	Spacewatch	·	2.8 km	MPC · JPL
524891	2004 EA_{107}	—	March 15, 2004	Kitt Peak	Spacewatch	MAS	570 m	MPC · JPL
524892	2004 EZ_{107}	—	March 15, 2004	Kitt Peak	Spacewatch	·	1.7 km	MPC · JPL
524893	2004 EN_{108}	—	August 24, 2001	Kitt Peak	Spacewatch	·	1.7 km	MPC · JPL
524894	2004 EM_{109}	—	March 15, 2004	Kitt Peak	Spacewatch	·	1.3 km	MPC · JPL
524895	2004 FT_{10}	—	February 11, 2004	Kitt Peak	Spacewatch	·	4.1 km	MPC · JPL
524896	2004 FF_{21}	—	March 15, 2004	Catalina	CSS	·	1.1 km	MPC · JPL
524897	2004 FX_{21}	—	March 16, 2004	Kitt Peak	Spacewatch	(5)	1.1 km	MPC · JPL
524898	2004 FE_{28}	—	March 17, 2004	Siding Spring	SSS	·	2.1 km	MPC · JPL
524899	2004 FF_{28}	—	March 18, 2004	Kitt Peak	Spacewatch	·	1.9 km	MPC · JPL
524900	2004 FB_{32}	—	March 30, 2004	Socorro	LINEAR	·	1.6 km	MPC · JPL

== 524901–525000 ==
back to top

Designation			Discovery			Properties		Ref
Permanent	Provisional	Named after	Date	Site	Discoverer(s)	Category	Diam.	Ref
524901	2004 FG_{40}	—	March 18, 2004	Socorro	LINEAR	EUP	5.5 km	MPC · JPL
524902	2004 FQ_{41}	—	March 18, 2004	Kitt Peak	Spacewatch	·	720 m	MPC · JPL
524903	2004 FN_{47}	—	March 18, 2004	Kitt Peak	Spacewatch	BRA	1.6 km	MPC · JPL
524904	2004 FQ_{53}	—	February 29, 2004	Kitt Peak	Spacewatch	·	3.3 km	MPC · JPL
524905	2004 FX_{53}	—	March 17, 2004	Kitt Peak	Spacewatch	·	1.8 km	MPC · JPL
524906	2004 FM_{59}	—	March 18, 2004	Socorro	LINEAR	·	1.5 km	MPC · JPL
524907	2004 FW_{70}	—	March 17, 2004	Kitt Peak	Spacewatch	·	3.3 km	MPC · JPL
524908	2004 FC_{72}	—	March 17, 2004	Kitt Peak	Spacewatch	·	960 m	MPC · JPL
524909	2004 FN_{72}	—	March 17, 2004	Kitt Peak	Spacewatch	·	2.1 km	MPC · JPL
524910	2004 FV_{74}	—	March 17, 2004	Kitt Peak	Spacewatch	·	1.1 km	MPC · JPL
524911	2004 FL_{78}	—	March 19, 2004	Kitt Peak	Spacewatch	·	2.5 km	MPC · JPL
524912	2004 FM_{78}	—	March 19, 2004	Kitt Peak	Spacewatch	·	1.8 km	MPC · JPL
524913	2004 FO_{79}	—	March 20, 2004	Socorro	LINEAR	PHO	860 m	MPC · JPL
524914	2004 FT_{82}	—	February 29, 2004	Kitt Peak	Spacewatch	·	1.2 km	MPC · JPL
524915	2004 FR_{94}	—	March 18, 2004	Catalina	CSS	·	3.3 km	MPC · JPL
524916	2004 FU_{114}	—	March 21, 2004	Kitt Peak	Spacewatch	VER	2.7 km	MPC · JPL
524917	2004 FH_{118}	—	March 22, 2004	Socorro	LINEAR	·	1.9 km	MPC · JPL
524918	2004 FC_{123}	—	March 26, 2004	Kitt Peak	Spacewatch	·	1.0 km	MPC · JPL
524919	2004 FA_{133}	—	March 23, 2004	Socorro	LINEAR	·	1.4 km	MPC · JPL
524920	2004 FX_{151}	—	March 17, 2004	Kitt Peak	Spacewatch	·	2.0 km	MPC · JPL
524921	2004 FJ_{156}	—	March 17, 2004	Kitt Peak	Spacewatch	·	2.9 km	MPC · JPL
524922	2004 FL_{158}	—	March 17, 2004	Kitt Peak	Spacewatch	NYS	910 m	MPC · JPL
524923	2004 GN_{7}	—	April 12, 2004	Kitt Peak	Spacewatch	V	590 m	MPC · JPL
524924	2004 GV_{7}	—	March 27, 2004	Socorro	LINEAR	H	580 m	MPC · JPL
524925	2004 GP_{34}	—	March 16, 2004	Kitt Peak	Spacewatch	NYS	1.1 km	MPC · JPL
524926	2004 GS_{51}	—	April 13, 2004	Kitt Peak	Spacewatch	MAS	640 m	MPC · JPL
524927	2004 GD_{54}	—	April 13, 2004	Kitt Peak	Spacewatch	V	460 m	MPC · JPL
524928	2004 GX_{54}	—	April 13, 2004	Kitt Peak	Spacewatch	·	660 m	MPC · JPL
524929	2004 GH_{56}	—	April 13, 2004	Kitt Peak	Spacewatch	·	3.6 km	MPC · JPL
524930	2004 GN_{61}	—	April 13, 2004	Kitt Peak	Spacewatch	·	2.8 km	MPC · JPL
524931	2004 GO_{62}	—	April 13, 2004	Kitt Peak	Spacewatch	·	810 m	MPC · JPL
524932	2004 GK_{66}	—	April 13, 2004	Kitt Peak	Spacewatch	·	1 km	MPC · JPL
524933	2004 GC_{67}	—	April 13, 2004	Kitt Peak	Spacewatch	HNS	1 km	MPC · JPL
524934	2004 GR_{70}	—	April 13, 2004	Kitt Peak	Spacewatch	·	2.0 km	MPC · JPL
524935	2004 GA_{77}	—	April 14, 2004	Catalina	CSS	·	2.9 km	MPC · JPL
524936	2004 GW_{79}	—	April 12, 2004	Kitt Peak	Spacewatch	·	1.1 km	MPC · JPL
524937	2004 HN_{8}	—	April 16, 2004	Socorro	LINEAR	·	1.7 km	MPC · JPL
524938	2004 HO_{19}	—	March 27, 2004	Socorro	LINEAR	·	1.2 km	MPC · JPL
524939	2004 HA_{21}	—	November 14, 2001	Kitt Peak	Spacewatch	EOS	2.3 km	MPC · JPL
524940	2004 HP_{22}	—	April 16, 2004	Kitt Peak	Spacewatch	·	1.1 km	MPC · JPL
524941	2004 HB_{24}	—	April 16, 2004	Kitt Peak	Spacewatch	EOS	2.0 km	MPC · JPL
524942	2004 HR_{26}	—	April 20, 2004	Kitt Peak	Spacewatch	·	1.5 km	MPC · JPL
524943	2004 HY_{26}	—	April 20, 2004	Kitt Peak	Spacewatch	·	740 m	MPC · JPL
524944	2004 HB_{32}	—	October 20, 1995	Kitt Peak	Spacewatch	·	710 m	MPC · JPL
524945	2004 HE_{35}	—	April 19, 2004	Kitt Peak	Spacewatch	·	2.0 km	MPC · JPL
524946	2004 HL_{46}	—	March 23, 2004	Kitt Peak	Spacewatch	·	2.1 km	MPC · JPL
524947	2004 HR_{47}	—	April 22, 2004	Kitt Peak	Spacewatch	·	4.2 km	MPC · JPL
524948	2004 HG_{57}	—	April 21, 2004	Kitt Peak	Spacewatch	·	1.4 km	MPC · JPL
524949	2004 HR_{74}	—	May 10, 2000	Prescott	P. G. Comba	HNS	1.3 km	MPC · JPL
524950	2004 JZ	—	May 9, 2004	Kitt Peak	Spacewatch	·	1.7 km	MPC · JPL
524951	2004 JT_{25}	—	May 15, 2004	Socorro	LINEAR	·	1.4 km	MPC · JPL
524952	2004 JQ_{31}	—	May 15, 2004	Campo Imperatore	CINEOS	·	1.8 km	MPC · JPL
524953	2004 JF_{38}	—	April 25, 2004	Kitt Peak	Spacewatch	·	3.2 km	MPC · JPL
524954	2004 JO_{39}	—	May 14, 2004	Kitt Peak	Spacewatch	·	3.4 km	MPC · JPL
524955	2004 JG_{48}	—	May 13, 2004	Kitt Peak	Spacewatch	·	2.6 km	MPC · JPL
524956	2004 JS_{54}	—	May 9, 2004	Kitt Peak	Spacewatch	PHO	960 m	MPC · JPL
524957	2004 JY_{55}	—	March 25, 2000	Prescott	P. G. Comba	·	1.3 km	MPC · JPL
524958	2004 KF_{7}	—	March 25, 2000	Kitt Peak	Spacewatch	MAS	700 m	MPC · JPL
524959	2004 KJ_{12}	—	May 9, 2004	Kitt Peak	Spacewatch	·	1.9 km	MPC · JPL
524960	2004 KN_{16}	—	May 27, 2004	Kitt Peak	Spacewatch	·	3.3 km	MPC · JPL
524961	2004 LP_{11}	—	June 14, 2004	Socorro	LINEAR	NYS	1.1 km	MPC · JPL
524962	2004 LS_{14}	—	June 11, 2004	Kitt Peak	Spacewatch	·	2.4 km	MPC · JPL
524963	2004 LH_{23}	—	June 15, 2004	Socorro	LINEAR	H	630 m	MPC · JPL
524964	2004 LK_{23}	—	June 15, 2004	Socorro	LINEAR	·	1.5 km	MPC · JPL
524965	2004 MN_{6}	—	June 21, 2004	Socorro	LINEAR	·	3.6 km	MPC · JPL
524966	2004 NS_{13}	—	July 11, 2004	Socorro	LINEAR	BRG	1.6 km	MPC · JPL
524967	2004 NW_{13}	—	July 11, 2004	Socorro	LINEAR	·	1.7 km	MPC · JPL
524968	2004 NZ_{19}	—	July 14, 2004	Socorro	LINEAR	·	640 m	MPC · JPL
524969	2004 NB_{24}	—	July 14, 2004	Socorro	LINEAR	·	1.9 km	MPC · JPL
524970	2004 NX_{25}	—	July 11, 2004	Socorro	LINEAR	EUN	1.3 km	MPC · JPL
524971	2004 NE_{30}	—	July 15, 2004	Siding Spring	SSS	·	1.5 km	MPC · JPL
524972	2004 PV_{18}	—	August 8, 2004	Anderson Mesa	LONEOS	H	560 m	MPC · JPL
524973	2004 PY_{22}	—	August 8, 2004	Socorro	LINEAR	ADE	1.8 km	MPC · JPL
524974	2004 PX_{27}	—	August 10, 2004	Siding Spring	SSS	AMO	740 m	MPC · JPL
524975	2004 PY_{30}	—	August 8, 2004	Socorro	LINEAR	·	660 m	MPC · JPL
524976	2004 PD_{41}	—	August 9, 2004	Siding Spring	SSS	·	1.9 km	MPC · JPL
524977	2004 PJ_{41}	—	July 17, 2004	Socorro	LINEAR	H	520 m	MPC · JPL
524978	2004 PF_{42}	—	August 9, 2004	Socorro	LINEAR	·	2.5 km	MPC · JPL
524979	2004 PU_{48}	—	August 8, 2004	Socorro	LINEAR	·	2.3 km	MPC · JPL
524980	2004 PA_{55}	—	August 8, 2004	Anderson Mesa	LONEOS	·	1.6 km	MPC · JPL
524981	2004 PM_{57}	—	August 9, 2004	Socorro	LINEAR	·	1.8 km	MPC · JPL
524982	2004 PH_{65}	—	August 10, 2004	Socorro	LINEAR	·	2.4 km	MPC · JPL
524983	2004 PF_{70}	—	July 13, 2004	Siding Spring	SSS	·	1.0 km	MPC · JPL
524984	2004 PP_{72}	—	August 8, 2004	Socorro	LINEAR	·	900 m	MPC · JPL
524985	2004 PA_{76}	—	August 9, 2004	Socorro	LINEAR	THB	3.2 km	MPC · JPL
524986	2004 PH_{78}	—	August 9, 2004	Socorro	LINEAR	·	2.8 km	MPC · JPL
524987	2004 PH_{84}	—	August 10, 2004	Socorro	LINEAR	·	1.5 km	MPC · JPL
524988	2004 PV_{102}	—	August 12, 2004	Socorro	LINEAR	·	2.0 km	MPC · JPL
524989	2004 PF_{110}	—	July 21, 2004	Siding Spring	SSS	·	1.7 km	MPC · JPL
524990	2004 PP_{111}	—	August 11, 2004	Socorro	LINEAR	·	650 m	MPC · JPL
524991	2004 PL_{113}	—	August 8, 2004	Socorro	LINEAR	·	4.0 km	MPC · JPL
524992	2004 QH_{2}	—	August 19, 2004	Reedy Creek	J. Broughton	·	2.1 km	MPC · JPL
524993	2004 QW_{5}	—	August 20, 2004	Kitt Peak	Spacewatch	·	650 m	MPC · JPL
524994	2004 QL_{29}	—	August 21, 2004	Siding Spring	SSS	·	1.8 km	MPC · JPL
524995	2004 RS_{15}	—	August 11, 2004	Socorro	LINEAR	·	1.7 km	MPC · JPL
524996	2004 RE_{17}	—	September 7, 2004	Kitt Peak	Spacewatch	·	580 m	MPC · JPL
524997	2004 RG_{20}	—	September 7, 2004	Kitt Peak	Spacewatch	·	1.3 km	MPC · JPL
524998	2004 RN_{24}	—	September 8, 2004	Socorro	LINEAR	H	380 m	MPC · JPL
524999	2004 RO_{45}	—	September 8, 2004	Socorro	LINEAR	·	1.8 km	MPC · JPL
525000	2004 RJ_{55}	—	September 8, 2004	Socorro	LINEAR	·	1.9 km	MPC · JPL

back to top

== Meaning of names ==
As minor planet discoveries are confirmed, they are given a permanent number by the IAU's Minor Planet Center (MPC), and the discoverers can then submit names for them, following the IAU's naming conventions. The list below concerns those minor planets in the specified number-range that have received names, and explains the meanings of those names.

Official naming citations of newly named small Solar System bodies are approved and published in a bulletin by IAU's Working Group for Small Bodies Nomenclature (WGSBN). Before May 2021, citations were published in MPC's Minor Planet Circulars for many decades. Recent citations can also be found on the JPL Small-Body Database (SBDB). Until his death in 2016, German astronomer Lutz D. Schmadel compiled these citations into the Dictionary of Minor Planet Names (DMP) and regularly updated the collection.

Based on Paul Herget's The Names of the Minor Planets, Schmadel also researched the unclear origin of numerous asteroids, most of which had been named prior to World War II. This article incorporates text from this source, which is in the public domain: SBDB New namings may only be added to this list below after official publication as the preannouncement of names is condemned. The WGSBN publishes a comprehensive guideline for the naming rules of non-cometary small Solar System bodies.

Named minor planet	Provisional	This minor planet was named for...	Ref · Catalog
524522 Zoozve	2002 VE_{68}	Mislabeling of the asteroid's provisional designation "2002VE" by artist Alex Foster, who included it on a children's solar system poster. Noticed and popularized by Radiolab podcast co-host Latif Nasser.	IAU · 524522
524607 Davecarter	2003 QB_{89}	David B. Carter (born 1952) retired after nearly 40 years of service as an Electronics Technician and CCD expert at the South African Astronomical Observatory. His work included support of the telescopes and facilities in Sutherland, as well as building new instruments (including for the Southern African Large Telescope).	JPL · 524607
524638 Kaffkamargit	2003 SC_{158}	Margit Kaffka was a Hungarian poet and novelist.	IAU · 524638
