= Latif Nasser =

Canadian-American radio and television host

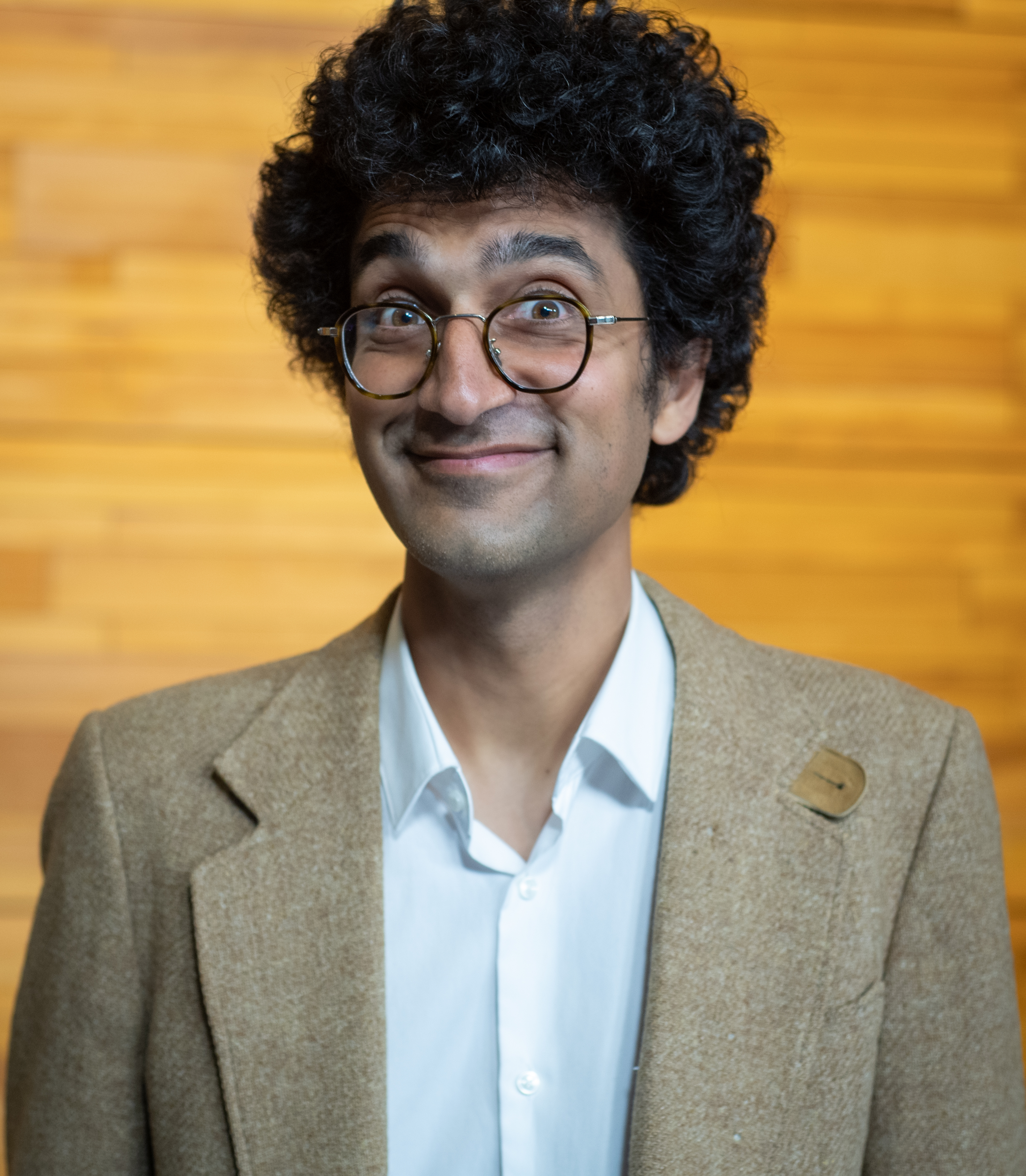
- Latif Nasser at TED 2025
- Born: July 20, 1985 (age 41); Mississauga, Ontario, Canada
- Spouse: Carly Mensch

Academic background
- Education: Harvard University; Dartmouth College; Pearson College UWC
- Thesis: Spasms of the Soul: The Tanganyika Laughter Epidemic in the Age of Independence. (2014)
- Website: www.latifnasser.com

Latif Abdul Nasser (/ˈlɑːtɪf/ LAH-tif; born July 20, 1985) is a Canadian-American researcher, writer and presenter. He is the Director of Research and co-host at Radiolab and host of the Netflix show Connected.

== Early life and education ==
Nasser was born to an Indian-Tanzanian Muslim family and grew up in Mississauga, Ontario. He attended Pearson College UWC. Nasser earned his undergraduate degree at Dartmouth College. He served as President of the Displaced Theatre Company and spent most of his time in the Hopkins Center for the Arts. While at Dartmouth he studied the history of physics with Richard Kremer and Marcelo Gleiser. As part of the class he was involved in a production of Bertolt Brecht's Life of Galileo. When trying to find props for the production, he found himself in the scientific instrument collection of Dartmouth, unearthing historic artefacts and researching their origins. Nasser was selected by his classmates to be the orator at the 2008 Class Day. He studied in Fez, Morocco for a study program with Dartmouth.

Nasser received a PhD from the Department of the History of Science at Harvard University in 2014. His dissertation was on the Tanganyika laughter epidemic.

== Career ==
After earning his doctorate, Nasser was made co-host of the WNYC Studios radio show Radiolab. He created and hosted the podcast The Other Latif, an investigative series in which Nasser explored the story of Guantanamo Bay detention detainee Abdul Latif Nasir. Following the retirement of Jad Abumrad in January 2022, Nasser became the new co-host of Radiolab together with producer Lulu Miller.

Beginning in 2020 Nasser hosts the Netflix docuseries Connected, which explores how humans are connected to each other and the universe. In the series Nasser visits scientists around the world, learning about what they do and their research impacts people's lives.

== Personal life ==
Nasser is married to fellow Dartmouth College alumna Carly Mensch. The couple had a child in August 2020. He is a dual citizen of Canada and the United States.
