= Connectivity =

Connectivity may refer to:

== Computing and technology ==
- Connectivity (media), the ability of the social media to accumulate economic capital from the users connections and activities
- Internet connectivity, the means by which individual terminals, computers, mobile devices, and local area networks connect to the global Internet
- Pixel connectivity, the way in which pixels in 2-dimensional images relate to their neighbors.

== Mathematics ==
- Connectivity (graph theory), a property of a graph.
- The property of being a connected space in topology.
- Homotopical connectivity, a property related to the dimensions of holes in a topological space, and to its homotopy groups.
- Homological connectivity, a property related to the homology groups of a topological space.

== Biology ==
=== Neurobiology ===
- Homotopic connectivity - connectivity between mirror areas of the human brain hemispheres.
- Brain connectivity
- Functional connectivity
- Dynamic functional connectivity

=== Ecology ===
- Landscape connectivity, the degree to which the landscape facilitates or impedes movement among resource patches.
- Permeability (spatial and transport planning), the extent to which urban forms permit (or restrict) movement of people or vehicles in different directions.

== Physics ==
- Connectivity, a parameter describing the topology of a porous medium.

== See also ==
- Connection (disambiguation)
- Prayer, connection to the Divine.
