= Connect =

Connect may refer to:

== Music ==
=== Albums ===
- Connect (Sick Puppies album), 2013
- Connect (Charles Tolliver album), 2020
- Connect, album by Mark Farina
- Tha Connect, a 2009 album by Willy Northpole
- Connect, a 2009 album by Dave Schulz (musician)
- Connect Sets (disambiguation), several album series

=== Songs ===
- "Connect" (song), a 2011 song by ClariS
- "Connect", a song by Sick Puppies from their 2013 album Connect
- "Connect", song by Drake from the 2013 album Nothing Was the Same
- "Connect", a song by Vampire Weekend from their 2024 album Only God Was Above Us

=== Other music ===
- Connect Music Festival, a music festival in Inveraray, Scotland
- Sony Connect, an online music store

== Other entertainment ==
- Connect, a matching game similar to dominoes, also known as Rivers, Roads & Rails
- Connect (sculpture), a public art work by Jeremy Wolf installed Milwaukee, Wisconsin, United States
- Connect (2019 film), a Scottish film
- Connect (2022 film), a Tamil horror thriller film
- Connect with Mark Kelley, a Canadian news talk show
- Connect (TV series), South Korean TV series
- Connect, the pre-launch name of a Canadian TV channel that became MTV

== Cars ==
- Connect (Alfa Romeo), control system
- Ford Tourneo Connect, a vehicle manufactured in the UK by Ford
- Ford Transit Connect, a vehicle manufactured in the UK by Ford

== Computing and technology ==
- Connect (computer system), HMRC data mining database system (UK)
- CONNECT (HTTP), the request method of the Hypertext Transfer Protocol
- Communications, Navigation, and Networking reConfigurable Testbed (CoNNeCT), a testbed for the Space Communications and Navigation Program (SCaN) program on the International Space Station
- CONNECT string, a Hayes modem command and response
- McGraw-Hill Connect, a web-based assignment and assessment platform that helps educators connect students to their coursework

== Organizations ==
- Connect (financial services company), a consumer credit reporting agency in the United States
- Connect (Irish trade union), a union for construction and technical workers in Ireland
- Connect (organization), an independent non-profit organization servicing the San Diego region with offices in San Diego and Washington, D.C.
- Connect (UK trade union), a union for technology workers in the United Kingdom
- Connect (users group), the worldwide users group for Hewlett-Packard
- Connect (insurance company), an American insurance company
- Directorate-General for Communications Networks, Content and Technology, or Connect, a department of the European Commission

== Other uses ==
- Connect (horse), a grade 1 winning thoroughbred
- Connect (studio), a Japanese anime studio

== See also ==
- Kinect, a motion-sensing controller for video games
- Only Connect, a British BBC TV quiz show, first aired in 2008
- Connection
