= Richard Kremer =

Canadian clinician/scientist

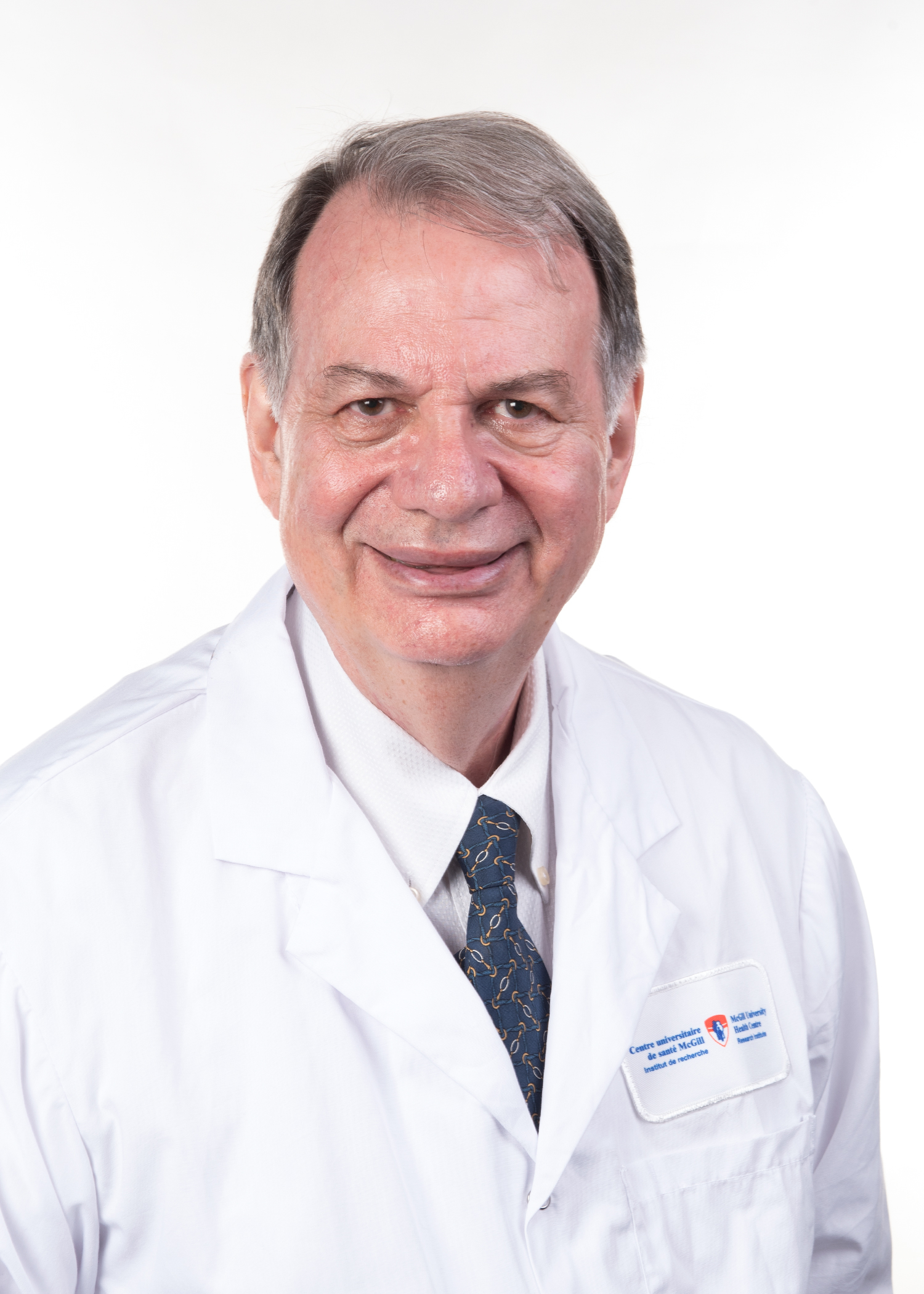

Richard Kremer FRCPC is a physician-scientist who specializes in Endocrinology and Laboratory Medicine. Kremer is professor of medicine at McGill University in Montreal, Quebec, Canada. He is also a Senior Scientist at the Research Institute of the McGill University Health Centre at its Centre for Translational Biology. Kremer is also Director of the Bone and Mineral Unit (McGill Department of Medicine) and Academic Director (McGill Division of Medical Biochemistry Centre for Bone and Periodontal Research) at the McGill University Health Centre. and past Co-Director of the Musculoskeletal Axis. Kremer is a full member of the Canadian Institutes of Health Research's (CIHR) College of Reviewers.

== Education ==
Kremer was born in Paris, France, and received his MD and PhD degrees at the Pierre et Marie Curie University of Paris. He then completed his internal medicine and endocrinology residency Pitié-Salpêtrière Hospital in Paris. Kremer later moved to Canada where he completed further residency training in Endocrinology and Laboratory Medicine at the Montreal General, Royal Victoria, and Ottawa Civic Hospitals. He would go on to pursue his research training at the Royal Victoria Hospital where he joined as a full-time physician in 1989.

== Research work ==
=== Research on the Parathyroid Hormone-Related Protein (PTHrP) ===
Kremer was credited for creating the antibodies that blocked the Parathyroid Hormone-Related Protein (PTHrP) in a widely reported study on Pancreatic Cancer. Kremer previously discovered PTHrP's initiating role in Breast Cancer and its progression which could also be blocked by anti-PTHrP antibodies as was reported in 2011. Kremer's research on PTHrP has been impactful and he is considered a top 10 researcher in the field worldwide, having been ranked number 3 worldwide in scholarly output between 2016 and 2021 in the same field.

=== Research on bone ===
Kremer and colleagues reported that women who use oral bisphosphonates to prevent osteoporosis may also be at lower risk of skeletal complications of breast cancer. Kremer was also part of the Canadian Institute of Health Research's (CIHR) 2009 Final Report on Bone Health.

=== Research on Vitamin D ===
Kremer has also been involved in research on vitamin D which led to the discovery of a phenomenon known as "vitamin D resistance in cancer." as a consequence of ras-induced phosphorylation of the retinoid X receptor (RXR) which disrupts its heterodimeric association with the vitamin D receptor (VDR). Kremer and his colleague Vicente Gilsanz were the first to report the clear link between vitamin D levels and accumulation of fat in muscle tissue in 2010, which was widely reported as a ground-breaking study. This study by Kremer and colleagues showed the inverse relationship between vitamin D and fat, which demonstrated that people with more fat were also likely to be vitamin D deficient.

On a similar line of inquiry, earlier studies by Kremer and colleagues demonstrated the link between a lack of vitamin D and weight gain and stunted growth in girls.

== Editorial boards ==
Kremer is an associate editor of Frontiers in Bone Research and has made editorial contributions for Frontiers in Endocrinology. He is also an associate editor of the Journal of Osteoporosis and on the editorial boards of the Journal of Osteoporosis and Physical Activity, World Journal of Orthopedics, and the American Journal of Cancer Research.

== Honours and awards ==
Kremer received the Chercheur Boursier National award from the Fond de la Recherche en Sante du Quebec in 2007 and the Catherine Coyne Memorial Fellowship Award in 2017. He was nominated as a Fellow of the Royal Society of Medicine and the CIHR College of Reviewers in 2017. In 2019, Kremer was made a fellow of the Royal College of Physicians and Surgeons of Canada. In 2021, Kremer was recognized by the American Association for Cancer Research (AACR) as a long term member (25+ years), having been a member for 29 years.
