= Connected (2020 TV series) =

2020 documentary television series

- Also known as: Connected: The Hidden Science of Everything
- Genre: Documentary
- Presented by: Latif Nasser
- Composer: Kishi Bashi
- Country of origin: United States
- Original language: English
- No. of seasons: 1
- No. of episodes: 6

Production
- Executive producers: Christopher Collins; Lydia Tenaglia; Erik Osterholm; Latif Nasser; David Mettler
- Cinematography: Jeremy Leach; Peter Alton; Rick Smith; Omar Mullick; Christopher Gill; Steve Pitre
- Editors: Michelle Kim; Jonathan Cianfrani; Chris Aiola; Andrew Ford; Derek Pons
- Running time: 39–49 minutes
- Production company: Zero Point Zero Production Inc.

Original release
- Network: Netflix
- Release: August 2, 2020

Connected: The Hidden Science of Everything is a 2020 docuseries where journalist Latif Nasser is investigating ways in which we are connected to each other and the universe.

== Host ==
- Latif Nasser, the director of research at the award-winning New York Public Radio show Radiolab

== Episodes ==
| No. | Title | Directed by | Original release date |
|---|---|---|---|
| 1 | "Surveillance" | Arianna LaPenne | August 2, 2020 |
| 2 | "Poop" | Arianna LaPenne | August 2, 2020 |
| 3 | "Dust" | Alyse Walsh | August 2, 2020 |
| 4 | "Digits" | Nick Brigden | August 2, 2020 |
| 5 | "Clouds" | Alyse Walsh | August 2, 2020 |
| 6 | "Nukes" | Nick Brigden | August 2, 2020 |

== Release ==
Connected: The Hidden Science of Everything was released on August 2, 2020, on Netflix.
