= Connect (sculpture) =

Public art work by Jeremy Wolf

- Artist: Jeremy Wolf
- Year: 2005
- Type: Bronze sculpture
- Dimensions: 150 cm × 97 cm × 97 cm (60 in × 38 in × 38 in)
- Location: Riverside Park, Milwaukee, Wisconsin, U.S.; 43°4′8.572″N 87°53′17.781″W
- Owner: Urban Ecology Center

Connect is a public art work by artist Jeremy Wolf. It is installed in Riverside Park on the east side of Milwaukee, Wisconsin, United States.

== Description ==
Connect is an anthropomorphic bronze sculpture depicting a life-sized raccoon holding a fish with its two hands. One of its back feet is raised. While the animal's fur, tail and head closely mimic a raccoon's actual features, its feet, forearms and hands have a human quality. The base on which the raccoon sits is embossed with woodland imagery like trees, insects and a salamander.

== Commission process ==
Connect was selected by a committee assembled by the Urban Ecology Center. Four artists—Susan Falkman, Peter Flanary, Richard Taylor and Jeremy Wolf—presented their concepts and fielded questions at an open meeting held at Riverside University High School in November 2003.
