= Homotopic connectivity =

In biology, homotopic connectivity is the connectivity between mirror areas of the human brain hemispheres.

Changes in the homotopic connectivity occur in disorders such as melancholic depression, major depressive disorder, schizophrenia and cortical seizures.
