= Connect Sets =

Connect Set or Connect Sets may refer to:

- Sony Connect, the organisation behind the recording of the Connect Sets
- Connect Sets (Phantom Planet EP)
- Connect Sets (4th Avenue Jones EP)
- Connect Sets (The Decemberists EP)
- Connect Sets (Mae EP), by Mae
