= Reconnected =

Reconnected may refer to:

- ReConnected, a British vocal group
- "Reconnected" (song), the seventh track of the 2010 Jessica Mauboy album, Get 'Em Girls
- Reconnected Live, a 2010 live album by Yazoo, recorded during the band's Reconnected Tour

== See also ==
- Connected (disambiguation)
