= Conexión =

Conexión (plural: conexiones) or variants may refer to:

- Conexión (band), Spanish band active 1969-1974
- Conexión (María José album), 2019
- Conexión, album by Conexión (band) 1971
- Conexión, album by Todo Mundo (band) 2013
- Conexión, live album by Ana Torroja 2015
- Conexión, album by Fonseca (singer) 2015
- Conexión, album by Chicuelo (guitarist) and pianist Marco Mezquida 2017
- La Conexión, 1996 album by German salsa band Conexión Latina
- La Conexión, 2013 album by Black Guayaba, nominated for a Latin Grammy in the Best Pop/Rock Album category
- La Conexión, 2005 mixtape by girl group Nina Sky

== See also ==
- Connexion (disambiguation)
