= Connecting (disambiguation) =

Connecting is an American television sitcom.

Connecting may also refer to:

- Connecting, a book by Larry Crabb
- Connecting Railway, a subsidiary of Pennsylvania Railroad

== See also ==
- Connect (disambiguation)
- Connector (disambiguation)
- Connection (disambiguation)
- Connective (disambiguation)
