= Floral morphology =

Study of flower structures

Diagram of flower parts

In botany, floral morphology is the study of the diversity of forms and structures presented by the flower, which, by definition, is a branch of limited growth that bears the modified leaves responsible for reproduction and protection of the gametes, called floral pieces. (Note: Some texts consider only angiosperms to be flowering plants, as they only consider angiosperm flowers (which ancestrally possess ordered verticils or whorls of sepals, petals, stamens and carpels, and possess the ovules enclosed in the carpels) to be flowers, petals, stamens and carpels, and possess the ovules enclosed in the carpels so that they can be accessed through the stigma). Here, following the denomination of Pius Font i Quer in his Dictionary of Botany, we consider that a flower is any branch of limited growth possessing fertile leaves, so that all spermatophytes (both angiosperms and gymnosperms) possess flowers, as defined here.)

Fertile leaves, or sporophylls, carry sporangia, which produce male and female gametes and therefore are responsible for producing the next generation of plants. Sterile leaves are modified leaves whose function is to protect the fertile parts or to attract pollinators. The branch of the flower that joins the floral parts to the stem is a shaft called the peduncle, which normally dilates at the top to form the receptacle in which the various floral parts are inserted.

All spermatophytes ("seed plants") possess flowers as defined here (in a broad sense), but the internal organization of the flower is very different in the two main groups of spermatophytes: living gymnosperms and angiosperms. Gymnosperms may possess flowers that are gathered in strobili, or the flower itself may be a strobilus of fertile leaves. Conversely, a typical angiosperm flower possesses verticils or ordered whorls that, from the outside in, are composed first of sterile parts, commonly called sepals (if their main function is protective) and petals (if their main function is to attract pollinators), and then fertile parts, with reproductive function, which are composed of verticils or whorls of stamens (which carry the male gametes) and finally carpels (which enclose the female gametes).

The arrangement of the floral parts on the axis, the presence or absence of one or more floral parts, the size, the pigmentation and the relative arrangement of the floral parts are responsible for the existence of a great variety of flower types. Such diversity is particularly important in phylogenetic and taxonomic studies of angiosperms. The evolutionary interpretation of the different flower types takes into account aspects of the adaptation of floral structure, particularly those related to pollination, fruit and seed dispersal and of protection against predators of reproductive structures.

== Arrangement of the floral pieces ==
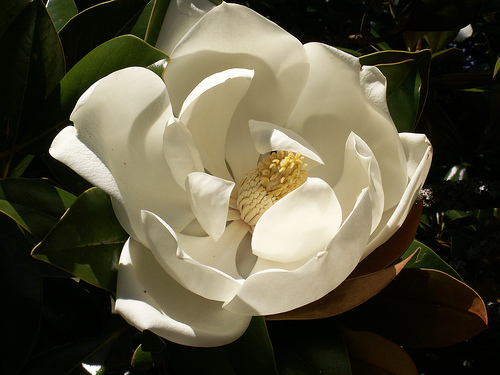
Magnolia grandiflora, a spiraled flower.

Depending on the family considered, the pieces of the flower can be arranged on the receptacle in two different ways. In a spiral arrangement, the parts are inserted consecutively and at different levels, describing a spiral on the axis in the same way as the leaves are inserted on the stem. Examples of species with spiral flowers are Magnolia grandiflora (magnoliaceae), Victoria cruziana (nymphaeaceae) and Opuntia ficus-indica (cactaceae). In a whorled, or cyclic, arrangement, the pieces are inserted at various nodes of the axis, arranged in whorls or cycles. Each floral piece of a whorl alternates with the pieces of the following whorl: for example, the petals alternate with the sepals. In these flowers, called cyclic or whorled, the number of whorls may vary, depending—again—on the family considered. Very often, flowers have four cycles (called tetracyclic), such as those of Solanum (Solanaceae), which show one cycle of sepals, one of petals, one of stamens and one of carpels. Also common are pentacyclic flowers (bearing five cycles) which have two cycles of stamens instead of only one, such as the flowers of Lilium (liliaceae). Finally, many flowers have several whorls of stamens, such as in Poncirus trifoliata (Rutaceae), in which case the flowers have more than five cycles.

== Floral symmetry ==
An object is said to have symmetry when at least one plane can be divide into two parts, so that each part is the mirror image of the other. Spiral flowers have no plane of symmetry and are said to be asymmetrical or irregular, as in the case of Liriodendron tulipifera (magnoliaceae). However, in whorled flowers, because there are repetitions of floral parts, there may be one or more planes of symmetry: they can have bilateral symmetry (i.e., a single plane of symmetry) or radial symmetry (i.e., several planes in as many mirror images). Thus, flowers can be divided into two kinds based on their symmetry. Actinomorphic flowers (also referred to as radiate or polysymmetric) have radial symmetry, as is the case in Tulipa gesneriana (liliaceae) or Linum usitatissimum (linaceae). In contrast, monosymmetrical, dorsiventral or zygomorphic flowers have bilateral symmetry and the evolution of their shape is related to the need to attract and guide pollinators to them, as in, for example, the flowers of orchids and many legumes.

== Perianth and perigonium ==
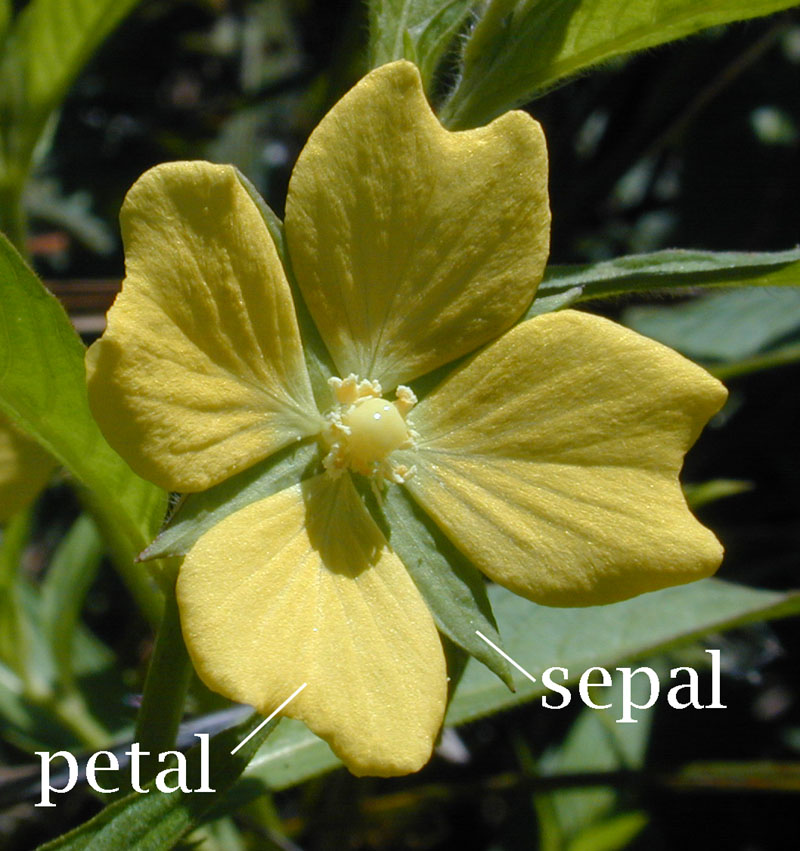
Perianth of a Primula flower, a sepal and a petal are pointed out.

The perianth is the flower structure, comprising the two sterile whorls, the calyx and the corolla. In many cases, such as in weeping willow (Salix babylonica, salicaceae) and European ash (Fraxinus excelsior, oleaceae), the perianth may be missing; The flowers have only the fertile whorls (androecium and gynoecium) and are called aperianthous, aclamyds or simply "naked" flowers. Flowers that present perianth—the most frequent case—are called perianthed, chlamydeous or "clothed".

Some perianth flowers may only present the calyx, and are thus called monoclamyds or, more usually, apetalous; the most conspicuous example of this is the urticaceae family. The absence of petals in these flowers should not lead to the assumption that they are not showy, since there are cases in which the sepals (called "petaloid sepals") acquire the consistency, shape and coloring of petals, such as the genus Clematis (buttercups).

When perianth flowers have both calyx and corolla, they are called dichlamydeous. The members of both whorls may differ from each other in shape and color and these flowers are said to be heteroclamydeous, such as the rose (Rose sp., rosaceae). When, on the other hand, the calyx and corolla parts are indistinguishable from each other in shape and color, the flower is called homochlamydeous. In this type of flowers, typical of many families of monocotyledons such as Iridaceae and Amaryllidaceae, the perianth is called perigonium and the pieces that compose it are called tepals. If the tepals resemble a petal, the perigonium is called corollaceous (from corolla) and, if they resemble sepals, the perigonium is called calyceal (from calyx).

In a bud or flower bud, the relative arrangement of the sepals or petals of each flower whorl is called vernation. This arrangement must be observed in the flower bud because, in the fully open flower, the floral parts are often so far separated from each other that the vernation cannot be determined. There are six main types of vernation. In valvar vernation, the flower pieces may touch each other at the edges without any of them being placed above or below their immediate neighbors; in contorta, each one mounts on the one following it and is overlapped by the one preceding it; in quincuncial, there are two totally external pieces, two totally internal pieces, and a fifth piece that is external at one edge and internal at the other. In imbricate vernation, there is an external piece on both edges, another, contiguous to the previous one, totally internal, and the remaining three are external on one edge and internal on the other. Vexillary vernation is a variant of the preceding one, with the totally internal piece contiguous to the external one, which occupies a superior position. Finally, in carinal vernation, the external piece of the vexillary preflowering becomes internal and one of the lower pieces becomes external. Vernation is important in the description and identification of plants, because it often characterizes the different families. For example, malvaceae have valvar vernation; gentianaceae have contorta; and, in legumes, vexillary and carinal vernation are characteristic.

=== Calyx ===
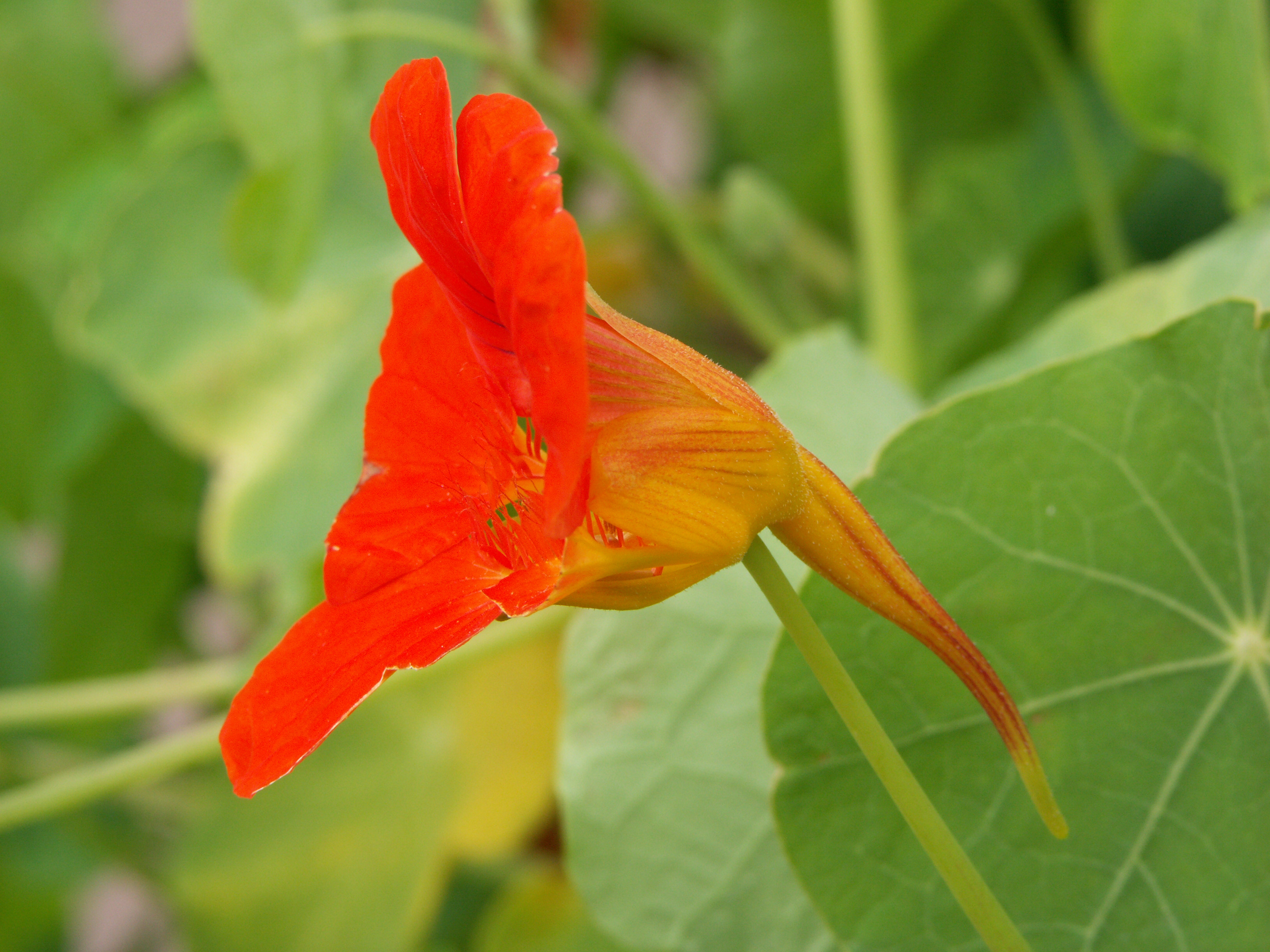
Detail of the "nectar spur" of the flower of Tropaeolum majus.

The calyx is the outermost whorl of the flower. It has a protective function and is constituted of sepals, which are usually green. If the sepals are free from each other, the calyx is called dialisepalus, and, if they are united, it is called gamosepalus. The latter can be seen in the carnation (Dianthus caryophyllus, caryophyllaceae) or the kapok (Erythrina crista-galli (legume)).

When the calyx is gamosepalous, three well-defined parts can be distinguished: the tube, which is the portion in which the sepals are united; the throat, which is the place where the sepals are separated from each other; and the limbo, which is the free portion, formed by the apical ends of each sepal or lobes.

The sepals can have varied consistency and shape. In the compositae, for example, the sepals are reduced to hairs or bristles that constitute the pappus.

Depending on its duration with respect to the other floral parts, the calyx may be ephemeral or fleeting, which is when the sepals fall when the flower opens, as in the poppy (Papaver rhoeas, Papaveraceae); deciduous, when the sepals are shed after fertilization has occurred; or persistent, when they remain after fertilization and accompanu the fruit, as in the apple tree (Malus domestica, rosaceae).

The sepals can form spurs that carry nectar (called nectar spurs) to attract pollinators, as occurs in Viola and Tropaeolum. In other species, for example, in Impatiens balsamina, some of the calyx pieces acquire the shape and coloration of petals and, for that reason, they are called petaloid.

=== Corolla ===
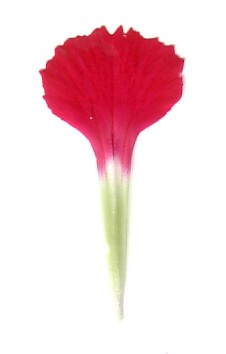
Detail of a petal of carnation (Dianthus). The lower part, narrower and green or whitish, is the claw; the wider, colored part is the limb of the petal.

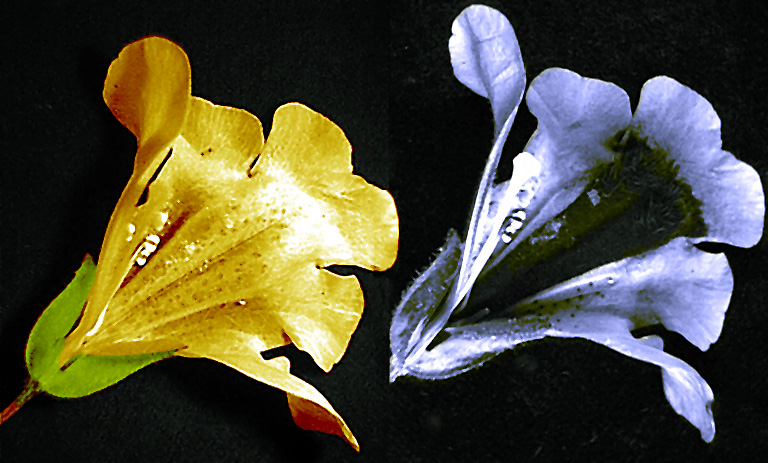
Mimulus flower. Flower under natural light (left) and under ultraviolet light (right) showing the nectar guides which are not visible to the human eye.

The corolla is the inner whorl of the perianth and the one that surrounds the fertile whorls of the flower. It is composed of petals, which are generally larger than the sepals and are colored. Each petal consists of a claw that fixes it to the receptacle and a blade or limb which is the widest and most showy part. The claw can be very short, as in roses, or very long, as in carnations (Dianthus). The blade can be very varied in shape, color and margin.

In certain genera—Narcissus, for example—there is a ligular appendage at the top of the claw that forms a cup inside the tepal cycle, called paraperigonium or "false corolla". In other cases—Hymenocallis—the paraperigonium is constituted by a membrane that joins the filaments of the stamen together. In the latter case, the paraperigonium is also called the "staminal corona".

If the petals are free from each other, the corolla is called dialipetalous. If, instead, they are joined through their margins, the corolla is called gamopetalous and, as in the case of the calyx, it has tube, throat and limb.

The shape of the gamopetalous corolla can be very varied: tubulose (cylinder-shaped, as in the central flowers of the capitula of the compositae family), infundibuliform (funnel-shaped, as in sweet potato, Ipomoea batatas, convolvulaceae); bell-shaped (like an inflated, bell-like tube, as in Convallaria majalis, Convallarioideae), hypocrateriform (shaped like a long, slender tube, as in Jasminum), labiated (with the blade formed by two unequal segments, as in Salvia splendens, a lamiaceae), ligulated (with a tongue-shaped blade, which is seen in the peripheral flowers of the capitula of many compositae) and spurred (when it has one or more nectariferous spurs, as in Aquilegia).

The anatomy of the tepals and petals is similar to that of the sepals. The epidermal cell walls are often convex or papillose, especially on the adaxial side. In many petals, such as those of Brassica napus, the papillae are conical, with a marked cuticular thickening at the apex, and radial striations toward the base. It has been suggested that this thickening allows an even diffusion of emerging light, so that the brightness of the petals is uniform at any angle of illumination. Some epidermal cells of the petals are osmophores, containing essential oils that impart the characteristic fragrance to the flowers. The mesophyll usually has no chlorophyll parenchyma, but fundamental parenchyma.

The color of the petals results from the presence of pigments. In many flowers, the cells have chromoplasts with carotenoid pigments (red, orange, yellow). The most important pigments are the flavonoids, mainly anthocyanins, which are dissolved in the cytoplasm of the cell; the basic pigments are pelargonidin (red), cyanidin (violet), and delphinidin (blue) and flavonols (yellow to ivory). The color of anthocyanin pigments depends on the acidity (pH) of the cell juice: in Brunfelsia australis ("mountain lily") the flowers are purplish but, as they age, they turn white due to a change in pH.

The white color of many flowers, such as Magnolia grandiflora, is due to the phenomenon of total reflection of light. The petals may have air spaces in subepidermal position or a layer of cells with abundant starch grains and, in both cases, the light is reflected. The dark colors are due to a total absorption of light operated by complementary pigments. In black cultivars of tulip (Tulipa gesneriana) there is blue anthocyanin in the epidermal cells and yellow carotene in the subepidermal cells.

In some species, the basal parts of the petals contain a flavonol glucoside called chalcone, which absorbs ultraviolet light, turning them into "nectar guides" for pollinating insects. This particular color, visible only to insects, is called bee purple.

== Androecium ==
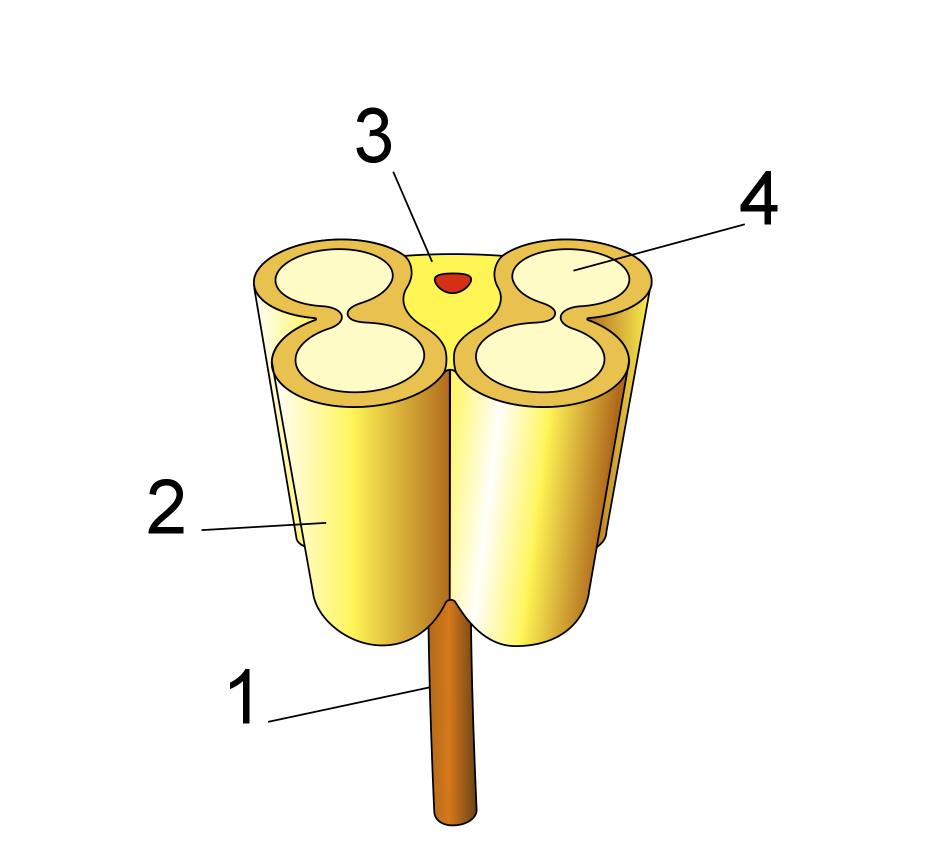
Diagram of an anther in cross section. 1: Filament; 2: Theca; 3: Connective (the conducting vessels in red); 4: Pollen sac (also called sporangium)

The androecium is one of the fertile cycles of flowers. The parts that make up the androecium are called stamens, whose function is the generation of male gametophytes or pollen grains. The stamens are highly modified leaves formed by a foot that is inserted into the receptacle of the flower, called filament, and a distal portion called anther. The filament is the sterile part of the stamen: it can be very long, short or missing, in which case the anthers are called sessile. It is usually filiform, but may be thick, even petaloid, and may be provided with appendages. The anther is the fertile part of the stamen and usually consists of two distinguishable, contiguous parts, called thecae, joined by an area called the connective, which is also where the anther joins the filament. It is usually formed by two thecae, but sometimes it can be constituted by a single theca, as in malvaceae and cannaceae, or by three, in the case of Megatritheca (sterculiaceae). If the anther is cut perpendicular to its axis, it is observed that each anther contains one or two pollen sacs extending along its entire length.

After the maturation of the pollen grains, dehiscence, or opening, of the anther occurs to let the pollen out. The tissue responsible is called endothecium. If the opening occurs along the entire length of the septum separating the pollen sacs, the dehiscence is longitudinal, which is the most frequent case. In other cases, the endothecium is located in limited areas that later arise as valves or windows: in poricidal dehiscence (as in Solanaceae), there is no endothecium, the destruction of the tissue occurs at the apex of the anther, and pores are formed through which the pollen will come out.

The number of stamens in each flower is a highly variable character. Some species of the euphorbiaceae family have flowers with only one stamen (called monanders), the oleaceae have two stamens (dianders) and, in the myrtaceae, there are numerous stamens (polyanders). The number of stamens may or may not be equal to the number of petals. Thus, the flower is said to be isostomous, if it has the same number of stamens as petals (as can be seen in the liliaceae and amaryllidaceae); anisostomous, if the number of petals is different from the number of stamens (for example, in the genus Brassica, there are four petals and 6 stamens); diplostemone, when the number of stamens is twice the number of petals (the genus Kalanchoe, for example, has four petals and eight stamens); and polystemone, when the number of stamens is more than twice the number of petals (as in Poncirus, which has five petals and numerous stamens).

Many times, the flowers have a reduced perianth and the stamens are long and showy. In these cases, the function of attracting pollinators is fulfilled by the androecium. This type of flower is usually arranged in inflorescences that, because of their shape, look like brushes or pipe cleaners - for example, the leguminous plants Inga uruguensis and Acacia caven, and myrtaceae, such as Callistemon rigidus.

The staminodes are the sterile stamens that normally appear in certain flowers. Their function is varied and may have to do with the production of nectar or with the attraction function usually fulfilled by the petals.

== Gynoecium ==
Diagram of the possible positions of the ovary I: ovary sepals, II: ovary, III: ovary. a: androcecium, g: gynoecium, p: petals, s: sepals, r: receptacle.

Diagram of an ovule in gymnosperms and angiosperms

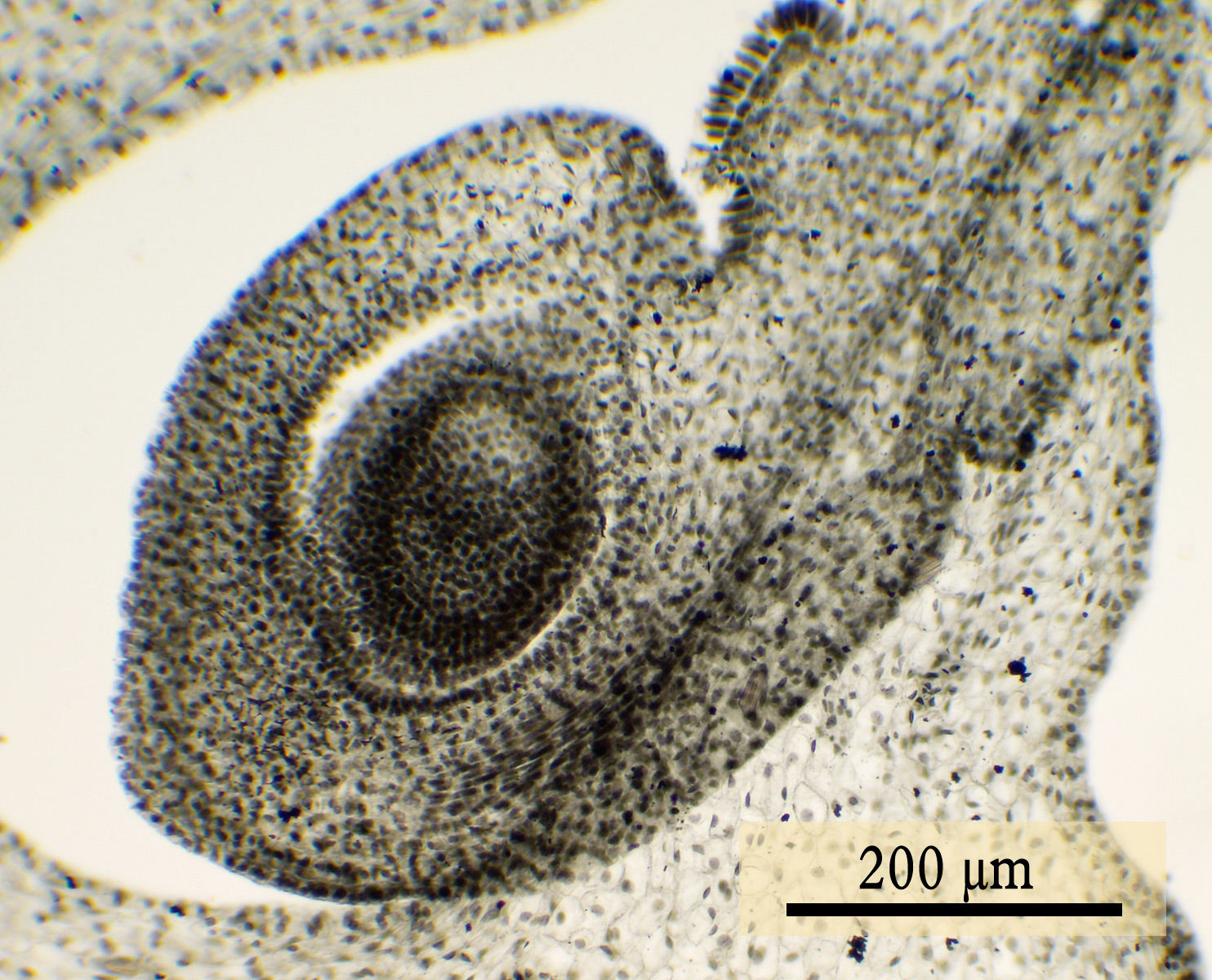
Photomicrograph of an ovule of a monocotyledon

In angiosperms, the gynoecium, also called the pistil, contains one or more carpels, or carpel leaves, that form a cavity for the ovary, inside which the ovules, or seminal primordia, are protected from both desiccation and attack by phytophagous insects.

The gynoecium consists of three parts: the ovary, a bulging lower part that forms a cavity or locule inside which are the ovules; the style, which is a more or less elongated column that supports the third component of the pistil; and the stigma. This is constituted of a specialized glandular tissue for the reception of the grains of pollen. Sometimes, the style may be absent and, in such cases, the stigma is said to be sessile.

If the carpels are separate or free from each other, the gynoecium is called dialicarpelate or apocarpic (as occurs in the genera Sedum, Kalanchoe and Paeonia); if, on the other hand, the carpels are welded together, it is called gamocarpellar or syncarpous, which is most common.

In dialycarpous flowers, each carpel constitutes a pistil, while, in syncarpous flowers, there is only one pistil. For example, Kalanchoe has four free carpels and four pistils. In the gamocarpellar, or syncarpous, gynoecium, the union of the carpels may involve only a portion of the ovary, leaving both styles and stigmas free (for example, in the genus Turnera) or may involve the ovaries and styles, leaving the stigmas free (as occurs in the compositae and in Hibiscus), so that the number of carpels that make up the pistil can be determined by observation of the number of stigmas. Finally, in many cases, the union or welding of the carpels is total. In these cases, the number of carpels can be determined through the number of stigmatic lobes (for example, in bignoniaceae).

The style is variable in length, from less than 0.5 mm (subsessile stigma) to more than 30 cm in certain varieties of maize, which are known as corn silk. It is usually borne at the apex of the ovary, but may be lateral or apparently borne at the base (gynobasic style). From an anatomical point of view, the style can be solid or hollow. In plants with hollow style, the transmission tissue, through which the pollen tube grow to effect fertilization, consists of a layer of fairly differentiated epidermal cells surrounding a hollow canal (also known as a stylar canal). The pollen tubes grow from the stigma, into the ovary, along the surface of that canal, usually through a thin layer of mucilage. In plants with solid styles, on the other hand, the epidermal cells are intimately fused and leave no space between them. The pollen tubes, in this case, grow between the cells of the transmission tissue (as in the case of Petunia) or through cell walls (as in Gossypium). The transmission tissue in solid styles includes an intercellular substance containing pectin, comparable to the mucilage found in the stylar canal of hollow styles.

Among the different families of angiosperms, solid styles are considered typical of the eudicotyledons and are rare in the monocotyledons.

The stigma is variable in shape, and can be feathery, as in the case of grasses, head-shaped, as in Citrus, lobed, as in Cucurbita, petaloid, as in Canna, and even inverted umbrella-shaped, as in Sarracenia. It has structural peculiarities that allow the germination of pollen and the development of the pollen tube that will reach the ovules. The stigma has been found to be covered by hydrophilic proteins on the outer wall; these are probably the ones that act in the recognition of suitable pollen and reaction to self-incompatibility, in which case callose may be deposited to stop the germination of incompatible pollen.

Stigmas are divided into two major groups: moist and dry stigmas. Moist stigmas release an exudate during the receptive period and occur in families such as orchidaceae, scrophulariaceae and solanaceae. Moist stigmas may have papillae (papillose stigmas, as in Annona, Mandevilla, Bignonia and Punica) or no papillae (non-papillose stigmas, in Citrus, Impatiens, Opuntia and Tamarix). Dry stigmas do not release liquid secretions, but produce proteins or waxes. They can be feathery (grasses) or non-feathery and papillose (Cordyline, Yucca Pelargonium or non-papillose (Asclepias, Capparis, Cyperus).

The ovary is the lower part of the gynoecium and contains the ovules to be fertilized. It is formed by one or more modified leaves called carpels. Inside the ovary, there are one or more cavities, or locules, that contain the eggs waiting to be fertilized. The eggs are inserted into the ovary in an area called the placenta.

One method of describing the ovary refers to the point of insertion above the receptacle, where the other floral parts (perianth and androecium) join and attach to the surface of the ovary. If the ovary is located above the point of insertion, it will be subterranean; if it is below, it will be infertile.

The seminal rudiment, also called the ovule, is the plant organ that forms in the ovary and contains the embryo sac, within which are the oosphere or female gamete, the synergid cells, the median cell with the two polar nuclei and the antipodal cells. Surrounding the embryo sac are the nucella, the integuments, the chalaza and a funiculus that connects the ovule to the placenta.

The oospore comes from a spore, called a megaspore or macrospore, through a process called megagametogenesis, which basically consists of mitotic divisions. Its nucleus is generally haploid and has half the chromosomes of the plant that gave rise to it. The oosphere fuses with one of the generative nuclei of the pollen grain during double fertilization to give rise to the embryo. The other generative nucleus will fuse with the polar nuclei of the middle cell and give rise to the endosperm.

The arrangement of the ovule in the cavity of the ovary is called placentation. The number of placentas is, in general, equal to the number of carpels forming the ovary. In certain cases, however, some of the placentas may atrophy; conversely, a pluricarpel ovary may contain only one ovule, as in grasses (Poaceae) and compositae (Asteraceae).

There are different types of placentation:

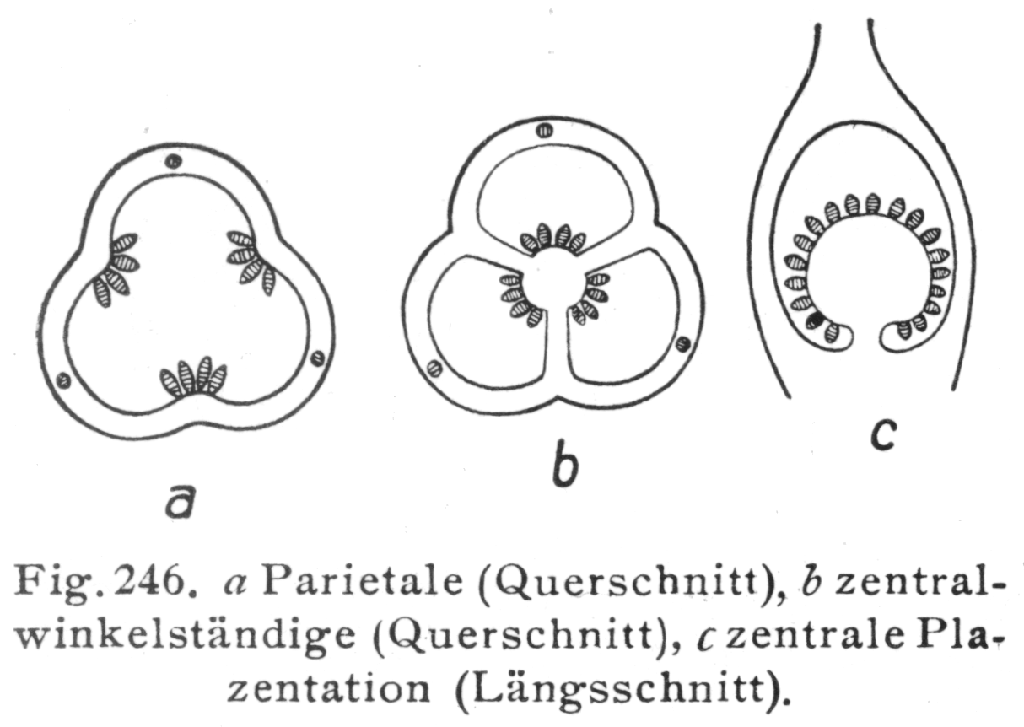
types of placentation: (a) parietal, (b) axillary and (c) central.

- Marginal placentation: is typical of a unicarpellate gynoecium (Leguminosae) or apocarpous gynoecium (Magnoliaceae, Ranunculaceae). Each carpel has a single placenta corresponding to the weld zone of the carpel leaf.
- Parietal placentation: occurs in a gynoecium formed by two or more carpels welded by their edges to form a single cavity in the ovary, so that each placenta corresponds to the edges of two contiguous carpel leaves. Some families that present this type of placentation are orchids, Violaceae, Passifloraceae and Cucurbitaceae. In certain genera, false septa form on the ovary wall, increasing the placental surface: this is called "laminar placentation" and is typical of the genus Papaver. In the Cruciferae (Brassicaceae), the ovary consists of two carpels joined at the edges that would delimit a single cavity. However, between the two sutures, a membranous septum called replum develops, which separates the cavity into two locules. The ovules are arranged on both sides, in two series for each carpel. A variant of this type of placentation, difficult to interpret by mere examination of the ovary, is that of the Gramineae (Poaceae). In these species, the ovary is bicarpellate, unilocular and uniovular. The position of the ovule is lateral, as can be deduced from the position of the thread, and the placentation is therefore parietal.
- Axillary placentation: occurs in a gynoecium formed by two or more welded carpels, in which each one carries the placenta in the central angle, so that the placental sutures form a column inside the ovary. The ovules of each locule are thus isolated from their neighbors by the carpellary septa. This type of placentation is found in Solanum, Citrus, liliaceae and iridaceae, among many other examples.
- Central placentation: occurs in a unilocular gynoecium formed by two or more united carpels, where the ovules are fixed on a central column and without partitions with the ovary wall. This column may be a basal prolongation of the placenta, as in the Primulaceae, or a set of united placentas that persist after the dissolution of the septa, as in the Caryophyllaceae.
- Basal placentation: occurs in species with pluricarpel and unilocular gynoecium. The ovule is arranged in the basal center of the ovary cavity. It is typical of the polygonaceae, chenopodiaceae and compositae families.

== Sexuality ==
Floral sexuality is related to the presence or absence of the reproductive whorls: androecium and gynoecium. Flowers that have both whorls (i.e., will produce both male and female gametes) are said to be perfect, bisexual, monoclinous or, more frequently, hermaphroditic, as is the case with potato flowers (Solanum tuberosum, Solanaceae). In many other species, on the other hand, the flowers have only one reproductive whorl and are said to be diclinate, imperfect or unisexual, as is the case in mulberry (Morus nigra, moraceae) and pumpkin (Cucurbita maxima, cucurbitaceae). When such a whorl is the androecium, the flowers are called male or staminate; while, if the whorl is the gynoecium, the flowers are called pistillate or female. There are some cases in which the flower does not present any reproductive whorls and only shows sepals and petals. The function of these flowers is to specialize, within a group of flowers that are perfect, in attracting pollinating insects to the inflorescence. Such flowers, called neutral or asexual, are usually arranged on the periphery of the inflorescence and can be observed, for example, in many species of the compositae family, such as the daisy (Bellis perennis) or sunflower (Helianthus annuus).

== Floral formula and diagram ==
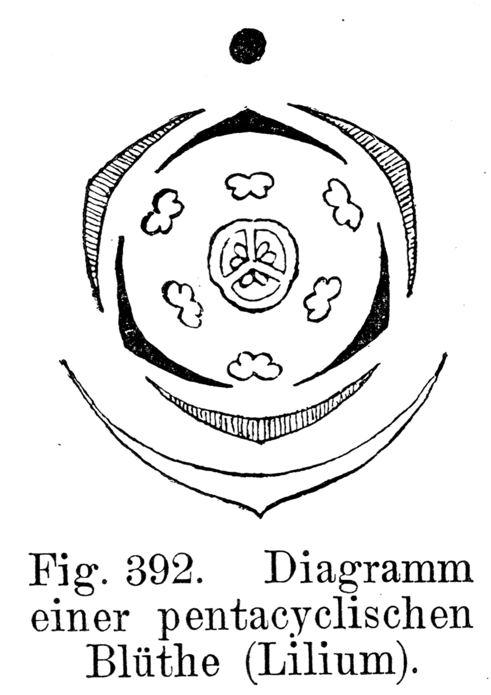
Floral diagram of Lilium.

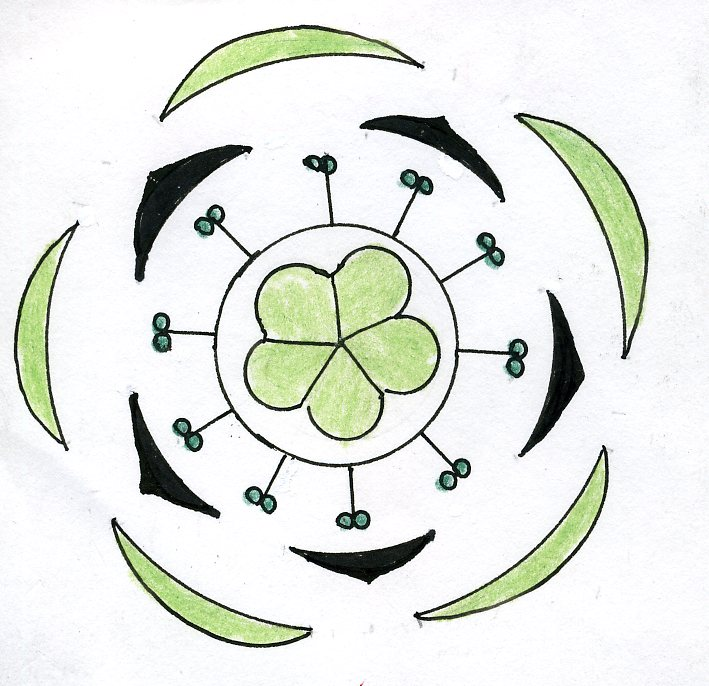
Floral diagram of Oxalis. It can be seen that the flower is hermaphrodite and actinomorphic, pentacyclic (i.e., it has 5 floral whorls) and pentamerous (each cycle is composed of five pieces).

A floral diagram is a graphic representation of the arrangement of the floral parts, and the arrangement of the different whorls, in cross section. Each whorl is represented, conventionally, by a concentric circumference around the gynoecium, indicated by a cut at the level of the ovary. The sepals are drawn as white lunules and the petals are black, or sometimes colored, lunules. The stamens are symbolized by cross sections of the anther, and the gynoecium is represented in the center of the diagram by a cross section of the ovary. Usually, the pieces of one whorl alternate with the pieces of the previous whorl. The stamens may be opposite or alternate with respect to the petals. The welding between the pieces of each whorl or of opposite whorls is indicated by dotted lines.

By means of these diagrams, the floral structure is well manifested and its symmetry is deduced, as is the number of members of each whorl and the vernation, welding or independence of the sepals and petals. From the androecium, one can determine the relative position of the stamens with respect to the perianth, the concrescence or separation of the same, their union or autonomy with respect to the corolla and the introrse or extrorse position of the anthers. From the gynoecium, the number of carpels and cavities in the ovary and the placentation of the ovules can be observed.

The diagram above shows the floral diagram of Lilium, typical of the liliaceae family. The diagram shows that the flowers are hermaphrodites (have stamens and pistil) and actinomorphic (have several planes of symmetry). The perigonium is formed by 6 tepals, arranged in two trimerous (formed by three pieces) whorls, which are polyphyllous (separated from each other and free from the other floral pieces). The androecium has 6 stamens, also arranged in two trimerous whorls and the filaments are separated from each other and free from the other floral parts. The androecium is diplostomatous (the outer whorl of stamens is opposite the outer tepals and the inner cycle is opposite the inner tepals), has superior ovary and trilocular (is formed by 3 connate carpels). The ovule has axillary placentation.

The floral formula is a way of symbolically representing the structure of a flower through the use of letters, numbers and other signs. Typically, the floral formula is used to represent the morphological characteristics of the flowers of a given plant family, rather than of a particular species. The following are the most commonly used symbols:

- K = calyx; for example, "K5" indicates that the flower has 5 sepals.
- C = corolla; for example, "C3" means that the flower has 3 petals.
- Z = is added if the corolla is zygomorphic; for example, "CZ^{6}" indicates a zygomorphic corolla with 6 petals.
- A = androecium; for example, "A^{∞}" means that it has many stamens.
- G = gynoecium; thus, "G(3)_{1}^{∞}" indicates a gynoecium with a succumbent ovary (hence the "G" is underlined), composed of 3 capelli joined (hence the number three is put in parentheses), with a single locule and numerous ovules per locule. The number of locules of the ovary is given as a subscript of the number of carpels; the number of ovules per locule is given as an exponent.

A floral formula then acquires a form like the following, typical of the lily family:

K3 C3 A6 G(3)_{3}^{∞}

which indicates that the flowers of this family have 3 sepals, 3 petals, an androecium with 6 stamens and a gynoecium with a succulent ovary formed by 3 carpels joined, with three loculi and numerous ovules per locule. The floral formula that symbolically describes the floral structure of ''Oxalis'', previously described, is:

K5 C5 A10 G(5)_{5}^{∞}

== Double-flowered ==
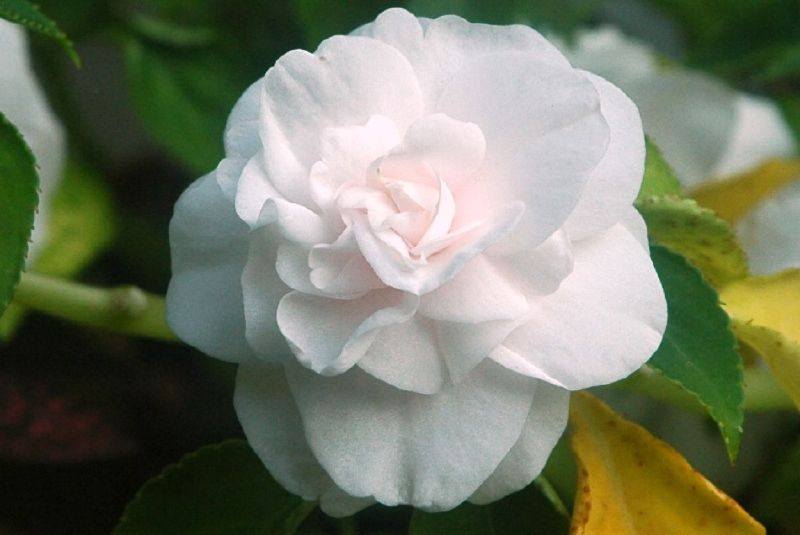
A double-flowered variety of impatiens walleriana

The term double-flower describes those flowers that present an extra number of petals, much higher than the usual number for the species in question, because some or all their stamens are replaced by petals.

The "double-flowered" characteristic is denoted in the scientific names of the varieties by the abbreviation fl. pl. (flore pleno, meaning "full flowering"). It was the first abnormality to be documented in flowers and is one of the most popular characteristics in many ornamental species, such as the rose bush, camellia and carnation.

== Floral morphology in some families of plants ==
=== Amaryllidaceae ===
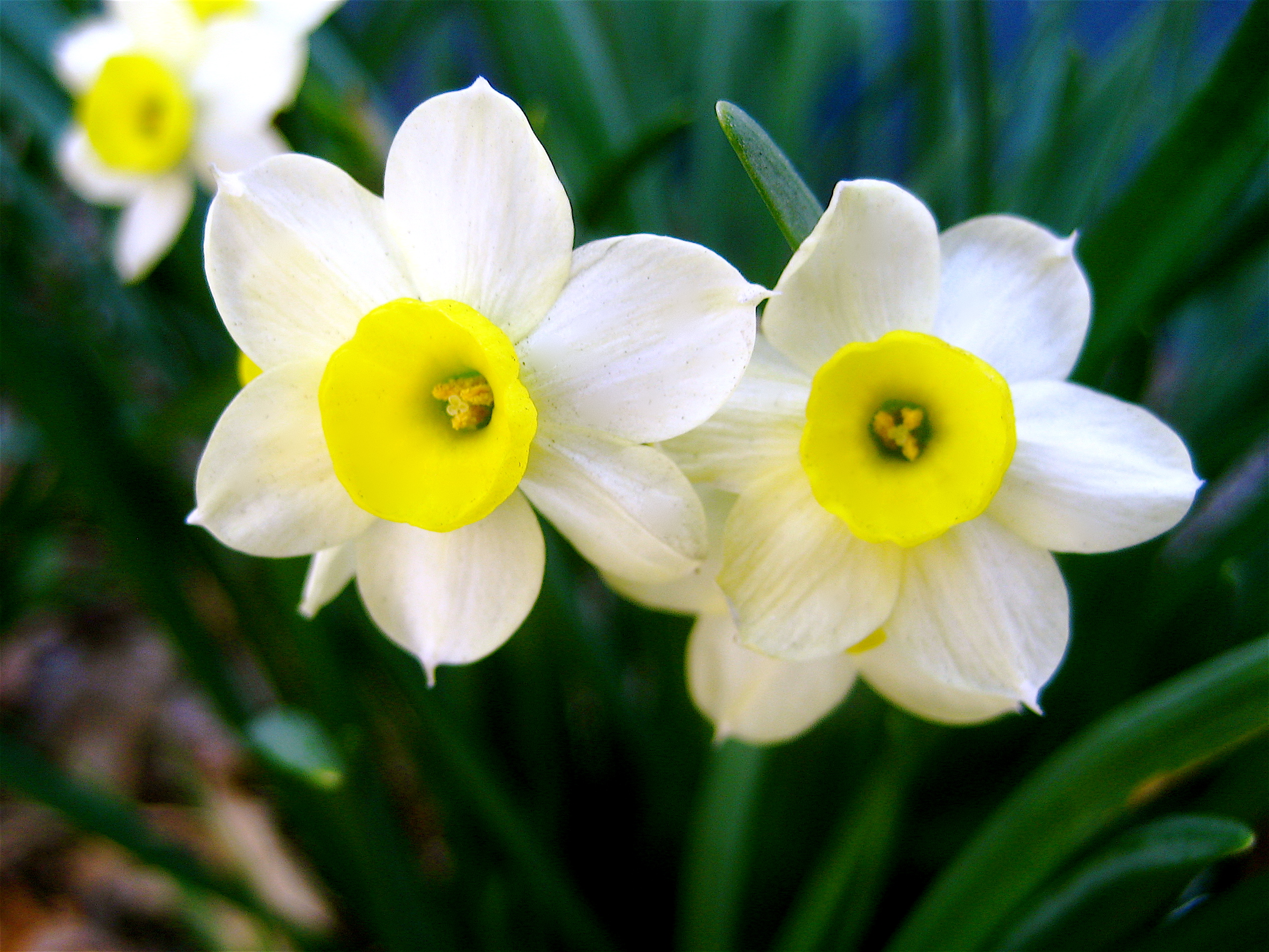
Perigonium (cream) and paraperigonium (yellow) in Narcissus, an amaryllidacea.

Within the monocotyledons, plants belonging to the Amaryllidaceae family have the simplest and most typical flowers. The flowers are hermaphroditic, actinomorphic (of radial symmetry) or slightly zygomorphic, pedicellate or sessile, showy, and each associated with a filiform bract. The perigonium is composed of six tepals arranged in two whorls of 3 pieces each, which have approximately the same shape and size. The tepals may be free from each other or welded at the base, forming a perigonial tube or hypanthium, which is extended, in some cases, in a "crown"—also called a paraperigonium or false corolla, for example in Narcissus—sometimes reduced to scales or unremarkable teeth.

The androecium has six stamens arranged in two whorls of three pieces each—though it may rarely have only three stamens, as in Zephyra, or from 9 to 18, as in Gethyllis—opposite the tepals, inserted on the perigonium tube or the base of the tepals. The filaments are slender, filiform or flared at the base, may be free (Hippeastrum) or bound together by a membrane surrounding the entire ovary called the "staminal cup" (Hymenocallis). The anthers are oblong or linear. The stamens sometimes have appendages that form a staminal corona—for example, Hymenocallis.

The gynoecium has either an ovary (in amaryllioids) or a superior ovary (in agapanthoids and allioids). It is formed by three carpels joined and delimiting three cavities or loculi, which contain from two to three to many anthropoid ovules of axillary placentation. The ovary is continuous, with a style and a minute, capitate to deeply trifid stigma. They usually present floral nectaries and the secretion of nectar comes from the perigonium or gynoecium, usually in the septa of the ovary.

The flowers are arranged in cymose inflorescences at the apex of a scape, sometimes compressed and umbel-like, and are thus called "pseudoumbels". They are rarely reduced to solitary flowers. The involucral bracts, which enclose the flower buds, may be present or absent.

=== Compositae ===
Diagram of a ligulate flower

Diagram of a tubular flower

In compositae, the sunflower family and margarita, the flowers are small hermaphrodites or, sometimes, functionally unisexual or sterile. By their symmetry, they can be both actinomorphic and zygomorphic. Because of the number of pieces that compose each cycle, the flowers of the composites are pentamerous. The calyx is null or the sepals are deeply modified, forming a pappus, from two to many scales, bristles or hairs, persistent, sometimes joined.

The corolla is gametopetalous, with five petals that may be joined to form a tube with 4 or 5 lobes (in the tubulose flower or floret) or with two groups of petals joined (in the case of bilabiated flowers, with an upper lip formed by 2 petals and a lower lip formed by 3 petals), or they can present a short tube and a laterally prolonged limb in a ligule with 3 or 5 teeth (ligulated flowers).

The androecium usually has 5 stamens, which alternate with the corolla lobes. The filaments, separated from each other, are inserted in the corolla tube. The anthers are joined, forming a tube around the style in which the pollen is released, and the style then grows through this tube, pushing out or taking up the pollen (with variably developed hairs) and presenting it to floral visitors, after which the stigmas become receptive, with a plunger or brush pollination mechanism.

The gynoecium is two carpels joined, with the ovary being inferoid and unilocular. The pistil has a style that usually has a nectary at its apex. The style is distally divided into two branches (stylar branches) which have style papillae on their adaxial side arranged in two separate lines or in a single continuous band.

=== Legumes ===
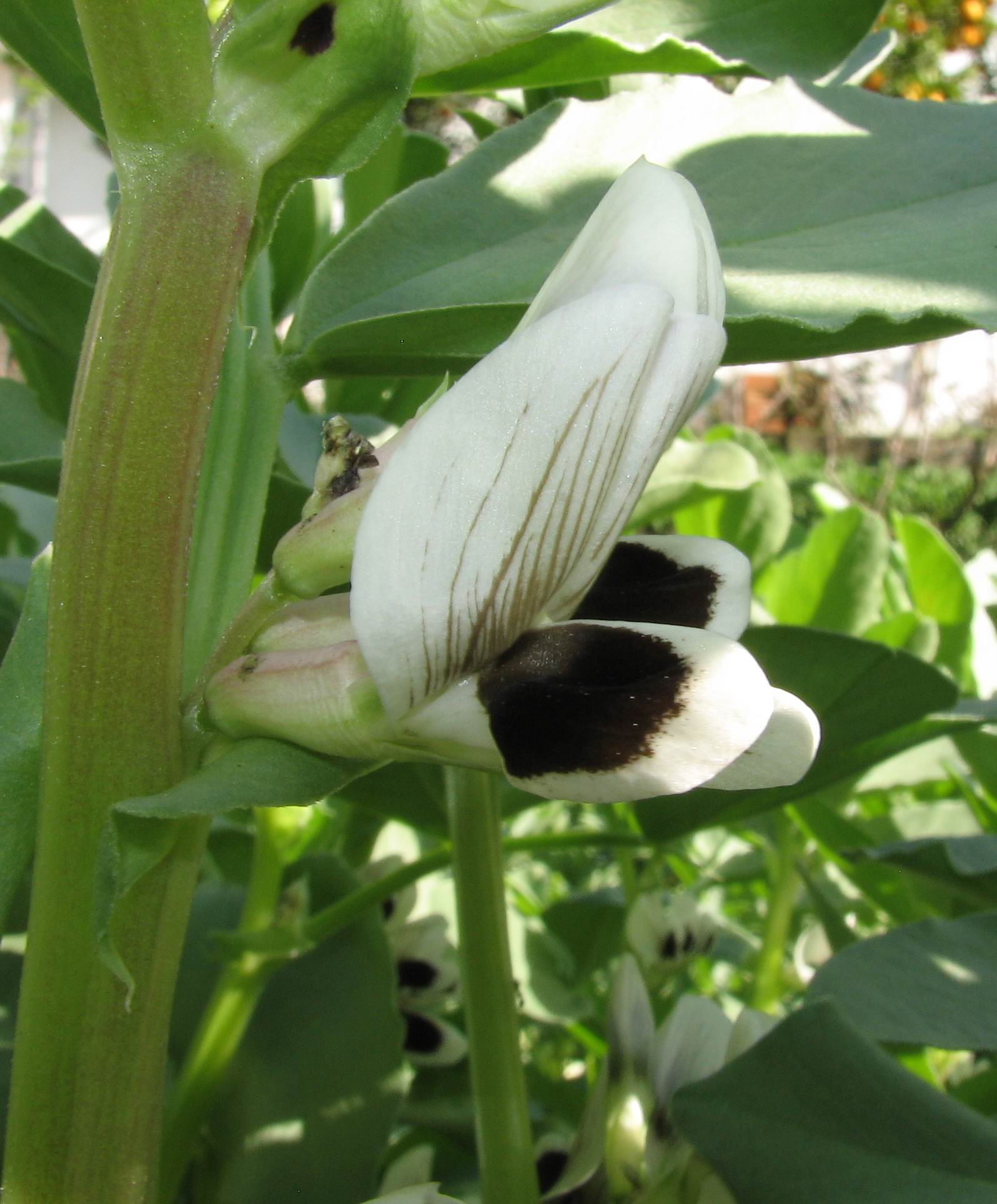
Vicia faba flower

Leguminosae, the acacias and bean family, have a great diversity of flower types, depending on the subfamily: mimosoideae, caesalpinioideae and faboideae. The flowers can range from small to large, actinomorphic (in Mimosoideae) to slightly or deeply zygomorphic (Papilionoideae and most Caesalpinioideae). Irregularities in floral symmetry in these cases involve the perianth and androecium. The perianth almost always has a distinct calyx and corolla. However, the corolla may be absent, in which case the perianth is said to be sepaline, as occurs in dozens of Caesalpinioideae. The calyx has 5 sepals (rarely 3 or 6) arranged in a single cycle, which may be wholly or partially united with each other. The calyx, moreover, may or may not be persistent, is rarely acrescent (continuing in the fruit), imbricate or valvate. The corolla is composed of 5 free petals (commonly less than 5 or absent in Swartzieae, Amorphieae and Caesalpinioideae, or 3 to 4 in Mimosoideae) or partially united and presents, in general, a characteristic morphology. Thus, the papilionaceous corolla is composed of a highly developed upper petal, known as vexillum, two lateral petals or wings, and two lower pieces, often connivent, that constitute a symmetrical structure called a carina or keel. This architecture is very similar to that of Caesalpinioideae but, unlike the latter, has vexillary or descending vernation, i.e., with the vexillum covering the rest of the corolla pieces inside the flower bud.

The gynoecium has superior monocarpellar ovary, with very variable development and a tendency to reduce the number of ovules.

=== Gramineae ===
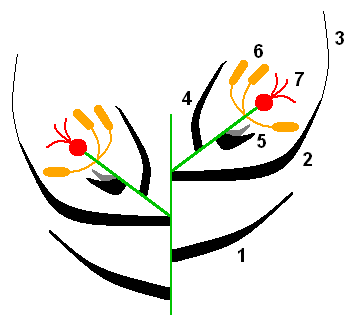
Scheme of a spikelet: 1. Glumes; 2: Lemma; 3: Arista; 4: Palea; 5: Lodicules; 6: Androcecium; 7: Gynoecium.

Gramineae, the grass and cereal family, have deeply modified flowers. The elementary inflorescence in this family is a small spike formed by one or more seated or sessile flowers on a jointed rachis, often very short, called rachilla and protected by sterile bracts called glumes. This type of inflorescence is called spikelet. The flowers can be hermaphrodites or unisexuals and present a rudimentary perianth of 2 or 3 pieces, the lodiculae or glumellulae. These lodicules are the organs that, when they become turgid, determine the opening of the antecio or floral box during flowering, allowing the feathery stigmas and the stamens to be exposed. The anthers are formed by the lemma, attached to the rachilla and the palea inserted on the floral axis that arises above the rachilla in the axil of the lemma and supports the floral organs themselves. The lemma (or lower glumella) is keel-shaped, can be mutic or aristate, and embraces the palea with its edges. The arista arises at the extremity of the lemma or on its dorsum. The upper palea, or glumella, is lanceolate, binervate and is like a cap that encloses the flower. The glumes are inserted above the rachilla, one lower than the other.

=== Orchids ===
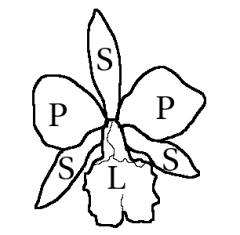
Arrangement of the perianth parts in orchids, showing the petals (P), sepals (S) and labellum (L).

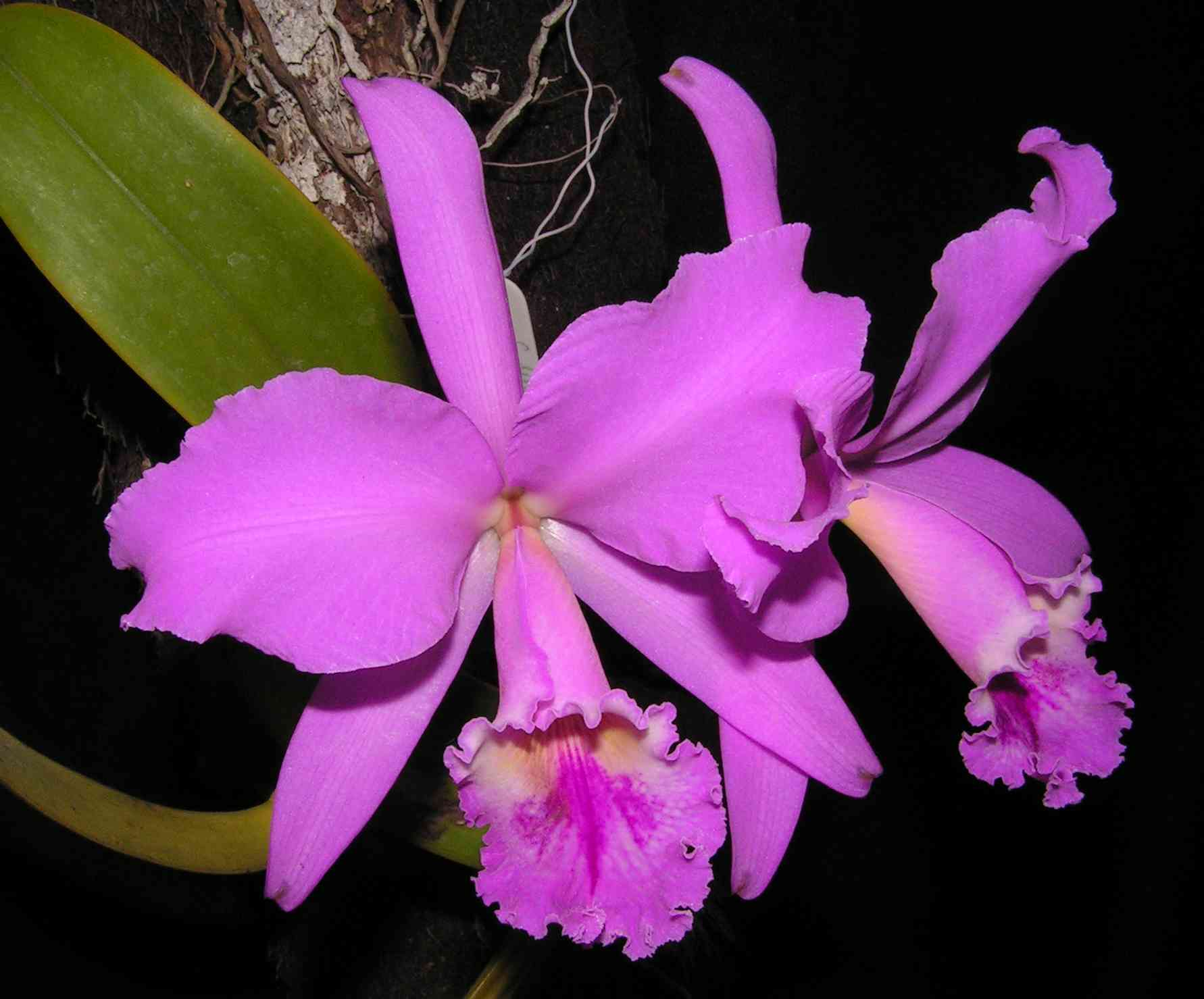
Cattleya labiata flower, note the arrangement of the perianth pieces in relation to the upper outline.

No plant family has such a diverse range of flowers. Flowers are highly specialized in relation to their pollinators. Flowers are hermaphroditic (rarely unisexual), generally zygomorphic (bilaterally symmetrical), usually resupinates (the floral parts rotate 180° during development), often conspicuous and epigynous (the perianth parts are arranged above the ovary).

In the vast majority of genera, the flowers consist of three external parts called sepals, two lateral and one dorsal, and three internal elements called petals, the lower one modified into a lip or labellum of larger size and more intense color than the others. Some authors interpret the perianth of orchids to be a perigonium, formed by six tepals arranged in two whorls. The different parts of the perianth may be separated from each other or fused at the base. The sepals, or outer tepals, are usually petaloid (petal-like) and imbricate. Sometimes, the two lateral sepals are fused into a single element called a synsepal. The petals, or inner tepals, are always separate, sometimes with dots, spots and various colors. The labellum is the middle petal, larger in size than the two lateral petals, and its shape is extremely variable: it often has three lobes but can have unusual shapes, fleshy bumps, ridges or a basal spur, and often has a different coloration pattern than the lateral petals.

The androecium is usually formed by one or two stamens (sometimes three) - if only one, derived from the middle stamen of the ancestral outer whorl, and usually with two vestigial staminodes derived from the lateral stamens of an ancestral inner whorl. In some subfamilies, such as Apostasioideae or Cypripedioideae, there are two or three fertile stamens. When there are two, they are derived from the two lateral stamens of the ancestral inner whorl, and when three, they originate from the two laterals of the inner whorl and the middle stamen of the outer whorl. The androecium is fused to the style and stigma, which are highly modified, forming a structure known as a column, gynostemium or gynostegium. The thecae of the anthers are arranged in the portion of the gynostegium called the clinandrium. The pollen is granular, in tetrads or agglutinated in two to eight soft or hard masses called pollinia. These pollinia present a filiform appendage—called caudicula—which is united with a sticky mass—retinaculum or viscidium—on the rostellum, a structure derived from the stigma, with the shape of an elongated lobe, which is located on the receptive portion of the stigma. The set of pollinia, caudiculae and retinacula is called the pollinarium, which is the transport unit of the pollen during pollination. The anthers are longitudinally dehiscent and their connective is often modified into an operculum that covers the anther until pollination.

The gynoecium consists of three carpels fused together, with the inferior ovary, which may have one locule or three, numerous ovules (up to millions) and usually parietal placentation, though it may be axillary.

Orchids are, in general, producers of nectar, a substance that they use as a reward for pollinators. The nectaries are variable in position and type. For example, they can be found on the spur of the labellum, on the apices of the sepals, or on the inner walls of the gynoecium. Species that do not produce nectar are autogamous or apomictic - they do not need pollinators to produce seeds.

== See also ==
- Flower
- Pollination
- ABC model of flower development
