= Merosity =

Metric in plant morphology

Merosity (from the greek "méros," which means "having parts") refers to the number of component parts in a distinct whorl of a plant structure. The term is most commonly used in the context of a flower where it refers to the number of sepals in a whorl of the calyx, the number of petals in a whorl of the corolla, the number of stamens in a whorl of the androecium, or the number of carpels in a whorl of the gynoecium. The term may also be used to refer to the number of leaves in a leaf whorl.

	Noun	Adjective
2 parts	dimery	dimerous, 2-merous
3 parts	trimery	trimerous, 3-merous
4 parts	tetramery	tetramerous, 4-merous
5 parts	pentamery	pentamerous, 5-merous
many parts	polymery	polymerous
few parts	oligomery	oligomerous

The adjective n-merous refers to a whorl of n parts, where n is any integer greater than one.

In nature, five or three parts per whorl have the highest frequency of occurrence, but four or two parts per whorl are not uncommon. Two consecutive whorls of dimerous petals are often mistaken for tetramerous petals.

If all of the whorls in a given floral arrangement have the same merosity, the flower is said to be isomerous, otherwise the flower is anisomerous. For example, Trillium is isomerous since all whorls are trimerous (one whorl of three sepals, zero or one whorl of three petals, two whorls of three stamens each, and one whorl of three carpels). Trillium also has one whorl of three leaves.

	Noun	Adjective
equal parts	isomery	isomerous
unequal parts	anisomery	anisomerous

== Gallery ==
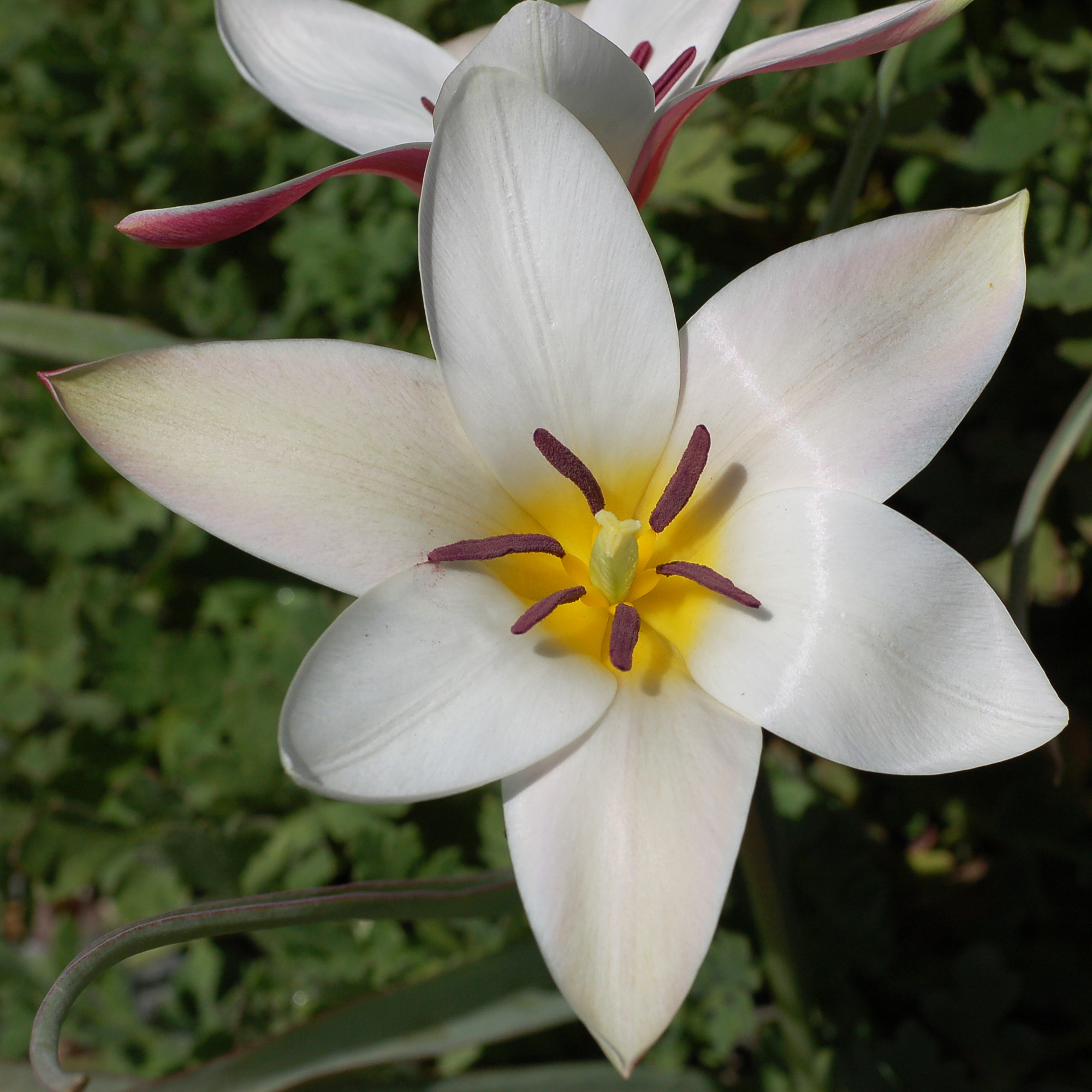
Trimerous flower of Tulipa clusiana (the three sepals resemble petals)

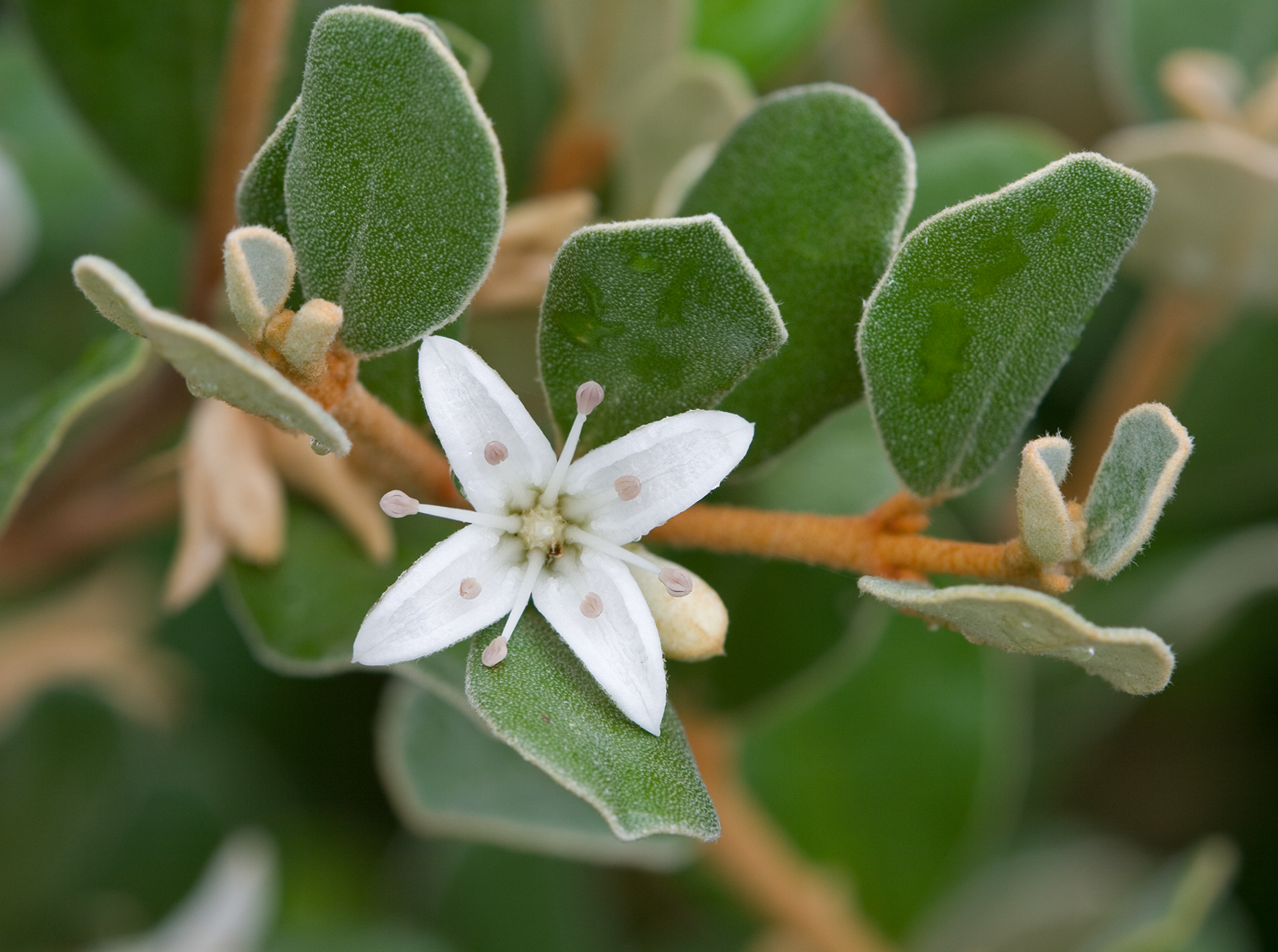
Tetramerous flower of Correa alba

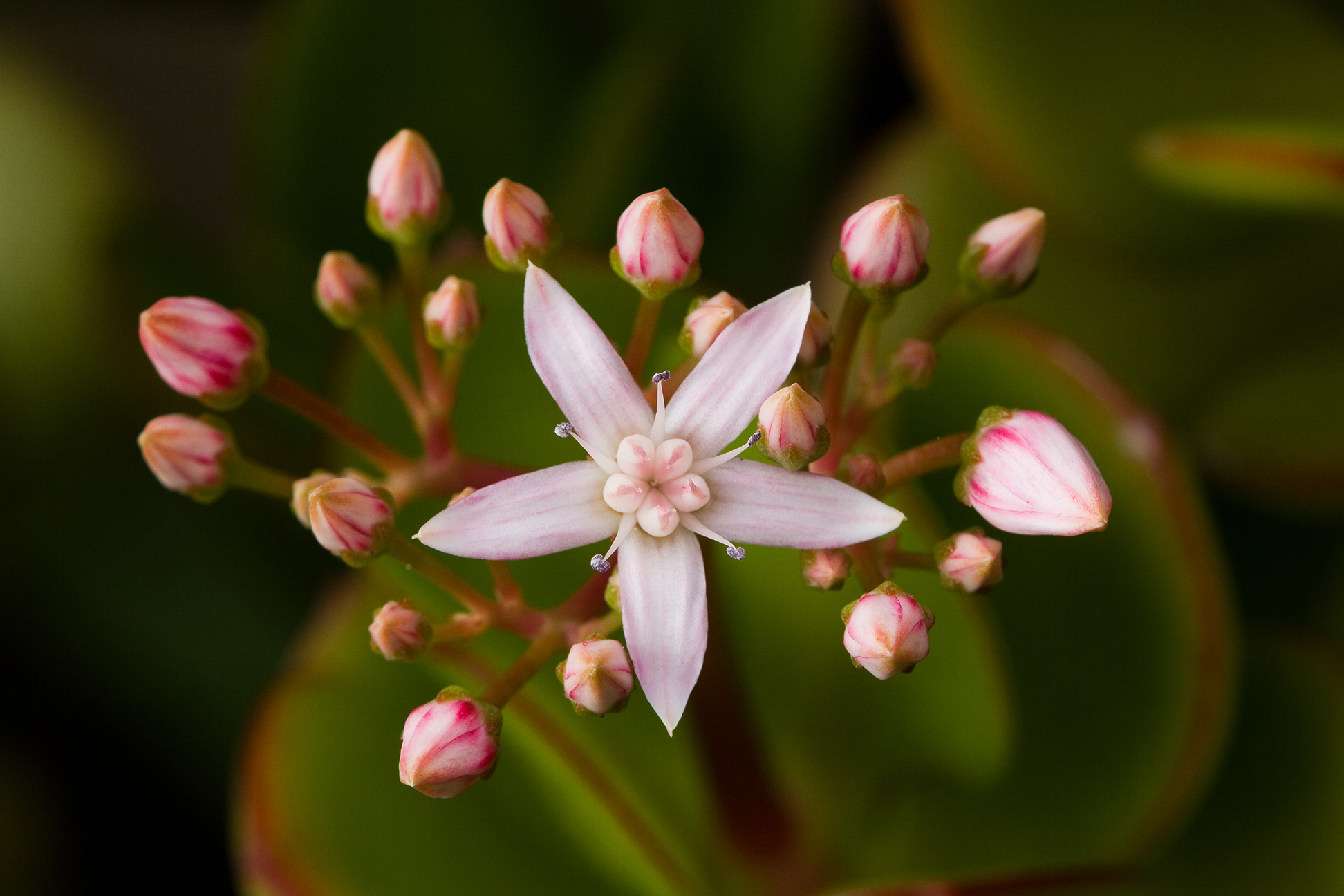
Pentamerous flower of Crassula ovata

== See also ==
- Cyclic flower
- Floral diagram
- Floral formula
