= The Connector =

The Connector may refer to:

== Media and entertainment ==
- The Connector (musical), a 2023 musical by Jason Robert Brown
- The Connector, a 2006–2008 online student news publication of Savannah College of Art and Design

== Transport ==
- Fairfax Connector, a public bus service in Fairfax County, Virginia, US
- Connector (Cincinnati), a streetcar system in Cincinnati, Ohio, US

== See also ==
- Connector (disambiguation)
- The Connection (disambiguation)
