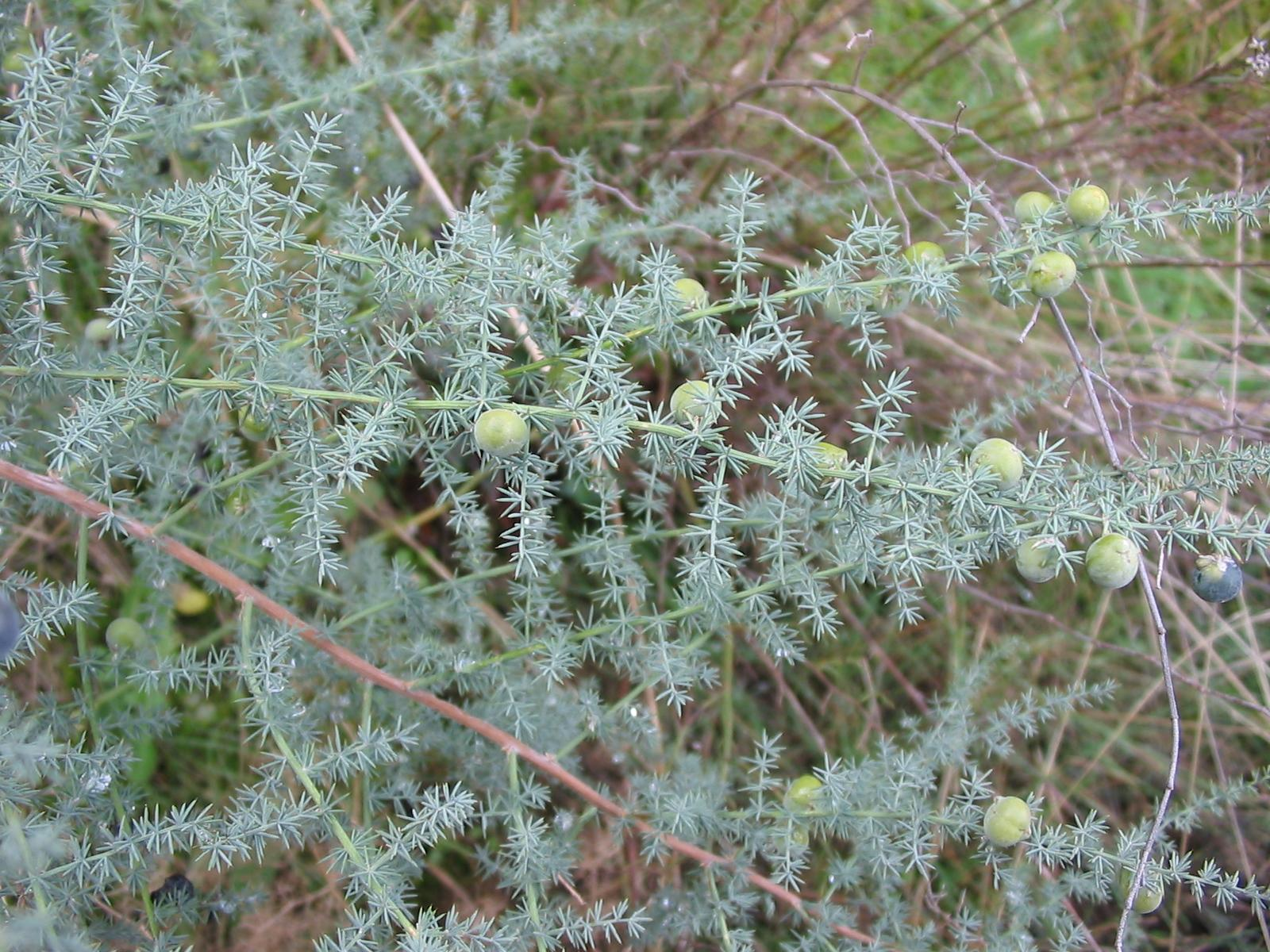
- Plant and berries of Asparagus acutifolius

Conservation status
- Least Concern (IUCN 3.1)

Scientific classification
- Kingdom: Plantae
- Clade: Tracheophytes
- Clade: Angiosperms
- Clade: Monocots
- Order: Asparagales
- Family: Asparagaceae
- Subfamily: Asparagoideae
- Genus: Asparagus
- Species: A. acutifolius

Binomial name
- Asparagus acutifolius L.

Synonyms
- Asparagus corruda Scop.; Asparagus ambiguus De Not.; Asparagus commutatus Ten.

= Asparagus acutifolius =

Species of plant

Asparagus acutifolius, common name wild asparagus, is an evergreen perennial plant belonging to the genus Asparagus. The specific epithet, acutifolius is derived from Latin acutus (pointed, acute), and -folius (-leaved), and refers to the characteristic shape of the leaves, a quite common feature in the typical plants of the Mediterranean.

== Description ==
Asparagus acutifolius reaches on average 30–70 centimetres (12–28 in) of height. The stems have much-branched feathery foliage. The "leaves" are in fact needle-like modified stems. The flowers are bell-shaped and in small clusters, greenish-white to yellowish, 4.5–5.5 millimetres (0.18–0.22 in) long. The flowers are dioecious (on each plant they are only female or male). In some Mediterranean regions flowering occurs in late summer from August through September, often after heavy storms. In this case the small green berries, of 5–6 millimetres (0.20–0.24 in) in diameter, are fully ripe in winter.

== Gallery ==
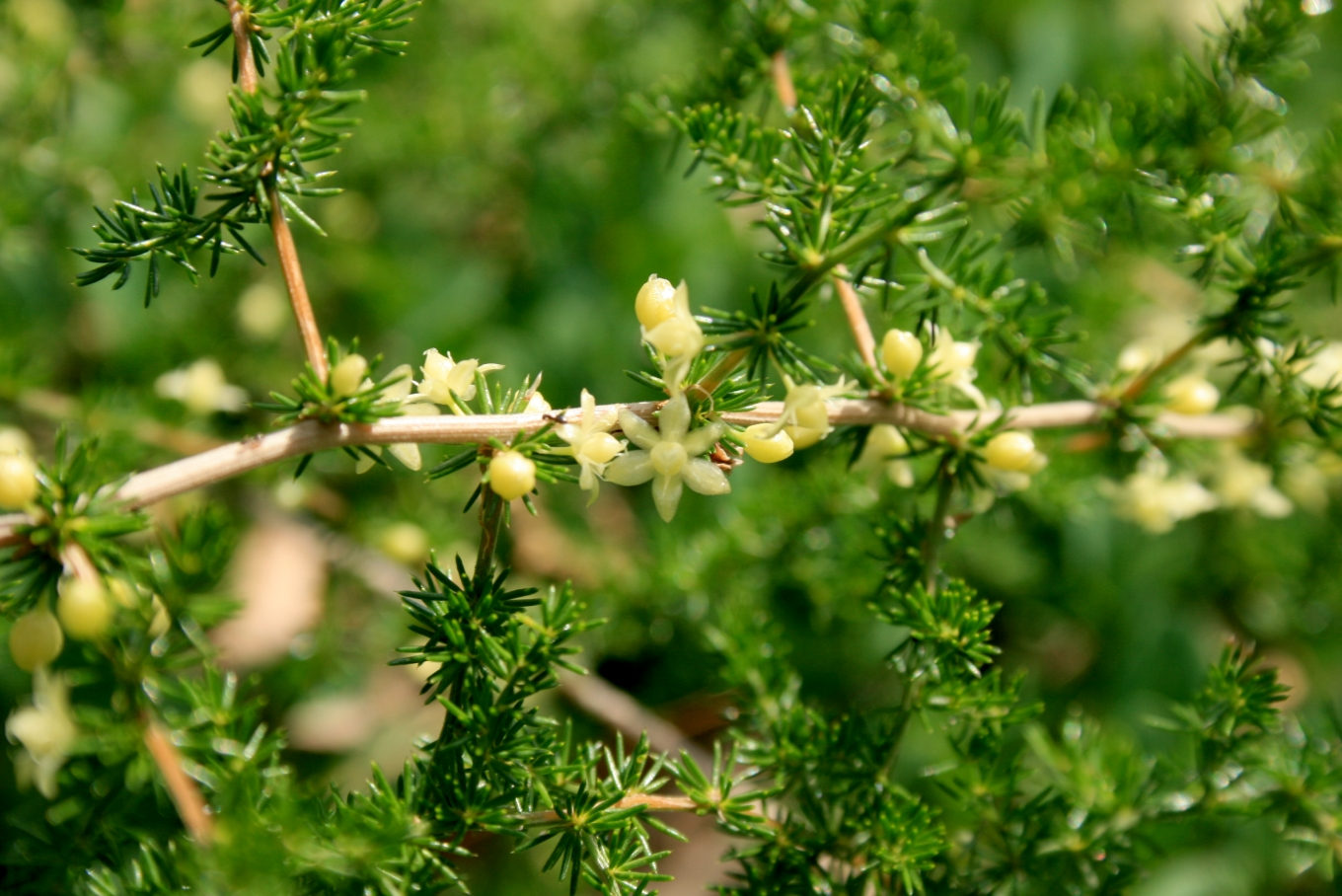
Plant and flowers of Asparagus acutifolius

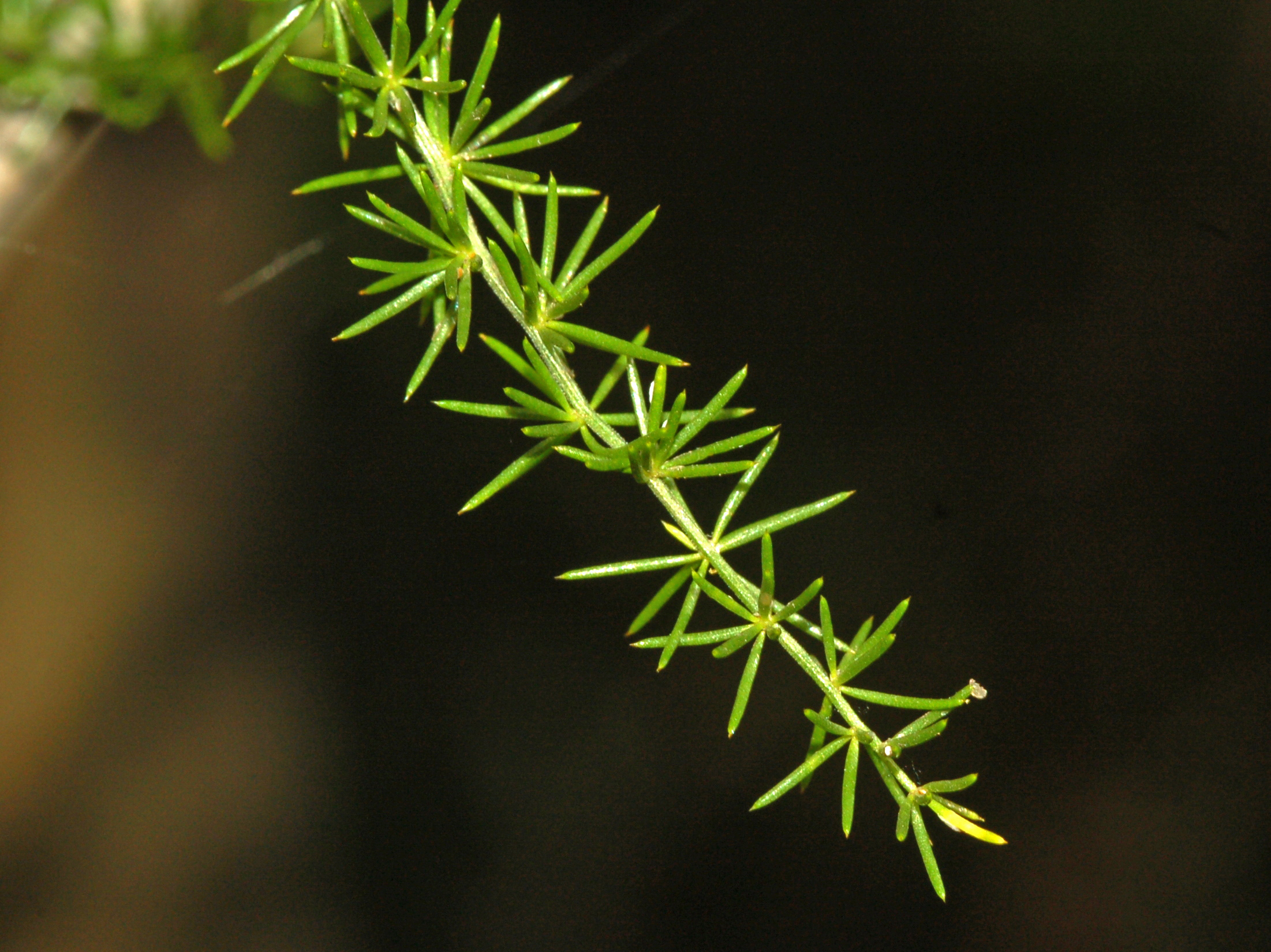
Branch of Asparagus acutifolius

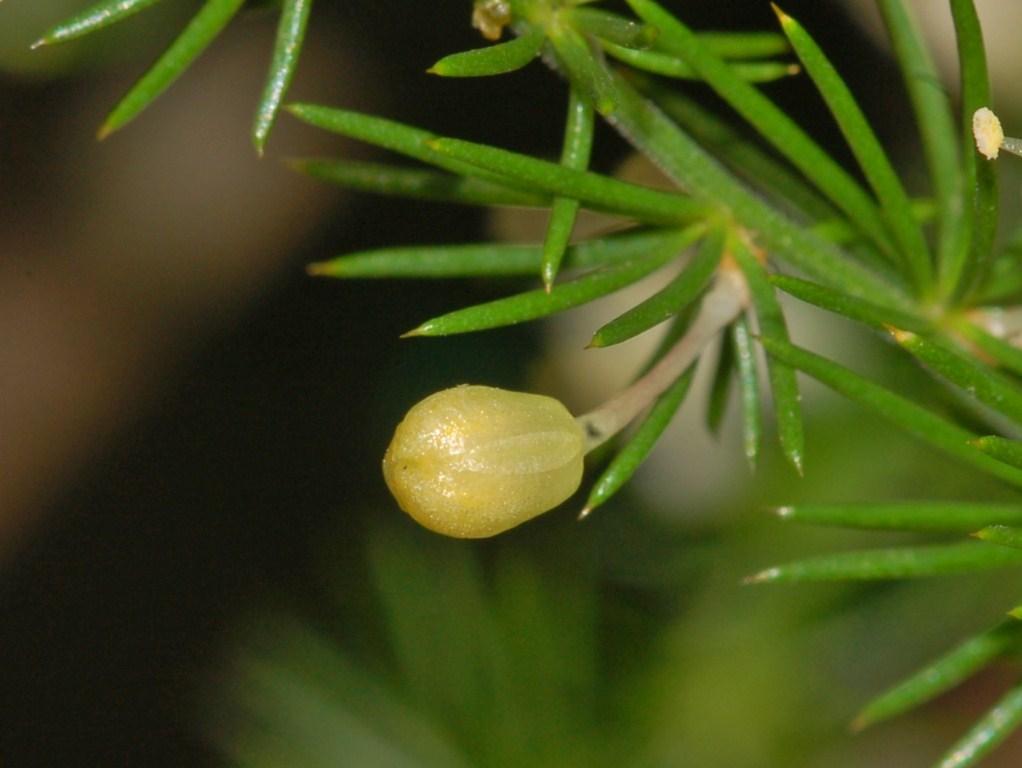
Bud of Asparagus acutifolius

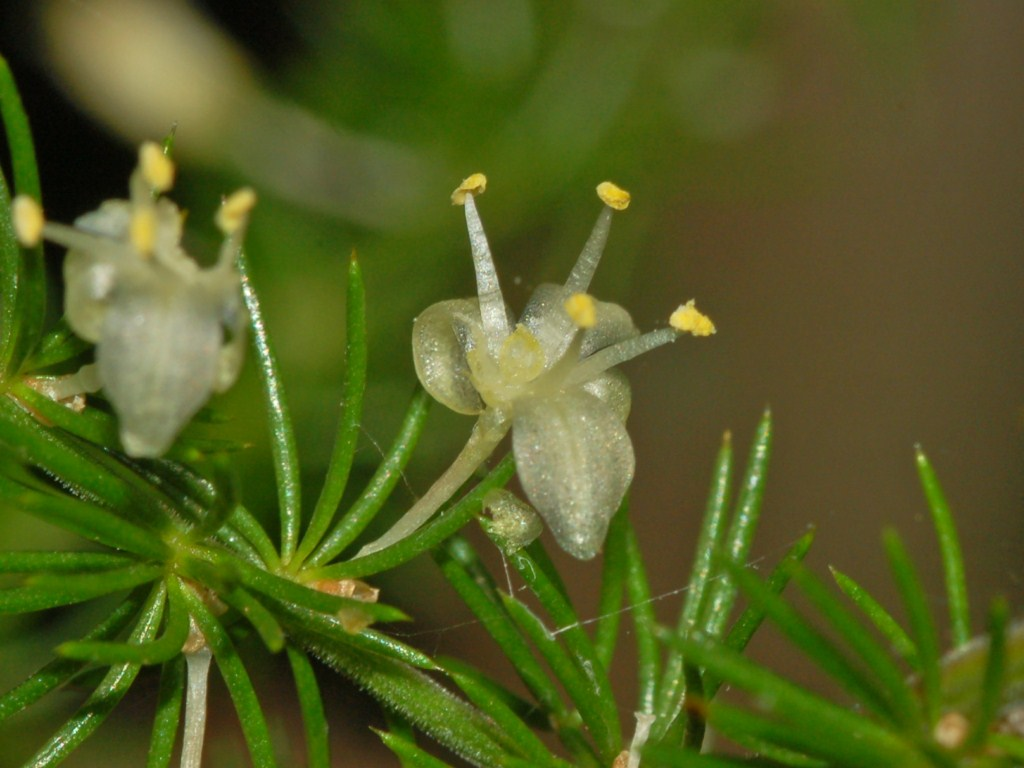
Flower of Asparagus acutifolius

== Distribution ==
This species is present throughout the Mediterranean Basin.

== Habitat ==
These plants grow near woods and in uncultivated places, on dry and sunny soil. They can be found at an altitude of 0–1,300 metres (0–4,265 ft) above sea level.

== Uses ==
Shoots are collected in the spring along the Croatian coast and islands and eaten in risottos and fried with scrambled eggs.
