= Connective =

Connective may refer to:

- Connective tissue
- Discourse connective, in linguistics, a word or phrase like "therefore" or "in other words".
- Logical connective
- Connective (botany), in the stamen of flowers, the sterile tissue that connects the anther chambers to one another and to the filament

== See also ==
- Connection (disambiguation)
