= Connections =

Connections may refer to:

== Television ==
- Connections: An Investigation into Organized Crime in Canada, a documentary television series
- Connections (British TV series), a 1978 documentary television series and book by science historian James Burke
- Connections (game show), a British game show of the 1980s
- "Connections" (Suspects), a 2015 television episode

== Other uses ==
- Connections (journal), a defense periodical
- Connections (1995 video game), a 1995 educational adventure video game
- The New York Times Connections, a word game produced by The New York Times
- Connections Academy, a free US public school that students attend from home
- Connections Nightclub, a nightclub in Northbridge, Western Australia
- IBM Connections, a Web 2.0 enterprise social software application
- Connections (album), 2008, by A. R. Rahman

== See also ==
- Connection (disambiguation), the singular form
- Connexions (disambiguation)
