= Connector =

Connector may refer to:

== Hardware ==
- Plumbing
- Electrical connector, a device for joining electrical circuits together (sometimes known as ports, plugs, or interfaces)
  - Gender of connectors and fasteners
  - AC power plugs and sockets, devices that allow electrically operated equipment to be connected to the primary alternating current power supply in a building
  - RF connector, an electrical connector designed to work at radio frequencies in the multi-megahertz range
  - Circular connector
  - Cigarette lighter receptacle
  - Blind mate connector, a connector with self-aligning features
  - Board-to-board connector, for connecting printed circuit boards
- Optical fiber connector, for joining optical fibers in communication systems
- Phone connector (disambiguation)
- Structural connector, in engineering

== Software ==
- Connector (computer science), a pointer or link between two data structures
- Data connector, generic term for software which allows loading of data from one place to another, e.g. databases, file systems or events
  - Database connector, software which allows client software to talk to database server
- Java EE Connector Architecture, a Java-based tool for connecting application servers and enterprise information systems

== Other uses ==
- Connector (mathematics), a mathematical mapping
- Connector (road), a highway or freeway road that connects to another highway or freeway
  - Northern Connector, highway in Australia
- Connector (social), people who help others by connecting them together
- Connector (Cincinnati), streetcar system in Cincinnati, Ohio
- Connector (I the Mighty album), by rock band I the Mighty
- A free bus on there Adelaide Metro, South Australia
- Connector (IMO 9435480) – an offshore support vessel built in 2011

== See also ==
- The Connector (disambiguation)
