= Disconnect =

Disconnect may refer to:

== Film and television ==
- Disconnect (2012 film), an American psychological drama film
- Disconnect (2018 film), a Kenyan romantic comedy film
- "Disconnect" (Prison Break), a 2006 television episode
- "The Disconnect", a 2005 episode of The O.C.
- Disconnect, a short film featured by video platform Shen Yun Creations

== Music ==
=== Albums ===
- Disconnect (Iris album), 2000
- Disconnect (JES album), 2007
- Disconnect, by Helen Jane Long, 2022
- Disconnect, by Phantoms, 2019
- Disconnect, by Threat Signal, 2017

=== Songs ===
- "Disconnect" (Becky Hill and Chase & Status song), 2023
- "Disconnect" (Clean Bandit and Marina and the Diamonds song), 2017
- "Disconnect" (Rollins Band song), 1994
- "Disconnect", by 6lack from East Atlanta Love Letter, 2018
- "Disconnect", by Digital Summer from Cause and Effect, 2007
- "Disconnect", by Ima Robot from Monument to the Masses, 2006
- "Disconnect", by Korn from Requiem, 2022
- "Disconnect", by Megadeth from The World Needs a Hero, 2001

== Other uses ==
- Disconnect (software), an anti-tracker browser extension and mobile app
- Disconnector, a type of electrical switch

== See also ==
- Disconnected (disambiguation)
- Disconnection (disambiguation)
