= Disconnection =

Disconnection may refer to:

- Disconnection (album), by Strange Parcels, 1994
- The Disconnection, an album by Carina Round, 2003
- "Disconnection" (song), by Music for Pleasure, 1984
- Disconnection (Scientology)

== See also ==
- Connection (disambiguation)
- Emotional detachment, also known as emotional disconnection
- Disconnection syndrome, a neurological condition
- Disconnect (disambiguation)
- Disconnected (disambiguation)
- Disconnected graph, in graph theory
- Disconnected space, the opposite of connected space, in topology
