= Aerial stem modification =

Changes in the plant stem for adaption

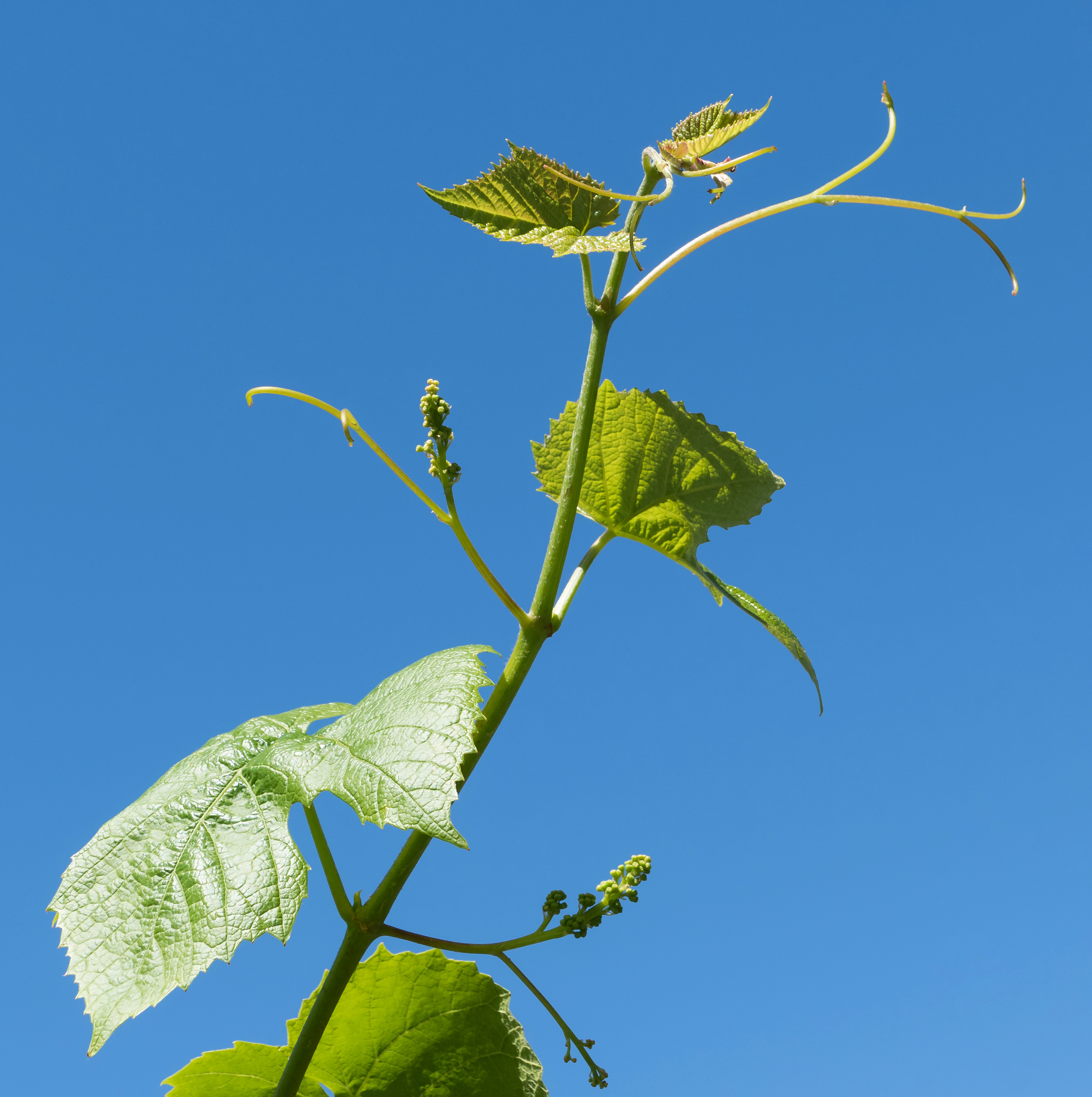
Grapevine tendrils and leaves.

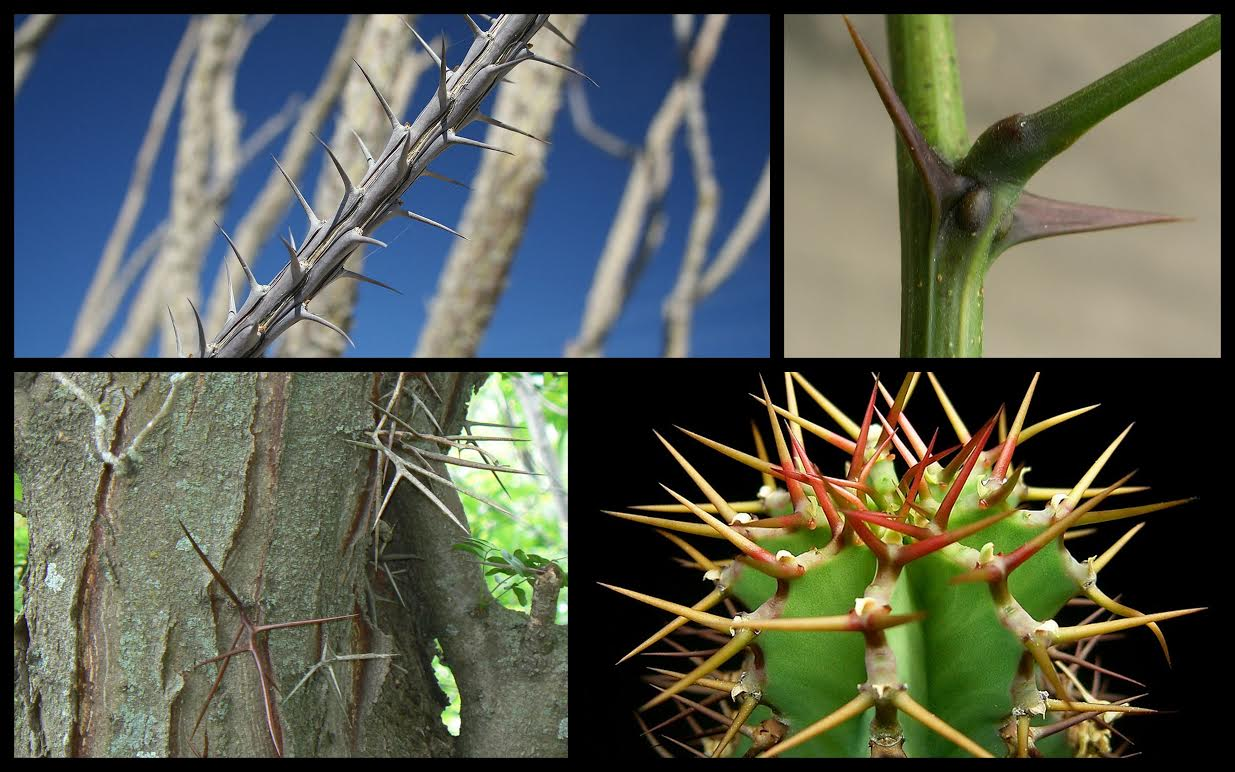
Thorns.

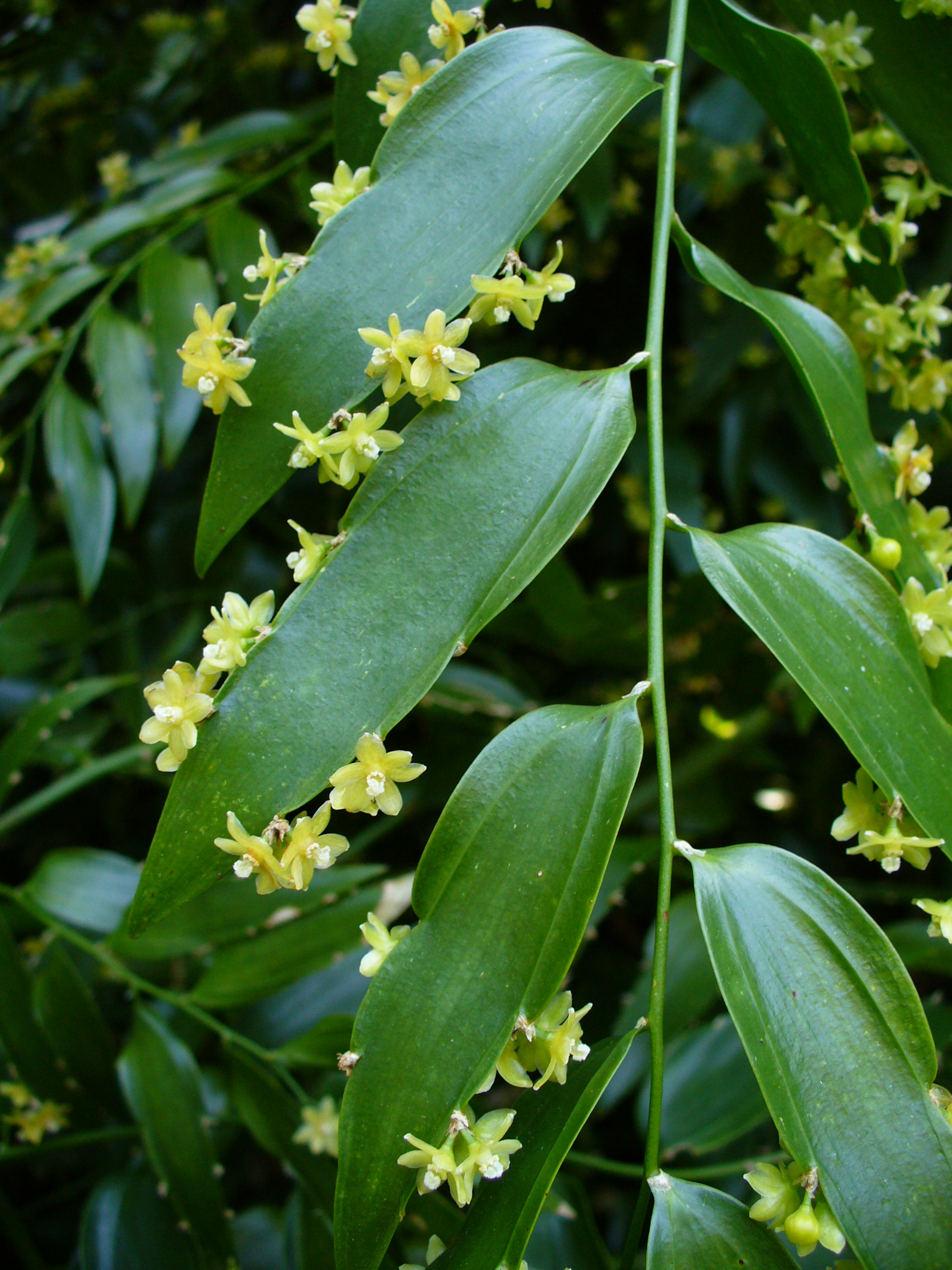
Cladodes.

Aerial stem modifications are modifications to the aerial stems, vegetative buds and floral buds of plants growing in different conditions and which perform functions such as climbing, protection, support, synthesis of food, or vegetative propagation. Aerial stem structures that undergo modifications to perform these special functions include tendrils, thorns, hooks, phylloclade, tuberous stems, and bulbils. The auxiliary or the terminal part of the modified structures shows their stem nature.

== Tendrils ==
Some weak-stemmed plants produce wiry, coiled, sensitive, and delicate organs for climbing. They are called tendrils. These may develop from either the axillary bud or the terminal bud of the stem. In Passiflora, the tendrils develop from the axillary bud. In Cissus quadrangularis and in Vitis vinifera, the terminal bud develops into tendrils.

== Thorns ==
These are hard, woody, pointed structures meant for protection. They are provided with vascular tissue, which may develop from the axillary bud or terminal buds. They control transpiration by reducing the vegetative growth. In Bougainvillea, Punica granatum, and Duranta, the axillary bud develop into thorns. In Duranta, the thorns are provided with leaves and flowers. In Punica granatum, the thorns bear leaves and branches. In Carissa carandas, the terminal bud produces a pair of thorns. They help in protection.

== Bulbils ==
When the axillary bud becomes fleshy and rounded due to the storage of food, it is called a bulb. It gets detached from the plant, falls on the ground, and develops into a new plant. e.g. Dioscorea. It is in the axil (the space between the leaf and stem).

== Cladode ==
These are green branches of limited growth (usually one internode long) that have taken over the functions of photosynthesis. True leaves are reduced to scales or spines, e.g. Asparagus.
