= John Henry Schaffner =

- Born: July 8, 1866; Agosta, Ohio
- Died: January 27, 1939 (aged 72); Columbus, Ohio
- Known for: Botany, Floral diagram, Reduction division
- Scientific career
- Fields: Botany
- Institutions: Ohio State University
- Author abbrev. (botany): J.H.Schaffn.

John Henry Schaffner (1866–1939) was an American botanist and professor at Ohio State University. He is known for his contributions to the floral diagram and for his work on reduction division. Schaffner is the botanical authority, for seven taxa that bear his name, such as Equisetum kansanum J.H.Schaffn..

== Bibliography ==
- Schaffner, John Henry (June 1916). "A General System of Floral Diagrams" (PDF). Ohio Journal of Science. 16 (8): 360–366. hdl:1811/1914. ISSN 0030-0950.
- Troyer, James R. (1989). "John Henry Schaffner (18661939) and Reduction Division in Plants: Legend and Fact". American Journal of Botany. 76 (8): 1229–1246. doi:10.1002/j.1537-2197.1989.tb15103.x. JSTOR 2444831.
- Waller, Adolph E. (May 1941). "Professor John Henry Schaffner" (PDF). Ohio Journal of Science. 41 (3): 253–286. hdl:1811/3171.
