= Disconnected =

Disconnected may refer to:

== Film ==
- Disconnected (1984 film), an American psychological slasher film
- Disconnected (2021 film), a Hong Kong action drama film

== Music ==
=== Albums ===
- Disconnected (The Buzzhorn album), or the title song, 2002
- Disconnected (Fates Warning album), or the title song, 2000
- Disconnected (Faust and Nurse with Wound album), or the title song, 2007
- Disconnected (Funkstörung album), or the title song, 2004
- Disconnected (Greymachine album), 2009
- Disconnected (Stiv Bators album), 1980
- Disconnected EP, by Profane Omen, or the title song, 2007
- Disconnected, by Beat Union, 2008
- Disconnected, by Chipzel, 2010
- Disconnected, by Dry Cell, 2002
- Disconnected, by the Dial-A-Poem Poets, 1974

=== Songs ===
- "Disconnected" (Face to Face song), 1993
- "Disconnected" (Keane song), 2012
- "Disconnected" (Queensrÿche song), 1994
- "Disconnected", by 5 Seconds of Summer from She Looks So Perfect EP, 2014
- "Disconnected", by Chase Atlantic from Lost in Heaven, 2024
- "Disconnected", by Idlewild from Warnings/Promises, 2005
- "Disconnected", by Inspector K from the music of the video game In the Groove
- "Disconnected", by Julian Lennon from Everything Changes, 2011
- "Disconnected", by Lindsay Lohan from Speak, 2004
- "Disconnected", by Rancid from Let the Dominoes Fall, 2009
- "Disconnected", by the Red Jumpsuit Apparatus, 2007
- "Disconnected", by Shy Child from Liquid Love, 2010
- "Disconnected", by Simple Minds from Cry, 2002
- "Disconnected (Out of Control)", by Trapt from Someone in Control, 2005

== See also ==
- Disconnected graph, in graph theory
- Disconnected space, the opposite of connected space, in topology
- Disconnect (disambiguation)
- Disconnection (disambiguation)
