= Connexion =

Connexion is a variant spelling of connection and may refer to:

== Technology and Internet ==
- Connexion by Boeing, an in-flight online connectivity service
- Connexions, also known as OpenStax CNX, a repository of open educational resources started at Rice University (1999-2022)
- Connexions Information Sharing Services, a library for the movements for social change in Canada, now online (1975-)
- ConneXions, parental advice company and terminated YouTube Channel involved in Ruby Franke sextuple aggravated child abuse case

== Religion ==
- Connexionalism, the theological understanding and foundation of Methodist ecclesiastical polity

== Music ==
- "Connexion", a track on Late Night Tales: Matt Helders DJ mix album
- "Connexion", a song by Zayn from his 2021 album Nobody Is Listening

== Other uses ==
- The Connexion, a monthly English-language newspaper for English-speakers in France
- Connexion (game show), a Tamil celebrity game show on Vijay TV in India
- Connexions (agency), a support service in the United Kingdom
- ConneXions Leadership Academy, a middle school in Baltimore, Maryland

== See also ==
- Connection (disambiguation)
- Connexxion, a transport company in the Netherlands
- Connexionsbuses, a Yorkshire bus operator
