= Conexión (band) =

Conexión were a seminal Spanish soul-jazz-rock band active 1969–1974. Influenced by American bands such as Blood, Sweat & Tears and Chicago Transit Authority, their best known singles were "I will pray" (1969), "Strong lover" (1969), "Un mundo sin amor" (1970), and "Preparad los caminos del señor" (1972) a Spanish cover from Godspell.

== Discography ==
- Conexión, Movieplay 1971
- Harmony, Movieplay 1973
