= Phone connector =

Phone connector, phone plug, or phone jack may refer to:

- Telephone plug, used to connect a telephone to the telephone wiring in a home or business, and in turn to a local telephone network
- Phone connector (audio), an audio jack, jack plug, stereo plug, mini-jack, mini-stereo, or headphone/phone jack

== See also ==
- RCA connector, also known as a phono connector
