= Todo Mundo (band) =

American world music band

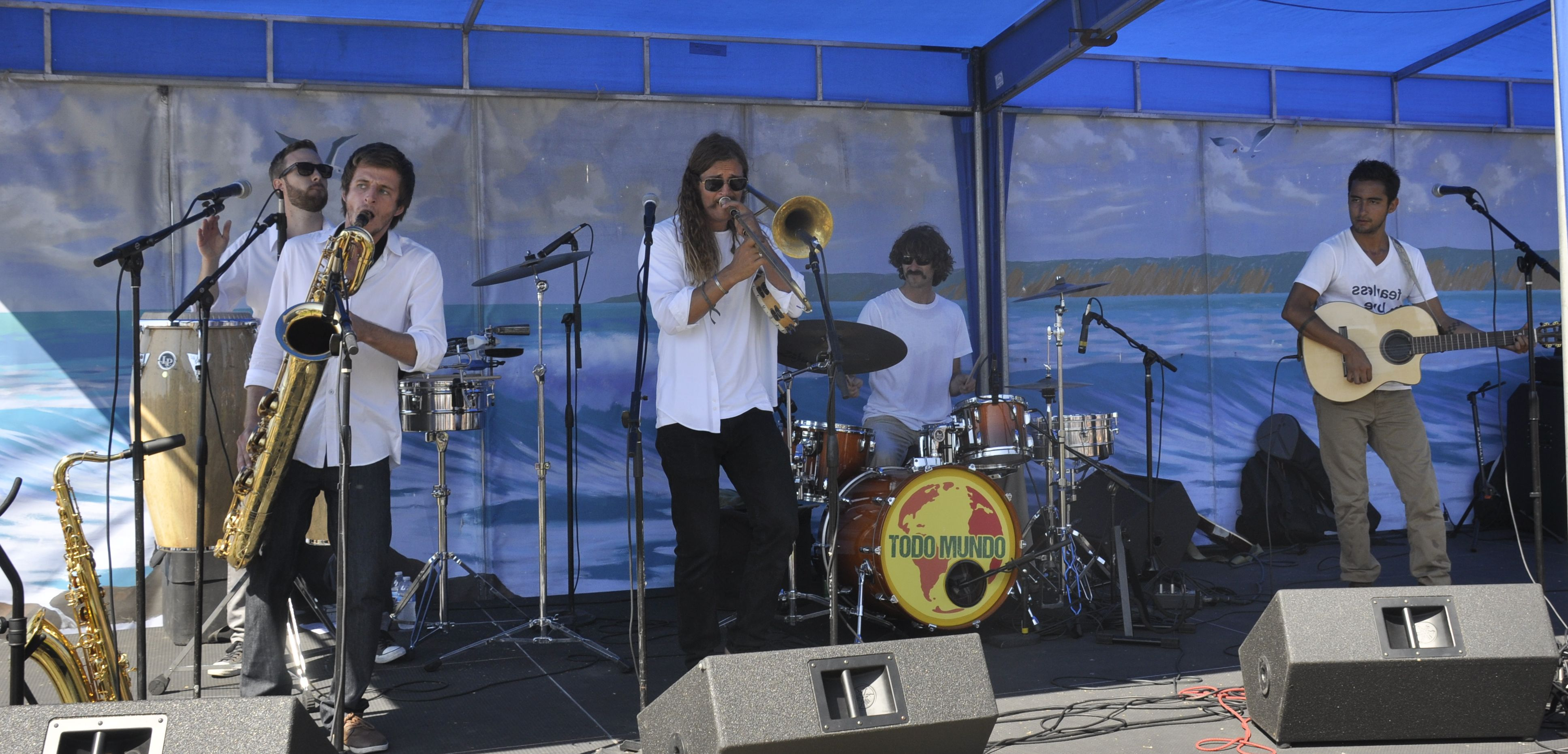
- Todo Mundo at La Jolla Cove August 17, 2014

Background information
- Origin: Argentina / San Diego
- Genres: World music; big band
- Years active: 2009–present
- Members: Santiago Orozco; Stephen Gentillalli; Matt Bozzone; Jacob Russo; Brad Nash; Willie Fleming
- Website: www.todomundomusic.com www.facebook.com/todomundo

Todo Mundo ("All the World") is a San Diego based six-piece music band fronted by Santiago Orozco, which plays world music blending pop, reggae, rock, gypsy, Caribbean and Latin music. The band was originally created by Orozco in Argentina in 2009 and recreated in 2010 in San Diego.

== Albums and awards ==
- Organic Fire (2011) album won Best World Music Album at the 2011 San Diego Music Awards.
- Conexion (15 October 2013) won Best World Music Album at the 2014 San Diego Music Awards, while the band was recognized as Best World Music Band.
