= The Connection =

The Connection may refer to:

- The Connection (band), a rock n roll band from Portsmouth, New Hampshire, US
- The Connection (play), by Jack Gelber, performed by the Living Theater
  - The Music from "The Connection", an album by the Freddie Redd Quartet, recorded as the soundtrack for the play
  - Music from the Connection, a jazz music album by Howard McGhee
  - The Connection (1961 film), a film adapted from the Gelber play
- The Connection, largely false 1996 documentary exposed by The Guardian
- The Connection (DeLon album), 2005
- The Connection (Papa Roach album), 2012
- The Connection (radio program), NPR, US, 1994–2005
- "The Connection", song on Phish's 2004 album Undermind
- The Connection (1961 film)
- The Connection (1973 film), an American TV movie
- The Connection (2014 film), a historical crime action thriller film

== See also ==
- Connection (disambiguation)
