= The Connexion =

- Format: News website with a monthly print edition
- Owner: English Language Media Sarl.
- Editor-in-chief: Sarah Smith
- Founded: 2002; 24 years ago
- Language: English
- Headquarters: Monaco
- Website: connexionfrance.com

The Connexion is France's leading English-language media and has been providing news and practical updates about the country since 2002.

It is a primary source of information for anyone established or new to France. Its main readership is British and American. All its publications are in English. Its Saturday e-newsletter for subscribers is devoted to answering readers' questions about France. It also publishes and sells an annually updated range of digital help guides covering French visas and residency cards, healthcare, taxation and inheritance.

It currently claims over 31,000 recurring paying subscribers. More than 110,000 readers receive its newsletters.

Its website connexionfrance.com receives around 500,000 unique visitors and 2,000,000 page views every month. More than 25,000 copies of the Connexion are printed monthly and sold through over 4,500 newsagents and supermarkets across France as well as by subscription.

The media group is independently owned.

== Content ==
Connexionfrance.com features daily coverage of French headlines, selecting what its readership needs to know as foreign residents as well as providing regular practical updates on key practical topics such as visas and residency, healthcare, taxation, driving and property ownership and renting. There is also a French language expression of the day.

The Connexion monthly publication features independent reporting on issues close to its readers as well as a 'Readers' Letters and Comment' section. Each edition contains a 24-page French Living supplement of articles exploring different areas of France, lifestyle pieces, recipes, tips for improving your French and culture piece as well as bilingual crosswords and a quiz.
