= Connector (mathematics) =

In mathematics, a connector is a map which can be defined for a linear connection and used to define the covariant derivative on a vector bundle from the linear connection.

== Definition ==
Let ∇ be a connection on the tangent space TN of a smooth manifold N. For smooth mappings h:M→TN from any smooth manifold M, the connector K:TTN→TN satisfies : ∇ h = K○Th:TM→TN where Th:TM→TTN is the differential of h.
