= Floral diagram =

Formal schematic description of floral anatomy

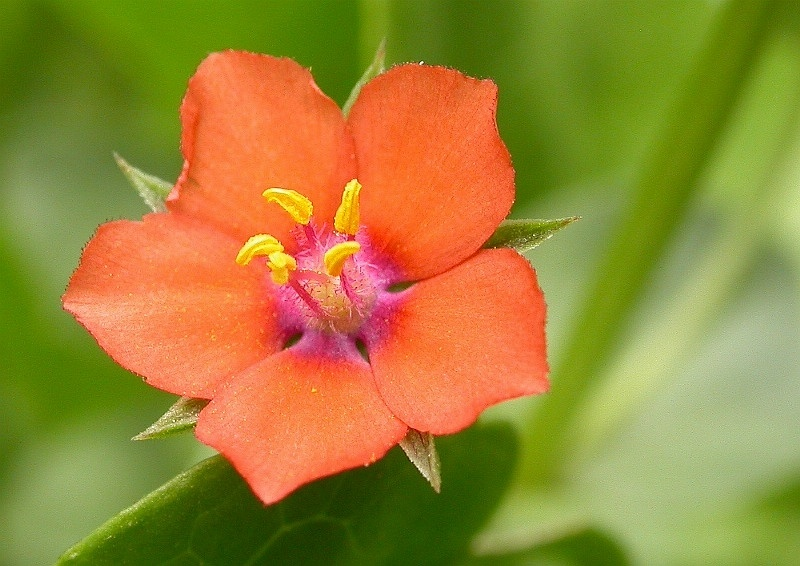

- Floral diagram of Anagallis arvensis. The dot represents the main axis, green structure below is the subtending bract. Calyx (green arcs) consists of five free sepals; corolla (red arcs) consists of five fused petals. Antepetalous stamens are joined to petals by hairy filaments. Ovary is superior, placentation is free central and the ovules are atropous.

A floral diagram is a graphic representation of the structure of a flower. It shows the number of floral organs, their arrangement and fusion. Different parts of the flower are represented by their respective symbols. Floral diagrams are useful for flower identification or can help in understanding angiosperm evolution. They were introduced in the late 19th century and are generally attributed to A. W. Eichler.

They are typically used with the floral formula of that flower to study its morphology.

== History ==
In the 19th century, two contrasting methods of describing the flower were introduced: the textual floral formulae and pictorial floral diagrams. Floral diagrams are credited to A. W. Eichler, whose extensive work Blüthendiagramme (1875, 1878) remains a valuable source of information on floral morphology. Eichler inspired later generations of scientists, including John Henry Schaffner. Diagrams were included e.g. in Types of Floral Mechanism by Arthur Church (1908). They were used in different textbooks, e.g. Organogenesis of Flowers by Rolf Sattler (1973), Botanische Bestimmungsübungen by Stützel (2006) or Plant Systematics by Simpson (2010). Floral Diagrams (2010) by Ronse De Craene followed Eichler’s approach using the contemporary (Note: APG II was contemporary at the time of book’s writing.) APG II system.

== Basic characteristics and significance ==
A floral diagram is a schematic cross-section through a young flower. It may be also defined as “projection of the flower perpendicular to its axis”. It usually shows the number of floral parts, (Note: It also shows organs that are not part of the flower, but may be closely associated with it, such as bracts and bracteoles.) their sizes, relative positions and fusion. Different organs are represented by distinguishable symbols, which may be uniform for one organ type, or may reflect concrete morphology. The diagram may also include symbols that don’t represent physical structures, but carry additional information (e.g. symmetry plane orientation).

There is no agreement on how floral diagrams should be drawn, it depends on the author whether it is just a rough representation, or whether structural details of the flower are included.

Diagrams can describe the ontogeny of flowers, or can show evolutionary relationships. They can be generalized to show the typical floral structure of a taxon. It is also possible to represent (partial) inflorescences by diagrams.

A substantial amount of information may be included in a good diagram. It can be useful for flower identification or comparison between angiosperm taxa. Paleontologists can take advantage of diagrams for reconstruction of fossil flowers. Floral diagrams are also of didactic value.

Relation of a plant material (Campanula medium) to the floral diagram. Black dashed line shows the cross-section. 1 – position of the main axis; 2 – cross-section through the lateral flower; 3 – bracteole; 4 – subtending bract.

== Orientation ==
Diagrams are usually depicted with the subtending bract below and the axis above the flower itself, both in the median line. The axis corresponds to the position of the main stem relative to a lateral flower. When a terminal flower is depicted, the axis is not present and therefore cannot be shown. Bracteoles, if they are present, are usually drawn on the sides of the diagram.

== Symbols used in diagrams ==
Not only the information contained within diagrams, but also their appearance commonly varies between authors. Some publications include an overview of symbols used.

=== Bracts and bracteoles, axes ===
Bracts and bracteoles are commonly shown as arcs. In Floral Diagrams by Ronse De Craene they consistently have a black fill and a little triangle on the outer side to distinguish them from the perianth. In Eichler’s Blüthendiagramme their representation alters between diagrams.

Ronse De Craene	Eichler
	inconsistent

The axis relative to the flower is shown as black circle in Floral Diagrams. When inflorescence is depicted, the position of its main stem is illustrated by a crossed circle. Eichler’s depiction of axes alternates between diagrams.

	Ronse De Craene	Eichler
axis relative to the flower		inconsistent
main stem of an inflorescence		inconsistent

=== Perianth ===
Perianth parts are also shown as arcs. They may be colored according to their type. In Blüthendiagramme the tepals are usually white with black stroke, sepals are hatched and petals are black. Ronse De Craene implies that it may be sometimes impossible to classify the organs, he shows green perianth parts as black and pigmented as white. Estivation can be accurately shown in the diagram.

Ronse De Craene	Eichler
for sepals or sepaloid tepals for petals or petaloid tepals/sepals	for tepals for sepals for petals

=== Androecium ===
Stamens are represented by a cross-section through anthers. In case there are many stamens in the flower, they can be simplified and drawn as circles. Staminodes have a small black circle inside or are painted black in Floral Diagrams, Eichler also fills them black.

	Ronse De Craene	Eichler
stamen	or	
staminode	or	

=== Gynoecium ===
The pistil is shown as a sectional view of the ovary. Ovary position is highlighted by small triangles in Floral Diagrams. Ronse De Craene also incorporates ovule morphology or shows the position of stigmatic lobes by white shapes.

	Ronse De Craene	Eichler
superior ovary		
inferior ovary		
half-inferior ovary		

=== Nectaries ===
In Floral Diagrams, nectaries are filled by grey color, Eichler fills them by hatching.

=== Other ===
Fusion can be shown in diagrams by full connecting lines between organs. Lost organs can be represented by a star (✶), lost perianth parts or bracts/bracteoles can be shown with dashed stroke. It is possible to show the direction of monosymmetry by a large arrow. Resupination may be illustrated by a curved arrow. Floral parts can be accompanied by numbers to show their sequence of initialization.

== Floral diagrams and floral formulae ==
Each of these two concepts is better in expressing some information. Floral diagrams can show the size and relative position of the organs and the reproductive organs. On the other hand, floral formulae are capable of broader generalization. Prenner et al. view them as complementary methods and state they make an “identikit” flower when utilized together. Ronse De Craene also approves of their combined use.

== Examples ==
Partial inflorescence of Theobroma cacao	Floral diagram of Pyrus communis
Partial inflorescence of Theobroma cacao (after Ronse De Craene). Floral formula: ✶ K5 C5 A(5°+5²) G(5)	Floral diagram of Pyrus communis (after Eichler). Floral formula: ✶ K(5) C5 A10+5+5 Ğ(4)

== See also ==
- Floral formulae
- Flower
- Floral organs
- Dicot flower
- Monocot flower
- inflorescence

== Bibliography ==
- Schaffner, John Henry (June 1916). "A General System of Floral Diagrams" (PDF). Ohio Journal of Science. 16 (8): 360–366. hdl:1811/1914. ISSN 0030-0950.
