= Connective (botany) =

Portion of sterile tissue between thecae

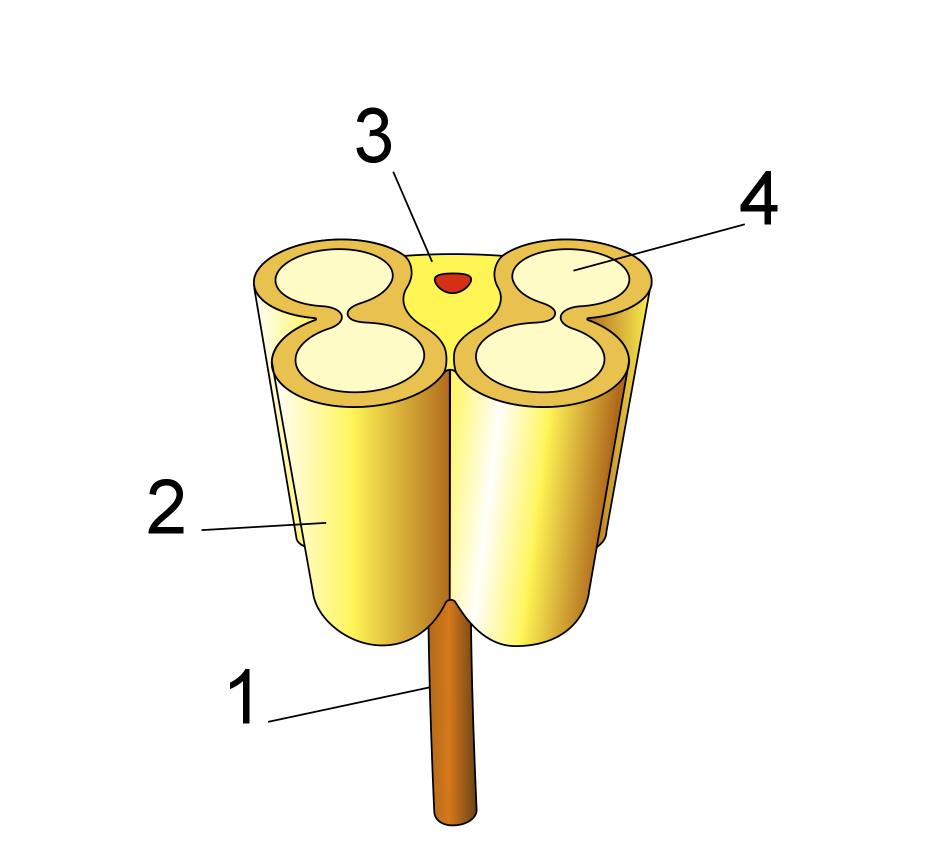
Schematic cross section of an anther. 1: Filament 2: Theca 3: Connective 4: Pollen sac (also known as sporangium)

In botany, the connective is the portion of sterile (i.e. nonreproductive) tissue of the anther between and interconnecting the two thecae, which forms a body with them and holds them together. It is usually underdeveloped and it is subject to great diversity of form, causing the thecae to protrude prominently. In some primitive angiosperms, the entire stamen may be more or less foliaceous, and the connective may be highly developed, causing the thecae to be widely separated. It appears to be analogous to the midrib of a leaf, and is only absent when an anther is strictly one-celled; that is to say, when the whole of the interior of the end of the stamen is converted into pollen. In some cases, the tissue has appendages of various shapes that are of structural importance (e.g., in the Melastomataceae or Prostantheroideae).
