= Connection =

Connection may refer to:

Internet connection or access to the Internet.

== Mathematics and Engineering ==
- Connection (algebraic framework)
- Connection (mathematics), a way of specifying a derivative of a geometrical object along a vector field on a manifold
- Connection (affine bundle)
- Connection (composite bundle)
- Connection (fibred manifold)
- Connection (principal bundle), gives the derivative of a section of a principal bundle
- Connection (vector bundle), differentiates a section of a vector bundle along a vector field
- Cartan connection, achieved by identifying tangent spaces with the tangent space of a certain model Klein geometry
- Ehresmann connection, gives a manner for differentiating sections of a general fibre bundle
- Electrical connection, allows the flow of electrons
- Galois connection, a type of correspondence between two partially ordered sets
- Affine connection, a geometric object on a smooth manifold which connects nearby tangent spaces
- Levi-Civita connection, used in differential geometry and general relativity; differentiates a vector field along another vector field

== Music ==
- Connection (The Green Children album), 2013
- Connection (Don Ellis album), 1972
- Connection (Up10tion album), 2021
- Connection (Home Grown and Limbeck EP), a 2000 split EP by Home Grown and Limbeck
- Connection (Onew EP), a 2025 EP by Onew
- Connection, a 2019 EP by Seyong
- "Connection" (Elastica song) (1994)
- "Connection" (OneRepublic song) (2018)
- "Connection" (Rolling Stones song) (1967)
- "Connection", a song by Avail from Satiate
- "Connection", a 1976 song by Can from Unlimited Edition
- "Connection", a song by the Kooks from 10 Tracks to Echo in the Dark (2022)

== Other uses ==
- The Connection, a 1961 film by Shirley Clarke
- Connection (film), a 2017 Konkani film in Goa
- Connection (TV series), a 2024 South Korean television series
- Connection (dance), a means of communication between the lead and the follow
- Layover or connection, a transfer from one means of transport to another

== See also ==
- Connected sum
- Connectedness
- Connecting (TV series)
- Connections (disambiguation)
- Connexion (disambiguation)
- Contiguity (disambiguation)
- Database connection
- Disconnection (disambiguation)
- Link (disambiguation)
- PC Connection, a Fortune 1000, National Technology Solutions Provider, based in Merrimack, New Hampshire
- Rapport
- Six degrees of separation
- Telecommunication circuit, the complete path between two terminals
- The Connection (disambiguation)
- Virtual connection, also known as a virtual circuit
