= Floral formula =

Notation representing flowers' structure

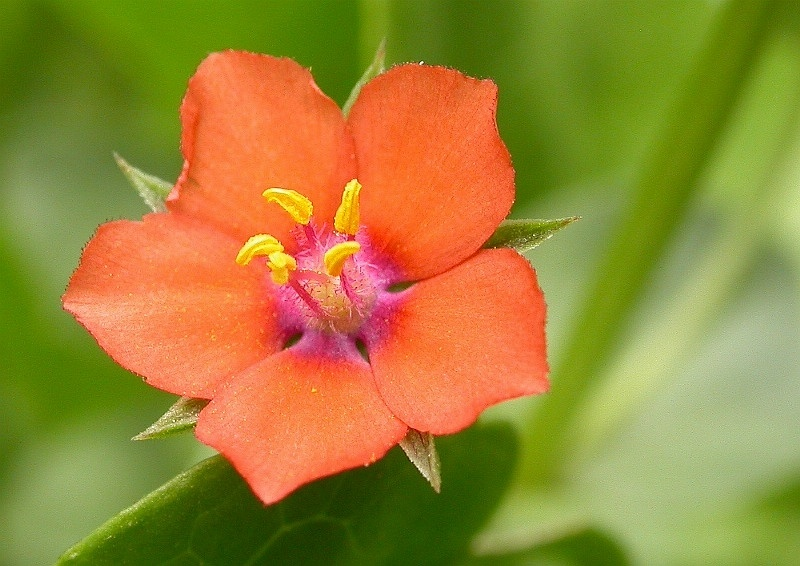
- ✶ K5 [C(5) A5] G(5)
- Floral formula of Anagallis arvensis. Polysymmetric flower. The perianth consists of 5 free sepals and 5 joined petals, which are fused with androecium. The flower is bisexual, it contains 5 stamens, the pistil is fused of five carpels, and the ovary is superior.

A floral formula is a notation for representing the structure of particular types of flowers. Such notations use numbers, letters and various symbols to convey significant information in a compact form. They may represent the floral form of a particular species, or may be generalized to characterize higher taxa, usually giving ranges of numbers of organs. Floral formulae are one of the two ways of describing flower structure developed during the 19th century, the other being floral diagrams. The format of floral formulae differs according to the tastes of particular authors and periods, yet they tend to convey the same information.

A floral formula is often used along with a floral diagram.

== History ==
Floral formulae were developed at the beginning of the 19th century. The first authors using them were Cassel (1820), who first devised lists of integers to denote numbers of parts in named whorls, and Martius (1828). Grisebach (1854) used 4-integer series to represent the 4 whorls of floral parts in his textbook to describe characteristics of floral families, stating numbers of different organs separated by commas and highlighting fusion. Sachs (1873) used them together with floral diagrams; he noted their advantage of being composed of "ordinary typeface".

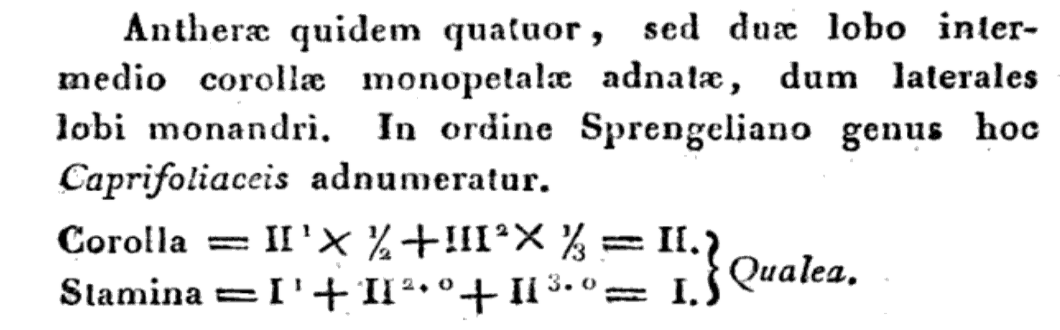
Cassel formula

Although Eichler widely used floral diagrams in his Blüthendiagramme, he used floral formulae sparingly, mainly for families with simple flowers. Sattler's Organogenesis of Flowers (1973) takes advantage of floral formulae and diagrams to describe the ontogeny of 50 plant species. Newer books containing formulae include Plant Systematics by Judd et al. (2002) and Simpson (2010). Prenner et al. devised an extension of the existing model to broaden the descriptive capability of the formula and argued that formulae should be included in formal taxonomic descriptions. Ronse De Craene (2010) partially utilized their way of writing the formulae in his book Floral Diagrams.

== Contained information ==
=== Organ numbers and fusion ===
The formula expresses counts of different floral organs; (Note: Bracts and bracteoles are not considered parts of the flower itself, yet they may be included in the floral formula) these are usually preceded by letters or abbreviations according to the organ type. They are ordered corresponding to the arrangement of the parts of the flower from the outside to the inside:

Bracts	Bracteoles	Tepals (perigon or perianth), or sepals (calyx) and petals (corolla)		Stamens (androecium)	Carpels (gynoecium)	Ovules
B	Bt	P or CaCo		A	G	V or O
B	Bt	K or Ca	C or Co	A	G	V or O

The labels with darker backgrounds are less common. "V" used by Prenner et al. for the number of ovules per gynoecium is followed by lowercase letter describing the type of placentation. For epicalyx/calyculus, the letter "k" is used.

The numbers are inserted after the labels, they may be formatted as sub- or superscript. If an organ is absent, its number is written as "0" or it is omitted, if there are "many" (usually more than 10–12) instances, it can be written as "∞". Whorls of the same organ are separated by "+". Organ counts within a whorl can be separated by ":", for example when part of the whorl is morphologically different. A range can be given if the number is variable, e.g. when the formula summarizes a taxon.

- K_{3+3} – a calyx with six free sepals, arranged as two separate whorls
- A∞ – many stamens
- P3–12 – perianth from three to twelve petals

Groups of organs can be described by writing the number of instances in the group as superscript.

A5² – 5 groups of 2 stamens

The formula can also express organ fusion. Fusion of one organ type can be shown by enclosing the number in a circle, fusion of different organs can be represented by ties, as e.g. in Judd et al. Prenner et al. state that this method is difficult to achieve via standard typesetting. Joining of organs can be more readily written using parentheses "(…)" if instances of the same organ are fused. Fusion between different organs can be achieved by square "[…]", eventually curly brackets "{…}".

- A(5) – five fused stamens
- [C(5) A5] – corolla fused from 5 petals, fused to stamens

Prenner et al. propose superscript zero for a lost organ, and superscript "r" for a reduced one. Ronse De Craene uses a degree symbol to mark a staminode (infertile stamen) or pistillode (infertile carpel).

- A3:2^{r}+5^{0} – (Prenner et al.) androecium in two whorls, first contains 3 stamens and 2 staminodes, second whorl lost
- A1+2° – (Ronse De Craene) androecium in two whorls, first whorl containing a stamen, second whorl containing two stamens in Ovary position

Ovary position is shown by alternating the "G" label. Simpson circumvents the intricate formatting by expressing the ovary position by words.

	superior ovary	inferior ovary	half-inferior ovary
Prenner et al., Ronse De Craene	G	Ĝ, Ğ	-G-
Sattler	G	G̅	~~G~~
Simpson	G…, superior	G…, inferior	G…, half-inferior

=== Symmetry ===
Symmetry or arrangement may be described for the whole flower; in such case the corresponding symbol is usually placed at the beginning of the formula. It may be also outlined separately for different organs, placing it after their labels or numbers, or it may not be included in the formula at all. It is described by following symbols:

	polysymmetry (actinomorphic)	disymmetry	monosymmetry (zygomorphic)	asymmetry	spiral arrangement
Prenner et al.	*	┼	↓, → or Ø, depending on the symmetry plane orientation	∂	not mentioned
Ronse De Craene	✶	↔	↓, arrow orientation depending on symmetry plane orientation	↯	↺
Sattler	✳	+	∙|∙	↯	not mentioned
Judd et al.	*	not mentioned	X	$	not mentioned
Subrahmanyam	⊕	not mentioned	% in median plane, ÷ in lateral plane	not mentioned	not mentioned
Rosypal	✳	⤧	↓	↯	

=== Sexuality ===
Sexuality of the flower can be highlighted by ☿ or ⚥ for hermaphrodite (bisexual), ♂ for male (staminate) and ♀ for female (pistillate) flower. The symbols are usually placed at the beginning of the formula, after or before the symmetry symbol. Prenner et al. recommend to use the corresponding symbols (♀ and ♂) only for flowers of separate sexuality. Ronse De Craene utilizes the words "pistillate" or "staminate" instead of the symbols.

Floral formula can also incorporate the fruit type; Judd et al. place it at the very end.

== Examples ==
↯ K3 [C3 A1°–3°+½:2°] Ğ(3) – the formula of Canna indica; asymmetric flower; calyx of three free sepals; corolla of three free petals joined with androecium; androecium in two whorls, the outer whorl contains 1–3 staminodes, the inner contains ½ of a stamen and 2 staminodes; gynoecium fused of 3 carpels, inferior ovary

B Bt^{C} K3:(2)^{C}↓ C3:2^{r}↓ A(3):2^{r}↓+4^{r}:1^{0} G1↓ Vm8–10 – the formula of Tamarindus indica; bract and petaloid bracteoles; monosymmetric calyx of three and two petaloid sepals; monosymmetric corolla of three and two reduced petals; two whorls of stamens, the outer monosymmetric from three fused and two reduced stamens, the inner of 4 reduced and 1 lost stamen; monosymmetric gynoecium of 1 carpel with superior ovary; marginal placentation with 8–10 ovules per gynoecium.

=== Using boxes ===
- Narcissus; Floral formula
- Br ✶ ☿ P3+3+Corolla A3+3 G(3); Bracteate, Actinomorphic, Bisexual; Perianth: 6 tepals in 2 whorls of 3 Stamens: 2 whorls of 3 Ovary: Superior - 3 fused carpels

✶ P3+3 A3+3 G(3)
Liliaceae Floral formula
Flowers actinomorphic and hermaphrodite with 6 undifferentiated tepals in two whorls of three, the same number and arrangement of stamens, and a superior ovary with 3 fused carpels. Individual species and genera may have more or less derived formulas.

- Haloragaceae; Floral formula
- ✶$\mathrm{K}^{3-4}$$\mathrm{C}^{3-4}$ or $\mathrm{C}^0$$\mathrm{A}^{2-8}$$\mathrm{G}^{\overline{(2-4)}}$ 3-4 free sepals, 3-4 free petals (or absent), 2-8 stamens, inferior ovary with 2-4 fused carpels

== See also ==
- Floral diagram

== Bibliography ==
- N S Subrahmanyam, Modern Plant Taxonomy, Vikas Publishing House Pvt Ltd, 2009. ISBN 0706993462
