= Patrick Moore =

English astronomer, broadcaster and writer (1923–2012)

Sir Patrick Moore CBE HonFRS FRAS
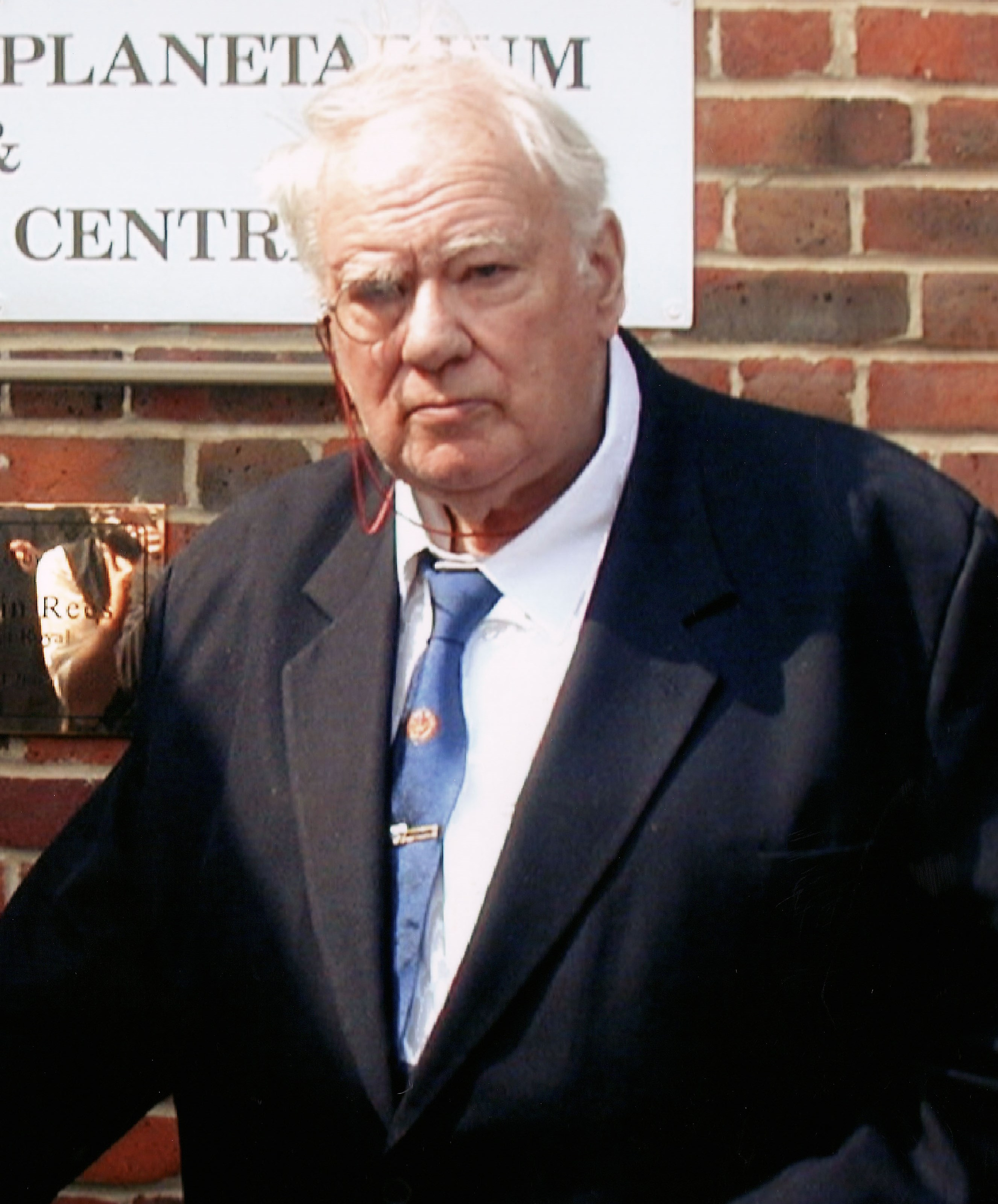
- Moore in 2002
- Born: Patrick Alfred Caldwell-Moore; 4 March 1923; Pinner, Middlesex, England
- Died: 9 December 2012 (aged 89); Selsey, West Sussex, England
- Resting place: Chichester, West Sussex, England
- Known for: The Sky at Night
- Awards: Knight Bachelor; Commander of the Order of the British Empire; Honorary Fellow of the Royal Society; Fellow of the Royal Astronomical Society
- Scientific career
- Fields: Astronomy
- Workplaces: Royal Air Force; BBC; British Astronomical Association
- Military career
- Allegiance: United Kingdom
- Branch: Royal Air Force
- Service years: 1940–45
- Rank: Pilot officer
- Conflicts: Second World War

Sir Patrick Alfred Caldwell-Moore (Note: This British person has the barrelled surname Caldwell-Moore, but is known by the surname Moore.) (/ˈkɔːldwɛl/; 4 March 1923 – 9 December 2012) was an English astronomer who attained prominence in that field as a writer, researcher, radio commentator and television presenter.

Moore's early interest in astronomy led him to join the British Astronomical Association at the age of 11. He served in the Royal Air Force during World War II and briefly taught before publishing his first book on lunar observation in 1953. Renowned for his expertise in Moon observation and the creation of the Caldwell catalogue, Moore authored more than seventy astronomy books. He hosted the world's longest-running television series with the original presenter, BBC's The Sky at Night, from 1957 until his death in 2012. Idiosyncrasies such as his rapid diction and monocle made him a popular and instantly recognisable figure on British television. Moore was co-founder and president of the Society for Popular Astronomy.

Outside his field of astronomy, Moore appeared in the video game television show GamesMaster. Moore was also a self-taught xylophonist and pianist, as well as an accomplished composer. In addition to many popular science books, he wrote numerous works of fiction. He was an opponent of fox hunting, an outspoken critic of the European Union and a supporter of the UK Independence Party, and he served as chairman of the short-lived anti-immigration United Country Party. He was knighted in 2001.

== Early life ==
Moore was born in Pinner, Middlesex, on 4 March 1923 to Captain Charles Trachsel Caldwell-Moore (died 1947) and Gertrude (née White) (died 1981). His family moved to Bognor Regis, and subsequently to East Grinstead where he spent his childhood. His youth was marked by heart problems, which left him in poor health, and he was educated at home by private tutors. He developed an interest in astronomy at the age of six and joined the British Astronomical Association at the age of 11. He was invited to run a small observatory in East Grinstead at the age of 14, after his mentor, William Sadler Franks – who ran the observatory – was killed in a road accident. At the age of 16, he began wearing a monocle after an oculist told him his right eye was weaker than his left.

During World War II, Moore joined the Home Guard in East Grinstead, where his father had been elected platoon commander. Records show that he enlisted in the Royal Air Force Volunteer Reserve in December 1941 at age 18 and was not called up for service until July 1942 as an aircraftman, 2nd class. After basic training at various RAF bases in England, he went to Canada under the British Commonwealth Air Training Plan. He completed training at RAF Moncton in New Brunswick as a navigator and pilot. Returning to England in June 1944, he was commissioned as a pilot officer and was posted to RAF Millom in Cumberland, where he claimed to have been a navigator in the crew of a Vickers Wellington bomber engaged in maritime patrolling and bombing missions to mainland Europe, though in fact he was still in training at Millom. He was only posted to Bomber Command five days before the end of the war in Europe. After the end of hostilities, Moore became an adjutant and then an Area Meteorological Officer, demobilising in October 1945 with the rank of flying officer.

== Career in astronomy ==
After the war, Moore rejected a grant to study at the University of Cambridge, citing a wish to "stand on my own two feet". He wrote his first book, Guide to the Moon (later retitled Patrick Moore on the Moon) in 1952, and it was published a year later. He was a teacher in Woking and at Holmewood House School in Langton Green in Kent from 1945 to 1953. His second book was a translation of a work of French astronomer Gérard de Vaucouleurs (Moore spoke fluent French). After his second original science book, Guide to the Planets, he wrote his first work of fiction, The Master of the Moon, the first of numerous young adult fiction space adventure books (including the late 1970s series the Scott Saunders Space Adventure); he wrote a more adult novel and a farce titled Ancient Lights, though he did not wish either to be published. Moore also translated the book Quanta by J Lochak and Andrade E Silva, published in 1969, from the French.

While teaching at Holmewood, he set up a 12½ inch reflector telescope at his home, which he kept into his old age. He developed a particular interest in the far side of the Moon, a small part of which is visible from Earth as a result of the Moon's libration; the Moon was his specialist subject throughout his life. Moore described the short-lived glowing areas on the lunar surface and gave them the name transient lunar phenomena in 1968.

His first television appearance was in a debate about the existence of flying saucers following a spate of reported sightings in the 1950s; Moore argued against Lord Dowding and other UFO proponents. He was invited to present a live astronomy programme and said the greatest difficulty was finding an appropriate theme tune; the opening of Jean Sibelius's Pelléas et Mélisande was chosen and used throughout the programme's existence. The programme was originally named Star Map before The Sky at Night was chosen in the Radio Times. On 24 April 1957, at 10:30 pm, Moore presented the first episode about the Comet Arend–Roland. The programme was pitched to casual viewers up to professional astronomers, in a format which remained consistent from its inception. Moore presented every monthly episode except one in July 2004, when he suffered a near-fatal bout of food poisoning caused by eating a contaminated goose egg. For that episode, he was replaced by Chris Lintott. Moore appears in the Guinness World Records book as the world's longest-serving TV presenter having presented the programme since 1957. From 2004 to 2012, the programme was broadcast from Moore's home when arthritis prevented him from travelling to the studios. Over the years, he received many lucrative offers to take his programme onto other networks but rejected them because he held a 'gentlemen's agreement' with the BBC.

In 1959, the Russians allowed Moore to be the first Westerner to see the photographic results of the Luna 3 probe and to show them live on air. Less successful was the transmission of the Luna 4 probe, which ran into technical difficulties and around this time, Moore famously swallowed a large fly; both episodes were live, and Moore had to continue regardless. Moore wrote that he visited the Soviet Union, where he met Yuri Gagarin, the first man to journey into outer space. For the fiftieth episode of The Sky at Night, in September 1961, Moore's attempt to be the first to broadcast a live direct telescopic view of a planet resulted in another unintended 'comedy episode', as cloud obscured the sky.

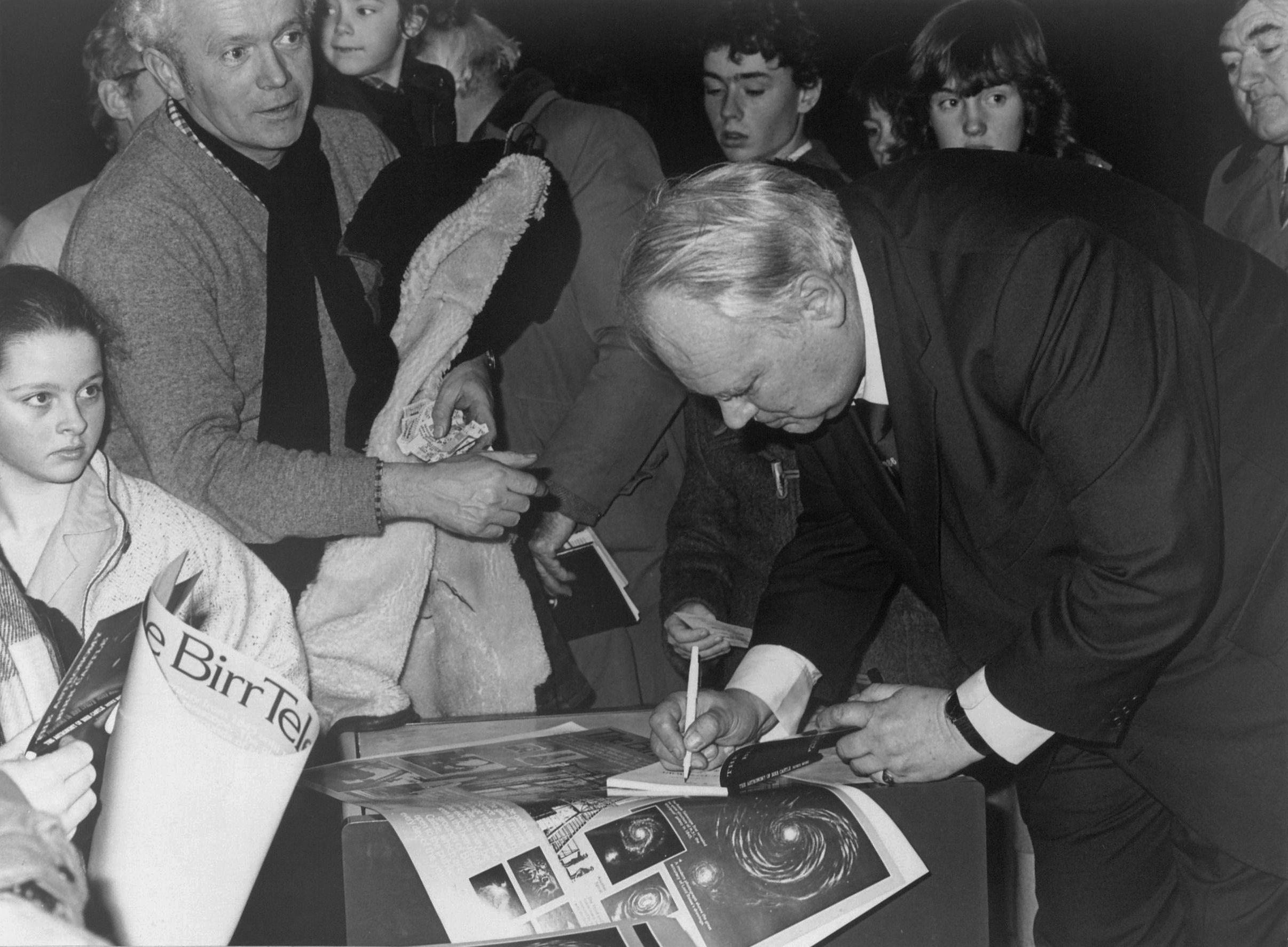
Patrick Moore signing his book The Astronomy of Birr Castle at NIHE - 1985

In 1965, he was appointed director of the newly constructed Armagh Planetarium in Northern Ireland, a post he held until 1968. His stay outside England was short partly because of the beginning of The Troubles, a dispute Moore wanted no involvement in. He was appointed Armagh County secretary of the Scout movement but resigned after being informed that Catholics could not be admitted. In developing the Planetarium, Moore travelled to Japan to secure a Goto Mars projector. He helped with the redevelopment of the Birr Telescope in the Republic of Ireland. In his autobiography, Moore writes that he was a key figure in the development of the Herschel Museum of Astronomy in Bath.

In June 1968, he returned to England, settling in Selsey after resigning from his post in Armagh. During the NASA Apollo programme, presenting on the Apollo 8 mission, he declared that "this is one of the great moments of human history", only to have his broadcast interrupted by the children's programme Jackanory. He was a presenter for the Apollo 9 and Apollo 10 missions, and a commenter, with Cliff Michelmore and James Burke, for BBC television's coverage of the Moon landing missions. Moore could not remember his words at the "Eagle has landed" moment, and the BBC lost the tapes of the broadcast. A homemade recording reveals that the studio team was very quiet during the landing sequence, leaving the NASA commentary clear of interruptions. Some 14 seconds after "contact", Burke says "They've touched." At 36 seconds, he says, "Eagle has landed." Between 53 and 62 seconds, he explains the upcoming stay/no-stay decision, and NASA announces the T1 stay at 90 seconds after contact. At 100 seconds, the recorded sequence ends. Thus, any real-time comment Moore made was not broadcast live, and the recording ends before Burke polls the studio team for comment and reaction. Moore participated in TV coverage of Apollo missions 12 to 17.

"Patrick was the last of a lost generation, a true gentleman, the most generous in nature that I ever knew, and an inspiration to thousands in his personal life, and to millions through his 50 years of unique broadcasting. It's no exaggeration to say that Patrick, in his tireless and ebullient communication of the magic of astronomy, inspired every British astronomer, amateur and professional, for half a century. There will never be another Patrick Moore. But we were lucky enough to get one."

— Brian May, speaking shortly after Moore's death

He was elected a member of the International Astronomical Union in 1966; having twice edited the Union's General Assembly newsletters. He attempted to establish an International Union of Amateur Astronomers, which failed due to lack of interest. During the 1970s and 80s, he reported on the Voyager and Pioneer programs, often from NASA headquarters. At this time he became increasingly annoyed by conspiracy theorists and reporters who asked him questions such as "Why waste money on space research when there is so much to be done here?". He said that when asked these types of questions "I know that I'm dealing with an idiot." Another question that annoyed him was "what is the difference between astronomy and astrology?" Despite this he made a point of responding to all letters delivered to his house, and sent a variety of standard replies to letters asking basic questions, as well as those from conspiracy theorists, proponents of hunting and 'cranks'. Despite his fame, his telephone number was always listed in the telephone directory and he was happy to show members of the public his observatory.

He compiled the Caldwell catalogue, (Note: Moore used the first of his two surnames, Caldwell, to name the list, since the initial of Moore is already used for the Messier catalogue.) of 109 star clusters, nebulae, and galaxies for observation by amateur astronomers. In 1982, asteroid 2602 Moore was named in his honour. In February 1986, he presented a special episode of The Sky at Night on the approach of Halley's Comet. However, he later said the BBC's better-funded Horizon team "made a complete hash of the programme." In January 1998, a tornado destroyed part of Moore's garden observatory; it was subsequently rebuilt. Moore campaigned unsuccessfully against the closure of the Royal Observatory, Greenwich in 1998. Among Moore's favourite episodes of The Sky at Night were those that dealt with eclipses, and he said, "there is nothing in nature to match the glory of a total eclipse of the Sun."

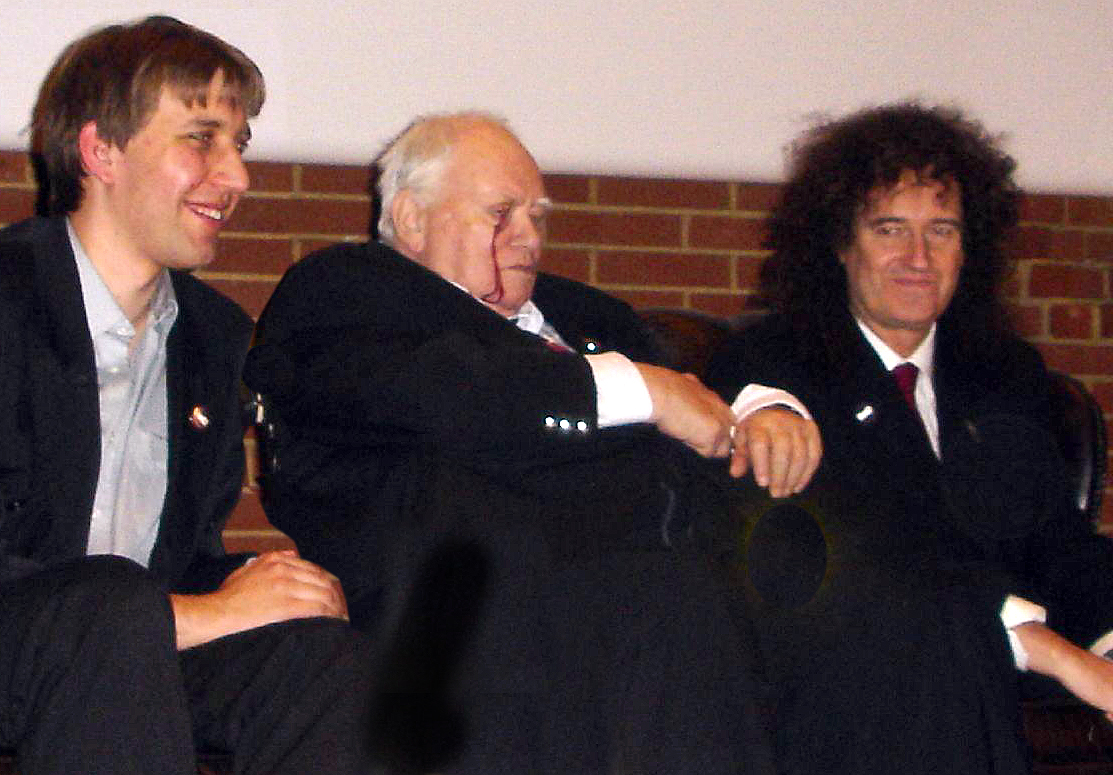
Moore with his co-presenter Chris Lintott and Brian May, astrophysicist and Queen guitarist, at AstroFest in 2007

Moore was a BBC presenter for the total eclipse in England in 1999, though the view he and his team had from Cornwall was obscured by cloud. Moore was the patron of the South Downs Planetarium and Science Centre, and he attended its official opening in 2001.

On 1 April 2007, a 50th anniversary semi-spoof edition of the programme was broadcast on BBC One, with Moore depicted as a Time Lord. It featured special guests, amateur astronomers Jon Culshaw (impersonating Moore presenting the first The Sky at Night) and Brian May. On 6 May 2007, a special edition of The Sky at Night was broadcast on BBC One to commemorate the programme's 50th anniversary, with a party in Moore's garden at Selsey, attended by amateur and professional astronomers. Moore celebrated the record-breaking 700th episode of The Sky at Night at his home in Sussex on 6 March 2011. He presented with the help of special guests Professor Brian Cox, Jon Culshaw and Lord Rees, the Astronomer Royal.

It was reported in January 2012 that because of arthritis and the effects of an old spinal injury, he was no longer able to operate a telescope. However, he was still able to present The Sky at Night from his home.

== Activism and political beliefs ==
Moore briefly supported the Liberal Party in the 1950s, though later condemned the Liberal Democrats, saying he believed they could alter their position radically and that they "would happily join up with the BNP or the Socialist Workers Party ... if [by doing so] they could win a few extra votes." In the 1970s, he was chairman of the anti-immigration United Country Party, a position he held until the party was absorbed by the New Britain Party in 1980. He campaigned for the politician Edmund Iremonger at the 1979 general election, as the two men agreed the French and Germans were not to be trusted. Iremonger and Moore gave up political campaigning after deciding they were Thatcherites. He also admired the Official Monster Raving Loony Party and was briefly their financial adviser. A Eurosceptic, he was a supporter and patron of the UK Independence Party, and campaigned on behalf of Douglas Denny, the UKIP candidate for the Chichester constituency in 2001.

Moore was known for his conservative political views. Proudly declaring himself to be English (rather than British) with "not the slightest wish to integrate with anybody", he stated his admiration for British politician Enoch Powell. Moore devoted an entire chapter ("The Weak Arm of the Law") of his autobiography to denouncing modern British society, particularly "motorist-hunting" policemen, sentencing policy, the Race Relations Act, Sex Discrimination Act and the "Thought Police/Politically Correct Brigade". He wrote that "homosexuals are mainly responsible for the spreading of AIDS (the Garden of Eden is home of Adam and Eve, not Adam and Steve)". In 2007, in an interview with Radio Times, he said the BBC was being "ruined by women", commenting that: "The trouble is that the BBC now is run by women and it shows: soap operas, cooking, quizzes, kitchen-sink plays. You wouldn't have had that in the golden days." In response, a BBC spokeswoman described Moore as being one of TV's best-loved figures and remarked that his "forthright" views were "what we all love about him". During his June 2002 appearance on Room 101 he banished female newsreaders into Room 101.

I may be accused of being a dinosaur, but I would remind you that dinosaurs ruled the Earth for a very long time.

— Moore responds to those who criticise his right-wing beliefs

He wrote in his autobiography that Liechtenstein – a semi-constitutional monarchy headed by a prince – had the best political system in the world. Moore was a critic of the Iraq War, and said "the world was a safer place when Ronald Reagan was in the White House".

Moore cited his opposition to fox hunting, blood sport and capital punishment to rebut claims that he had ultra-right-wing views. Though not a vegetarian, he held "a deep contempt for people who go out to kill merely to amuse themselves." He was an animal lover, supporting many animal welfare charities (particularly Cats Protection). He had a particular affinity for cats and stated that "a catless house is a soulless house".

Moore was opposed to astronomy being taught in schools. In an interview, he said:

You see, anyone who is interested in astronomy will gravitate to it, as I did. If you start teaching it as a school subject, it's going to be taught badly, like everything else these days, and enthusiasm is going to be killed.

== Other interests and popular culture ==
Because of his long-running television career and eccentric demeanour, Moore was widely recognised and became a popular public figure. In 1976 it was used to good effect for an April Fools' Day spoof on BBC Radio 2, when Moore announced a once-in-a-lifetime astronomical event that meant that if listeners could jump at that exact moment, 9.47 a.m. they would experience a temporary sensation of weightlessness. The BBC received many telephone calls from listeners alleging they experienced the sensation. He was a key figure in the establishment of the International Birdman event in Bognor Regis, which was initially held in Selsey.

Moore appeared in other television and radio shows, including the BBC Radio 4 panel show Just a Minute. From 1992 until 1998, he played the role of GamesMaster, a character who knew everything about video games, in the Channel 4 television series GamesMaster. GamesMaster would issue video game challenges and answered questions about cheats and tips. The show's host, Dominik Diamond, said that Moore did not understand anything he said on the show but recorded his contributions in single takes.

Moore was a keen amateur actor, appearing in local plays. He appeared in self-parodying roles, in several episodes of The Goodies and on the Morecambe and Wise show, and broadcast with Kenneth Horne only a few days before Horne's death. He had a minor role in the fourth radio series of The Hitchhiker's Guide to the Galaxy, and a lead role in the BBC Radio 1 sci-fi play, Independence Day UK in which amongst other things, Moore fills in as a navigator. Among other shows, he appeared in It's a Celebrity Knockout, Blankety Blank and Face the Music, and in the Q.E.D. episode "Round Britain Whizz".

Moore expressed appreciation for the science fiction television series Doctor Who and Star Trek, but stated that he had stopped watching when "they went PC - making women commanders, that kind of thing". Despite this he made a cameo appearance in the Doctor Who episode "The Eleventh Hour" in 2010, which was Matt Smith's debut as the Eleventh Doctor. In the 1960s, Moore had been approached by the Doctor Who story editor Gerry Davis to act as a scientific advisor on the series to help with the accuracy of stories, a position ultimately taken by Kit Pedler.

A keen amateur chess player, Moore carried a pocket set and was vice president of Sussex Junior Chess Association. In 2003, he presented Sussex Junior David Howell with the best young chess player award on Carlton Television's Britain's Brilliant Prodigies show. Moore had represented Sussex in his youth.

Moore was an enthusiastic amateur cricketer, playing for the Selsey Cricket Club well into his seventies. He played for the Lord's Taverners, a cricketing charity team, as a bowler with an unorthodox action. Though an accomplished leg spin bowler, he was a number 11 batsman and a poor fielder. The jacket notes to his book "Suns, Myths and Men" (1968) said his hobbies included "chess, which he plays with a peculiar leg-spin, and cricket." He played golf and won a Pro-Am competition in Southampton in 1975.

Until forced to give up because of arthritis, Moore was a keen pianist and accomplished xylophone player, having first played the instrument at the age of 13. He composed a substantial corpus of works, including two operettas. Moore had a ballet, Lyra's Dream, written to his music. He performed at a Royal Command Performance, and performed a duet with Evelyn Glennie.

In 1998, as a guest on Have I Got News for You, he accompanied the show's closing theme tune on the xylophone and as a pianist, he once accompanied Albert Einstein playing The Swan by Camille Saint-Saëns on the violin (no recording was made). In 1981 he performed a solo xylophone rendition of the Sex Pistols' "Anarchy in the U.K." in a Royal Variety Performance. He did not enjoy most popular music: when played ten modern rock songs by such artists as Hawkwind, Muse and Pink Floyd, in a 2009 interview with journalist Joel McIver, he explained, "To my ear, all these songs are universally awful."

Before encountering health problems, he was an extensive traveller and had visited all seven continents, including Antarctica; he said his favourite two countries were Iceland and Norway. On 7 March 2006 he was hospitalised and fitted with a pacemaker because of cardiac dysrhythmia.

Moore was a friend of the Queen guitarist and astrophysicist Brian May, who was an occasional guest on The Sky at Night. May bought Moore's Selsey home in 2008, leasing it back to him for a peppercorn rent the same day to provide financial security. May, Moore and Chris Lintott co-wrote a book Bang! The Complete History of the Universe. In February 2011, Moore completed (with Robin Rees and Iain Nicolson) his comprehensive Patrick Moore's Data Book of Astronomy for Cambridge University Press. In 1986, he was identified as the co-author of a book published in 1954 called Flying Saucer from Mars, attributed to Cedric Allingham, which was intended as a money-making venture and practical joke on UFO believers; Moore never admitted his involvement.

Moore believed himself to be the only person to have met the first aviator, Orville Wright, the first man in space, Yuri Gagarin, and the first man on the moon, Neil Armstrong.

In March 2015, BBC Radio 4 broadcast a 45-minute play based on the life of Moore, The Far Side of the Moore by Sean Grundy, starring Tom Hollander as Moore and Patricia Hodge as his mother.

Moore is portrayed by Daniel Beales in the Netflix series The Crown.

== Honours and appointments ==
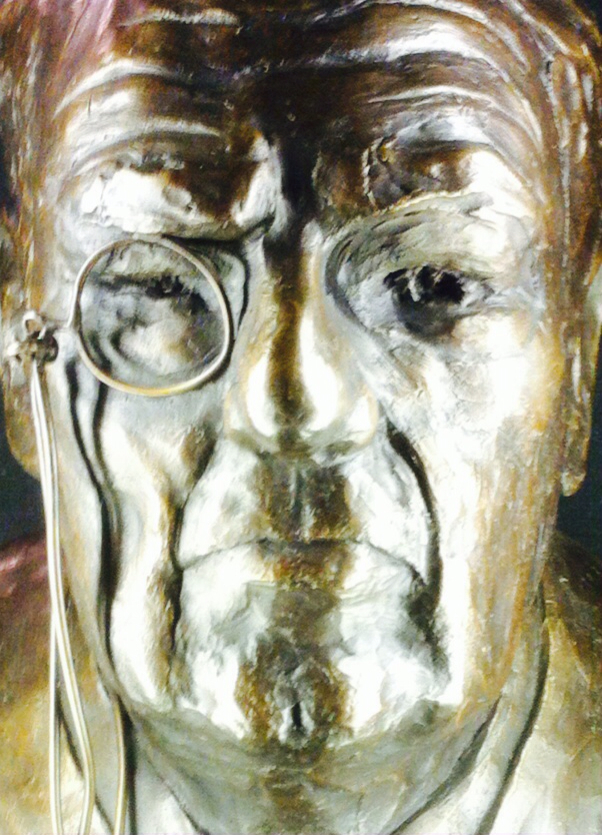
Bronze bust of Moore at the National Space Centre, Leicester

In 1945, Moore was elected a Fellow of the Royal Astronomical Society (FRAS), and in 1977 he was awarded the society's Jackson-Gwilt Medal. He was also a long-time Fellow of the British Interplanetary Society and a member of its Council; he was the founding editor of the Society's monthly magazine Spaceflight, first published in 1956. He made the Sir Patrick Moore Medal to recognise outstanding contributions to the Society. In 1968, he was appointed an Officer of the Order of the British Empire (OBE) and promoted to a Commander (CBE) in 1988. In 1999, he became the Honorary President of the East Sussex Astronomical Society, a position he held until his death. Moore was knighted for "services to the popularisation of science and to broadcasting" in the 2001 New Year Honours.

In 2001, he was appointed an Honorary Fellow of the Royal Society (HonFRS) since he had been the most effective and influential writer and speaker about astronomy in the UK and for his contribution to science in the United Kingdom. In June 2002, he was appointed as the Honorary Vice-president of the Society for the History of Astronomy. Also in 2002, Buzz Aldrin presented him with a British Academy of Film and Television Arts (BAFTA) award for services to television. He was patron of Torquay Boys' Grammar School in south Devon. Moore had a long association with the University of Leicester and its Department of Physics and Astronomy and was awarded an Honorary Doctor of Science (HonDSc) degree in 1996 and a Distinguished Honorary Fellowship in 2008, the highest award that the university can bestow.

== Personal life and death ==
World War II had a significant influence on Moore's life – he said his only romance ended when his fiancée Lorna, a nurse, was killed in London in 1943 by a bomb which struck her ambulance. Moore subsequently remarked that he never married because "there was no one else for me ... second best is no good for me ... I would have liked a wife and family, but it was not to be." In his biography of Moore, Martin Mobberley expressed doubts over this account, as it was not possible to identify Lorna, saying that Moore told varying stories about her. In his autobiography, he said that after sixty years, he still thought about her, and because of her death, "if I saw the entire German nation sinking into the sea, I could be relied upon to help push it down." In May 2012, Moore told the Radio Times magazine, "We must take care. There may be another war. The Germans will try again, given another chance." He also said, in the same interview, that "the only good Kraut is a dead Kraut".

Moore said he was "exceptionally close" to his mother Gertrude, a talented artist who shared his home at Selsey, West Sussex, which was decorated with her paintings of "bogeys" – little friendly aliens – that she produced and sent out annually as the Moores' Christmas cards. Moore wrote the foreword for his mother's 1974 book, Mrs Moore in Space.

On 9 December 2012, Moore died of sepsis and heart failure, at his home in Selsey, aged 89. On 9 December 2014, it was reported that the Science Museum, London had acquired a large collection of his objects and manuscripts and memorabilia, including The Sky at Night scripts, and about 70 of his observation books, over more than 60 years, and manuscripts for astronomy and fiction books, and a 12.5-inch reflecting telescope.

== Bibliography ==
Moore wrote many popular books. From 1962 to 2011, he also edited the long-running annual Yearbook of Astronomy and was editor for many other science books in that period. He also wrote science fiction novels for children and wrote humorous works under the pen-name R. T. Fishall. The list below is therefore not exhaustive.

- A Guide to the Moon, 1953, ISBN 978-0-393-06414-8
- Mission to Mars, 1955
- The Planet Venus, 1956
- The Domes of Mars, 1956
- The Voices of Mars, 1957
- Peril on Mars, 1958
- Raiders of Mars, 1959
- A Guide to the Planets, 1960, ISBN 0-393-06319-4
- Stars and Space, 1960
- A Guide to the Stars, 1960, Library of Congress Catalog Card No. 60-7584
- Caverns of the moon, 1964
- Oxford Children's Reference Library Book 2: Exploring the World, 1966
- The Amateur Astronomer's Glossary, 1966 (reprinted as The A-Z of Astronomy)
- Moon Flight Atlas, 1969
- Observer's Book of Astronomy, 1971, ISBN 0-7232-1524-3
- Challenge of the Stars, 1972, ISBN 0528830457
- Can You Speak Venusian?, 1972, ISBN 0-352-39776-4
- How Britain Won the Space Race, 1972 (with Desmond Leslie)
- The Southern Stars, 1972, ISBN 0-851-79535-8
- Mastermind (Book 1), (edited by Boswell Taylor), the sections on Astronomy, 1973, republished 1984, ISBN 0-907812-64-3
- Watchers of the Stars:The Scientific Revolution, 1974, ISBN 0-399-11374-6
- Next Fifty Years in Space, 1976, ISBN 0-86002-033-9
- Astronomy Quiz Book, 1978, ISBN 0-552-54132-X
- The Scott Saunders Space Adventure series (six juvenile science fiction novels), 1977–1980
- Bureaucrats: How to Annoy Them (humour) (writing as R.T. Fishall), 1982, ISBN 0-09-929370-6
- New Observer's Book of Astronomy, 1983, ISBN 0-7232-1646-0
- Armchair Astronomy, 1984, ISBN 0-85059-718-8
- Travellers in Space and Time, 1984, ISBN 0-385-19051-4
- Stargazing: Astronomy Without A Telescope, 1985, ISBN 0-906053-92-7
- Explorers of Space, 1986, ISBN 0-86134-092-2
- Astronomy for the Under Tens, 1986, ISBN 0-540-01103-7
- The Astronomy Encyclopaedia, 1987, ISBN 0-85533-604-8
- Astronomers' Stars, 1987, ISBN 0-393-02663-9
- Television Astronomer: Thirty Years of the "Sky at Night", 1987, ISBN 0-245-54531-X
- Exploring the Night Sky with Binoculars, 1988, ISBN 0-521-36866-9
- Space Travel for the Under Tens, 1988, ISBN 0-540-01179-7
- The Universe for the Under Tens, 1990, ISBN 0-540-01209-2
- Mission to the Planets, 1991, ISBN 0-304-34088-X
- New Guide to the Planets, 1993, ISBN 0-283-06145-6
- The Sun and the Moon (Starry Sky), 1996, ISBN 0-09-967911-6
- The Guinness Book of Astronomy, 1995, ISBN 0-85112-643-X
- The Stars (Starry Sky), 1996, ISBN 0-09-967881-0
- The Sun and the Moon (Starry Sky), 1996, ISBN 0-09-967911-6
- The Planets (Starry Sky), 1996, ISBN 0-09-967891-8
- Eyes on the Universe: Story of the Telescope, 1997, ISBN 3-540-76164-0
- Exploring the Earth and Moon, 1997, ISBN 1-85361-447-5
- Philip's Guide to Stars and Planets, 1997, ISBN 0-540-07235-4
- Brilliant Stars, 1997, ISBN 0-304-34972-0
- Patrick Moore on Mars, 1998, ISBN 0-304-35069-9
- Patrick Moore's Guide to the 1999 Total Eclipse , 1999, ISBN 0-7522-1814-X
- Countdown!, or, How nigh is the end?, 1999, ISBN 0-7181-2291-7
- Exploring the Night Sky with Binoculars, 2000, ISBN 9780521793902
- The Star of Bethlehem, 2001, ISBN 0-9537868-2-X
- 80 Not Out: The Autobiography, 2003, ISBN 978-0-7509-4014-6
- 2004 The Yearbook of Astronomy, 2003, ISBN 0-333-98941-4 (editor)
- Voyage to Mars, 2003, ISBN 0-9543836-0-5
- Our Universe: Facts, Figures and Fun, 2007, ISBN 1-904332-41-2
- Patrick Moore's Data Book of Astronomy, 2011, Cambridge University Press, ISBN 978-0-521-89935-2 and ISBN 978-1-107-67165-2

== See also ==
- Jack Horkheimer, host of the astronomy show Jack Horkheimer: Star Gazer (American counterpart)
