= Jovian =

Jovian is the adjectival form of Jupiter and may refer to:

- Jovian (emperor) (Flavius Iovianus Augustus), Roman emperor (363–364 AD)
- Jovians and Herculians, Roman imperial guard corps
- Jovian (lemur), a Coquerel's sifaka known for Zoboomafoo
- Jovian (fiction), a hypothetical or fictional native inhabitant of the planet Jupiter
- Jovian planet or giant planet, any large gaseous planet
- Jovians, a non-playable race in Eve Online

== See also ==
- Iovianus Pontanus (Giovanni Pontano), an Italian humanist poet
- Jovian Chronicles, a science-fiction game
- Jovian–Plutonian gravitational effect, an April Fools' Day hoax
- Jovian system, the system of Jupiter's moons
- Joviânia, a small town in Brazil
- Jupiter
- Jupiter (mythology)
- Jovial (disambiguation)
