= The Dream of Jacob =

1974 composition by Krzysztof Penderecki

- Orchestral music by Krzysztof Penderecki
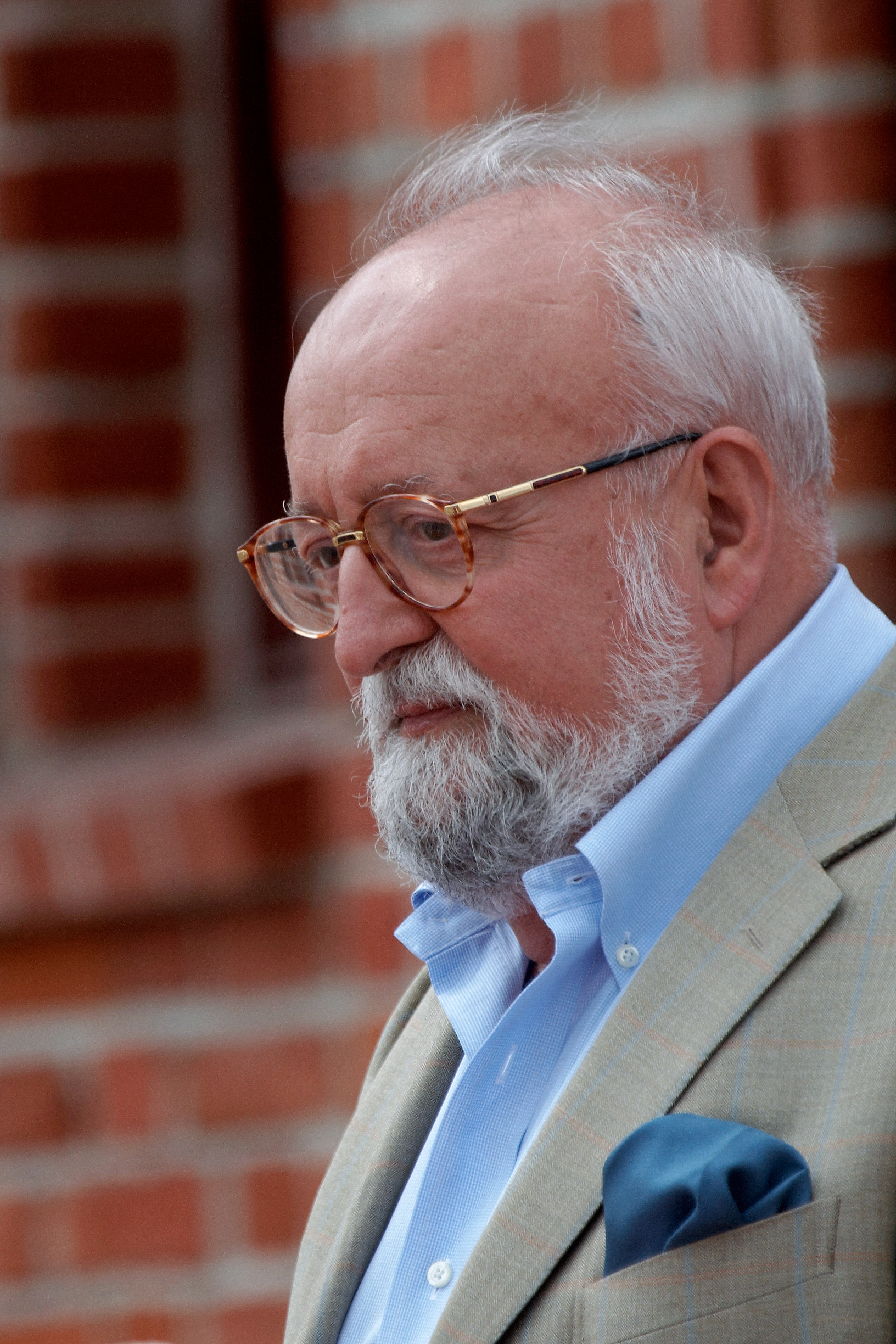
- Krzysztof Penderecki (the composer) in 2008
- Native name: Als Jakob erwachte
- Key: C
- Composed: 1974
- Dedication: Prince Rainier III
- Performed: 14 August 1974: Monte Carlo
- Publisher: PWM; Schott
- Duration: 7 to 8 min.
- Scoring: Orchestra

The Dream of Jacob, also referred to as The Awakening of Jacob (Polish: Przebudzenie Jakuba), is a composition by Polish composer Krzysztof Penderecki. It is scored for large orchestra and was finished in 1974.

== Conception and composition ==
The work's original German title, Als Jakob erwachte aus dem Schlaf, sah er, daß Gott dagewesen war. Er hat es aber nicht gemerkt ("When Jacob woke from his sleep, he saw that God had been there. He had not known it."), is extracted from the Bible and can be found in Genesis 28:16. The work was commissioned for the Silver Jubilee of Prince Rainier III of Monaco, to whom it is dedicated, and was first performed in Monte Carlo on 14 August 1974, by the Orchestre National de l'Opéra de Monte-Carlo under Stanislaw Skrowaczewski. It was eventually published by the Polish Music Publishing House and Schott Music.

== Analysis ==
The composition is scored for three flutes, three oboes, three B clarinets, three bassoons (all 12 woodwind players also double on ocarinas), five F horns, three B♭ trumpets, three trombones, one tuba, percussion and a large string section. The composition is loosely based on the Bible passage mentioned above, therefore trying to resemble being in the desert on a ladder to heaven, while the angels are ascending and descending.

The composition is in one movement and takes approximately seven minutes to perform. The score is notated in C. This composition is still one of the most performed in its repertoire and also the composition with which Penderecki introduced his neo-Romantic style, which he further developed in his following works, moving away from the style he had been using for the previous 15 years, which included the composition of his first symphony.

== Reception ==
The composition received initially mostly positive reviews from Polish and European critics. In the Polish literary magazine Kultura Paryska, the composition is praised for the elimination of "aggressive sound effects and terseness of form" in favor of a more refined style. German music critic Detlef Gojowy described the compositions as bearing strong influences of Richard Wagner and Dmitri Shostakovich. Andrew Porter, from The New Yorker, was also struck by the composer's exquisite use of the twelve ocarinas. However, Polish magazine Ruch muzyczny stated that The Dream of Jacob did not "fulfill the emotional expectations of the German audience”, but the logic and clarity used in its composition was heartily welcomed.

Bernard Holland, from The New York Times, highlighted that the Kraków Philharmonic's performances were reviewed favourably, but also noted that the people "would eventually tire of the riveting sounds in his works and begin to wonder why its musical ideas do not flow together more effectively". Penderecki was also criticised by the Jerusalem Symphony Orchestra for the difficulty of the notation, and June Schneider, from Music and Musicians, questioned if the composer "is able to provide anything other than superficial sound manipulations".

== In popular culture ==
The Dream of Jacob has been featured in other audiovisual material. The following is a list of the movies and video games in which the composition is featured:

- 1980 American film The Shining used prominent works by Penderecki, among them The Dream of Jacob.
- The 1985 BBC television series, The Day the Universe Changed, by James Burke, uses extracts in the first episode.
- The composition was also featured in 2006 American film Inland Empire.
- The soundtrack of Polish film Katyn, which contains The Dream of Jacob, consists exclusively of works by Penderecki.
- Some fragments can be heard in 2007 first-person shooter video game BioShock.
- The album The Dream Off Penderecki (2013), as well as the theatrical performance "The Dream Off Penderecki", are inspired by Penderecki's composition The Dream of Jacob, which was edited and published exclusively for celebration of his 80th birthday. The album was recorded by Theater of Creation (pl:Teatr Tworzenia) including Derek Jacobi, Daniel Olbrychski, Józef Skrzek, Jaroslaw Pijarowski and many others.
- Penderecki's 1974 rendition is sampled in The Caretaker's album We'll All Go Riding on a Rainbow, as well as other albums by The Caretaker, such as Everywhere at the End of Time, most notably in Stages 4 and 5.

== Notable recordings ==
Following are some of well-known recordings of this piece:

Orchestra	Conductor	Record company	Year of recording	Format
Polish Radio National Symphony Orchestra	Krzysztof Penderecki	EMI	1974	LP and CD
St. Olaf Orchestra	Krzysztof Penderecki	WCAL	1977	LP
Prague Radio Symphony Orchestra	Jacek Kasprzyk	Supraphon	1980	LP
Kraków Philharmonic Orchestra	Jacek Kasprzyk	Polskie Nagrania Muza	1980	LP
RAI National Symphony Orchestra	Krzysztof Penderecki	Fonit Cetra	1982	LP
MDR Leipzig Radio Symphony Orchestra	Herbert Kegel	VEB Deutsche Schallplatten Berlin/Berlin Classics	1984	CD
New England Conservatory Symphony Orchestra	Piero Bellugi	New England Conservatory Performances	1985	Cassette
Polish Radio National Symphony Orchestra	Antoni Wit	Polskie Nagrania Muza	1987	LP
Royal Stockholm Philharmonic Orchestra	Krzysztof Penderecki	Chandos	1995	CD
Warsaw Philharmonic Orchestra	Antoni Wit	Naxos	2008	CD
