= United Country Party (United Kingdom) =

British anti-immigration political party

- Chairperson: Patrick Moore
- Founder: Edmund Iremonger
- Founded: Late 1970s
- Dissolved: 1980
- Merged into: New Britain Party
- Ideology: Anti-immigration

The United Country Party was a minor political party in the United Kingdom during the late 1970s. The party was among those against immigration, inflation and the excesses of the Winter of Discontent, claiming to represent "people with common sense".

The party was formed by Edmund Iremonger, a member of the Conservative Party and The Freedom Association; noted amateur astronomer and television personality Patrick Moore was party chairman.

The party arose out of the perceived weakness of James Callaghan and right wing frustration at Edward Heath's leadership of the Conservative Party. "Though expressing admiration for Mrs Thatcher, the party was wary of the rest of the Conservative Party."

For the 1979 general election, they stood two of the 2575 candidates who received 1,033 votes in total. These were for seats in adjoining southern counties of Surrey and West Sussex, R. Peel for Farnham and Iremonger for Chichester, the seat in which Moore also lived. Both lost their deposit which was a small sum of £150 and its retention required 12.5% of the vote until the reforms of a statute brought into effect in 1985.

It was absorbed by the New Britain Party in 1980.
