= The Day the Universe Changed =

- Genre: Documentary
- Written by: James Burke
- Directed by: Richard Reisz
- Presented by: James Burke
- Theme music composer: Carl Davis
- Country of origin: United Kingdom
- Original language: English
- No. of seasons: 1
- No. of episodes: 10

Production
- Producer: Richard Reisz
- Running time: 55 minutes
- Production companies: BBC Productions in association with RKO Pictures, Canale 5, FR3 and YLE

Original release
- Network: BBC1
- Release: 19 March – 21 May 1985

Related
- Connections

The Day the Universe Changed: A Personal View by James Burke is a British documentary television series written and presented by science historian James Burke, originally broadcast on BBC1 from 19 March until 21 May 1985 by the BBC. The series' primary focus is on the effect of advances in science and technology on Western society in its philosophical aspects.

The title comes from the philosophical idea that the universe essentially only exists as one perceives it through what one knows; therefore, if one changes one's perception of the universe with new knowledge, one has essentially changed the universe itself. To illustrate this concept, James Burke tells the various stories of important scientific discoveries and technological advances and how they fundamentally altered how western civilization perceives the world. The series runs in roughly chronological order, from around the beginning of the Middle Ages to the present.

In the United States, the ten-week hour-long series was broadcast from 13 October to 15 December 1986, on PBS and was rebroadcast on The Learning Channel in 1993. In the PBS screening, there was an afterword segment after each episode where Professor Benjamin Dunlap of the University of South Carolina discussed details of the episode with Burke.

A 1985 companion book was published with the same title, also written by Burke, presenting the same general premise of the television series in expanded detail. Burke read from the book for an abridged audiocassette and compact disc set available from Macmillan Audio.

== Episodes ==
1. "The Way We Are: It Started with the Greeks"
2. "In the Light of the Above: Medieval Conflict: Faith & Reason": The development of academic discipline away from mysticism and towards structure, logic and reason.
3. "Point of View: Scientific Imagination in the Renaissance" The development of geometry, influencing everything from art to cartography and warfare.
4. "A Matter of Fact: Printing Transforms Knowledge": The invention of printing, and its impact on how knowledge was perceived, and language was standardised.
5. "Infinitely Reasonable: Science Revises the Heavens": The influence of mathematics on astronomy, and the impact on religious belief.
6. "Credit Where It's Due: The Factory & Marketplace Revolution": The impact of commerce on work, personal identity and rights.
7. "What the Doctor Ordered: Social Impacts of New Medical Knowledge": The development of public health and the change in the status of medicine and physicians.
8. "Fit to Rule: Darwin's Revolution": The social effects of systematization in science, from Linnaeus to Darwin.
9. "Making Waves: The New Physics: Newton Revised": Studies of the properties of magnetism, electricity, and light have led scientists to the realization that Newtonian physics is inadequate to explain all that they observe.
10. "Worlds Without End: Changing Knowledge, Changing Reality"

== Home video ==
Licensed by the BBC, The Day the Universe Changed was released on DVD in January 2009 by Documentary-Video. The five-disc set is closed captioned for the hearing impaired and approximately 550 minutes in length.

== Reception ==
Alfred Unger of The Christian Science Monitor (14 October 1986) said, "The Day the Universe Changed is studded with flashes of insight amid its potpourri of intellectual revelations. Burke believes that it will encourage viewers to examine what they know, digest what he has to tell them, and come up with, possibly, a new way of looking at things."

John Corry of The New York Times called it "television on a grand scale. Mr. Burke is interested in ideas, and they bubble and perk throughout. Sometimes we'll get lost, but most likely, we'll stay interested. This is provocative stuff."

Diana Simmonds of The Sydney Morning Herald (6 August 1988) said, "James Burke could have the answer. Maddeningly, he has the answer to most things and has had for years. This year he's being dazzling in The Day The Universe Changed (SBS). This series, in which he verbally dances through the earth-shattering events in history is, quite simply, exciting. Like an intravenous slug of ice-cold Akvavit, he provokes shivers of shock and pleasure. His mix of cleverness, egotism, fun, imagination and accessibility is similar to the television styles of Robert Hughes or J.K.Galbraith, except that Burke is also naughty – like a mischievous elf."

== Music ==
Whilst Carl Davis composed the main title theme and some incidental music, the series itself made extensive use of brief extracts from classical music, including:

- Episode 1: Krzysztof Penderecki: The Dream of Jacob; William Walton: Symphony No. 1; Ottorino Respighi: "Laura soave" from Antiche arie e danze, Suite 2; Michael Praetorius: Terpsichore; Olivier Messiaen: "Chant d'amour 1" from Turangalîla-Symphonie; Richard Wagner: 'Fate' leitmotif from Der Ring des Nibelungen; Marcel Landowski: Concerto for ondes martenot and orchestra; Vangelis: Invisible Connections; Dmitri Shostakovich: Symphony No. 15; Ralph Vaughan Williams: Sinfonia antartica, Prokofiev : Alexander Nevsky Cantata, Op. 78 - Russia Beneath The Yoke Of The Mongols.
- Episode 2: Messiaen: "Introduction" from Turangalîla-Symphonie; Respighi: "I pini della Via Appia" from Pines of Rome; Walton: Symphony No. 1; Michael Tippett: Symphony No. 2; Benjamin Britten: Death in Venice suite.
- Episode 3: Respighi: Antiche arie e danze — "Laura soave" from Suite 2 and "Balletto detto Il Conte Orlando" from Suite 1; Tomás Luis de Victoria: Motets; Praetorius: Terpsichore
- Episode 4: Carl Orff: "Tempus est iocundum" and "Tanz" from Carmina Burana; Giuseppe Verdi: "Dies irae" from Messa da Requiem; Camille Saint-Saëns: Le Rouet d'Omphale.
- Episode 5: Wolfgang Amadeus Mozart: Symphony No. 24 in B flat major; Annibale Padovano: Aria della Battaglia à 8; Vincenzo Galilei: Contrapunto secondo; David Bedford: "The Sirens" from The Odyssey; Giovanni Pierluigi da Palestrina: Credo from Missa Papae Marcelli; Henry Purcell: Trumpet Sonata in D major.
- Episode 6: Vaughan Williams: A Pastoral Symphony; Thomas Arne: Rule, Britannia!; George Lloyd: Symphony No. 4; Hubert Parry: Jerusalem.
- Episode 7: Igor Stravinsky: Le Sacre du Printemps; Christoph Willibald Gluck: Overture from Orfeo ed Euridice; Claude Joseph Rouget de Lisle: La Marseillaise; Johann Sebastian Bach: O Lamm Gottes, Unschuldig, BWV565; Shostakovich: Symphony No. 4; Saint-Säens: Symphony No. 3; Aaron Copland: Appalachian Spring; Franz Liszt: Réminiscences De Simone Boccanegra.
- Episode 8: Franz von Suppe: Light Cavalry Overture; Georg Friedrich Handel: Oboe sonata in C minor (HWV 366); Ludwig van Beethoven: Symphony No. 8; Antonín Dvořák: Rondo in G minor; Robert Busby: Hue and Cry; Wagner: Tannhäuser (opera); Roberto Pregardio: Ballata Per Un Pistolero; Carl Nielsen: Symphony No. 5; Arthur Honegger: Pacific 231; Pierre De Geyter: The Internationale.
- Episode 9: Mozart: String Quartet No. 3 in G; Bernhard Crusell: Grand Concerto No. 2 in F minor; Arthur Sullivan: "Imperial March" from Utopia Limited; Anton Karas: Harry Lime Theme; Sam Fonteyn: Comedy Capers.
