= Connections (1995 video game) =

1995 educational adventure video game

- Cover art for the game.
- Developers: Discovery Channel Multimedia; Some Interactive
- Publishers: Discovery Channel Multimedia, The Learning Channel, Some Interactive
- Platforms: Windows 3.x, Windows, Macintosh
- Release: 1995
- Genre: Adventure game
- Mode: Single-player

Connections is a 1995 educational adventure video game.

== Gameplay ==
Players progress through a series of graphic screens, and FMV video to find a series of connections. Items can be manipulated using hotspots. Players can toggle a hints system, adjust volume, save the game, and choose their gender.

== Plot ==
Based on the show Connections on The Learning Channel, the game revolves around a plot of the player aiming to fix a computer program, by finding a series of connections that glue the world together.

== Critical reception ==
Reception

Review scores
Publication	Score
AllGame	4/5
Computer Gaming World	5/5
Macworld	4/5, 7.2/10
Entertainment Weekly	C
MacUser	3/5
Quandary	3.5/5

Lisa Karen Savignano of AllGame wrote that the game was "exceptional" but that it had the potential to leave players endlessly frustrated. WorldVillage's Craig Majaski thought the game would appeal to players who had enjoyed Myst or Return to Zork. Meanwhile, Macworld's George and Ben Beekman thought the game was well below the industry standard for the genre. Entertainment Weekly thought the game was a missed opportunity; instead of being interesting and unique it was merely "Myst with a twist".
