= South Downs Planetarium and Science Centre =

Educational facility in Chichester, West Sussex

Coordinates: 50.827°N 0.778°W

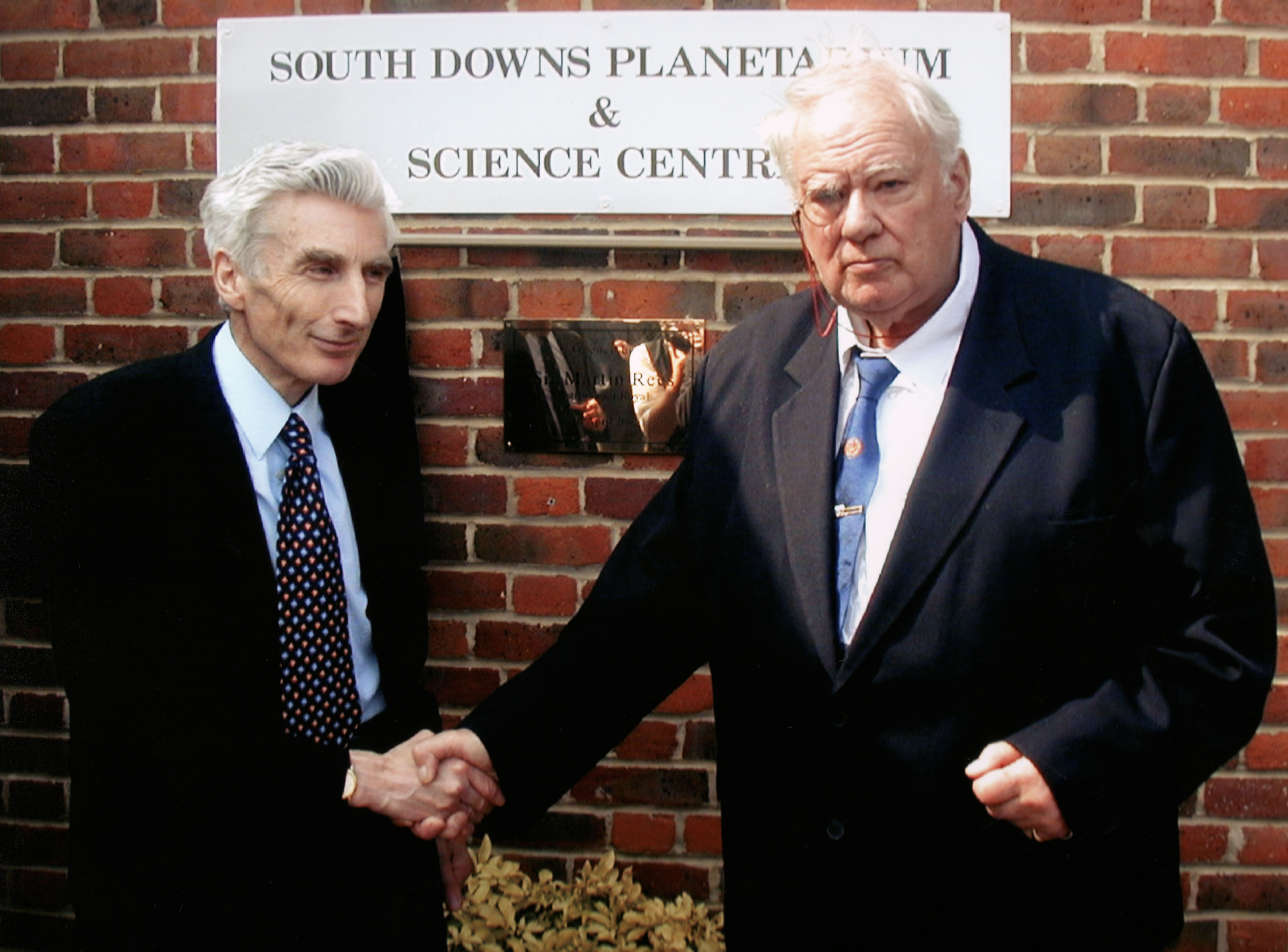
Sir Patrick Moore was joined by the Astronomer Royal, Sir Martin Rees, for the official opening of the South Downs Planetarium on 5 April 2002.

The South Downs Planetarium and Science Centre is an educational facility in Chichester, West Sussex, run by a team of volunteers and astronomy enthusiasts and inaugurated in 2002. A registered educational charity, the Planetarium operates throughout the year, is available for private bookings, and can arrange special shows for schools, private groups, clubs and societies in the day, evening or at weekends.

In 2007, Sir Patrick Moore stated in an interview with the BBC that the planetarium was self-financing.

== History ==
The Planetarium project was started in 1992 by members of the South Downs Astronomical Society who wanted to establish an educational centre to promote astronomy, space and Earth sciences on the south coast of England. In 1994 West Sussex County Council made available a plot of land and a barn which after subsequent rebuilding work formed the main Planetarium building. The establishment is in the south of Chichester, now being called the Sir Patrick Moore Building, accessed from Kingsham Road, Chichester, West Sussex.

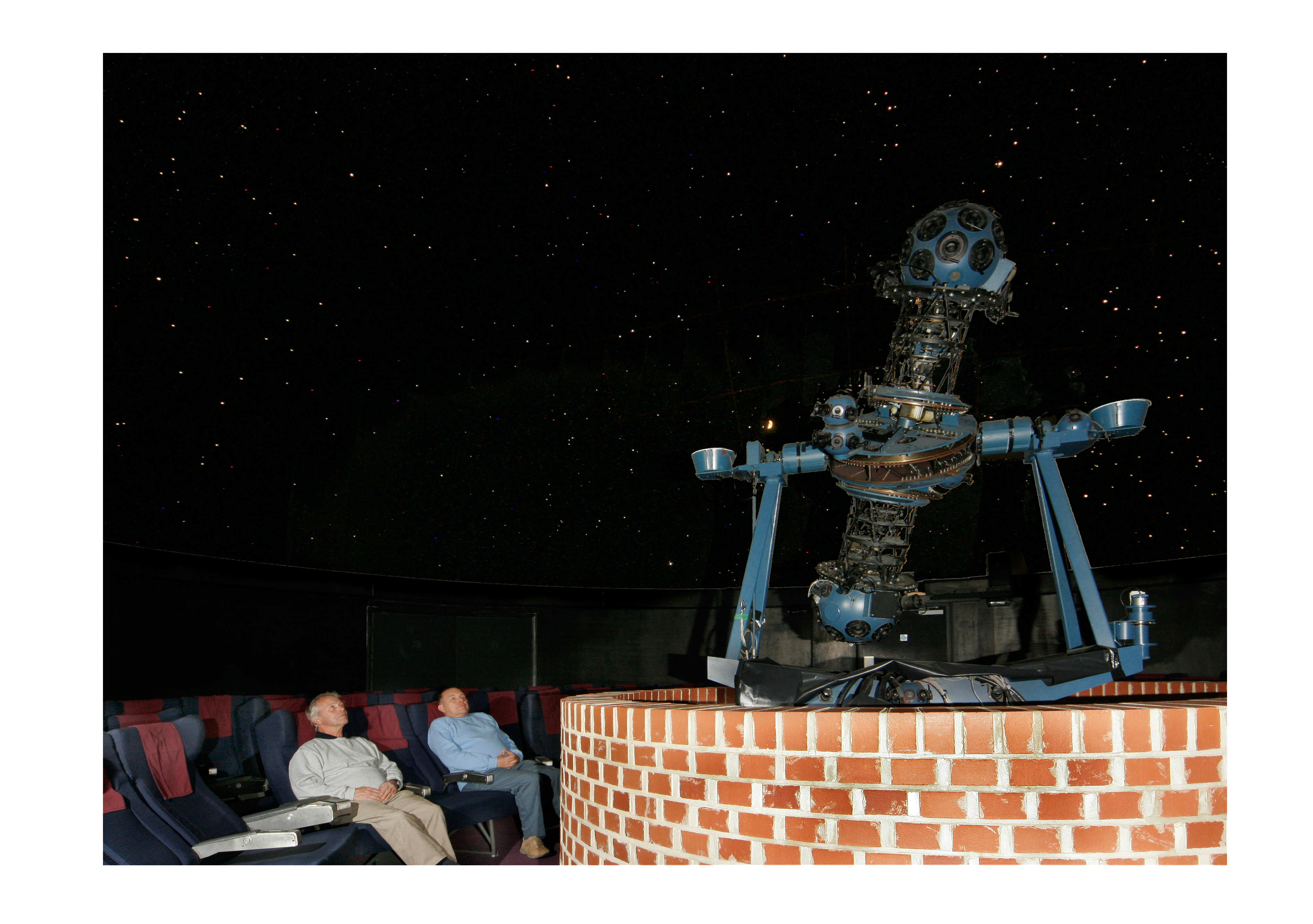
The Viewlex-Minolta IIb star projector in the main auditorium at the South Downs Planetarium.

At about the same time, a Viewlex-Minolta S-IIb star projector (dating from 1977) was retired by the Armagh Planetarium and acquired for the South Downs Planetarium. The projector had not been used for some years but astronomer Dr John Mason (a former president of the British Astronomical Association) was able to put it back into working order.

After a seven-year fundraising campaign, led by the project's Patron Sir Patrick Moore, the construction and fitting out of the star theatre, adjoining foyer and associated facilities were completed and the Planetarium opened in June 2001 and was inaugurated by Moore and the Astronomer Royal, Sir Martin Rees in April 2002. Moore (in 2011) attributed the success of the project to four prime-movers: John Mason, John Green, Peter Fray and Roger Prout.

To complement the Science Centre the British and Irish Meteorite Society donated a substantial meteorite collection in 2005.

In 2011 the Planetarium featured in an episode of the BBC series The Sky at Night.

== Facilities ==
The Planetarium has a 100-seater auditorium, displays, shop, library and computer room. The centrepiece of the star theatre is the projector which projects nearly 4500 stars and other celestial objects on to the dome. There is free car parking adjacent to the Planetarium building, easy access for the disabled, and it is only a short (856mt) walk from Chichester rail and bus stations.

The Planetarium puts on new public shows every month, usually on Friday evenings and Sunday afternoons, but also at other times during school holidays. In addition to presentations in the star theatre, there is a learning centre featuring full HD projection, a range of wall-mounted displays and desktop computers running a range of astronomically-related programs.
