= British television Apollo 11 coverage =

- James Burke, one of the main presenters of the BBC's coverage of the Apollo 11 mission, reviews its launch earlier in the day on 16 July 1969
- Presented by: James Burke; Patrick Moore; Cliff Michelmore; David Frost; Alastair Burnet
- Country of origin: United Kingdom

Production
- Running time: 8 days

Original release
- Network: BBC1, BBC2, ITV
- Release: 16 July – 24 July 1969

British television coverage of the Apollo 11 mission, the first crewed landing on the Moon, lasted from 16 to 24 July 1969. Three UK television channels, BBC1, BBC2 and ITV, provided extensive coverage of the mission. Most of the footage covering the event was wiped or lost, however some fragments of certain broadcasts have been found.

== BBC coverage ==
BBC Apollo 11 studio, with James Burke (standing), Cliff Michelmore and Patrick Moore (seated), June 1969

BBC television coverage of man's first landing on the Moon consisted of 27 hours of coverage over a ten-day period. The programmes titled Apollo 11 were broadcast from Lime Grove Studios in London. The BBC2 sections were broadcast in colour and the BBC1 sections in black and white (full-colour television in the United Kingdom being a few months away). Its main presenter was Cliff Michelmore, with James Burke and Patrick Moore concentrating on scientific and technical explanations and analysis. In America, Michael Charlton reported live from Cape Kennedy and Mission control in Houston. There had been a big build-up to the coverage. The Radio Times had a cover with a rocket shooting off and the caption "Target Moon".

The London studio set of Apollo 11 consisted of "a long, angled desk, large models of the Moon and the Earth, and a large picture of a rocket against a dark, 'cosmic'-type background. On the front of the desk was a digital clock which counted down the time to lift-off etc. Film animations and models of various parts of the spacecraft helped explain certain stages of the journey".

Every day of the mission had broadcasts from the space studio. These would vary between long programmes at important points in the mission, such as launching and undocking, shorter progress reports, and special Moon-centric contributions to news bulletins, children's television and Twenty-Four Hours, a current affairs show. Programmes in between Apollo 11 reports included So what if it's just Green Cheese? an Omnibus anthology broadcast on the night of the Moon landing. Rock group Pink Floyd provided an exclusive instrumental piece called "Moonhead": there is an audio recording of the track, which was only officially released in 2016 as part of the box set The Early Years 1965–1972. Featured alongside them were distinguished actors including Ian McKellen, Judi Dench, Michael Hordern and Roy Dotrice, all reading quotes and poetry about the moon. The show also featured Dudley Moore with The Dudley Moore Trio and jazz singer Marion Montgomery. David Bowie's song "Space Oddity" — which had been released just a few weeks prior to the landing — was also included in the coverage.

Michael Charlton reports for the BBC from Houston Mission Control

The actual night of the Moon landing on Sunday/Monday, 20/21 July was also historic for British TV, as it was the first all-night broadcast on British television, with both BBC1 and ITV remaining on air for 11 hours from 11.30 p.m. on 20 July to 10.30 a.m. the following morning. The Lunar Module landed on the Moon at 21:17:39 BST (16:17:39 EDT) on Sunday, 20 July 1969. Neil Armstrong stepped onto the surface of the Moon at 3:56 a.m., 21 July, British time. His comments were interspersed with commentary from James Burke, often to fill in the silences.

John Godson, who was directing the news that night, remembered,

When Neil Armstrong stepped onto the Moon's surface, the whole BBC control room, with the canteen ladies and security guards standing beside the vision control desk, exploded into cheering and clapping. To us it had been a similar type of relief as it must have been to Armstrong, his crew and Ground Control. Up to now, nothing had gone wrong. I vividly recall we had Armstrong's "One small step" spiel with very little distortion, considering he was in full lunar gear. I mean, it was easily comprehensible though, shall we say, slightly garbled. It was quite difficult to make any visual sense out of the first pictures from the lunar surface, as I recollect. But under those circumstances we would have had James Burke describe, voice-over, what we were trying to assimilate with our eyes. I was there to direct the situation – to decide when voice-over explanations were required, to be ready to take actions if the picture circuits failed. In fact, it resulted in quite a calm overnight operation with, if I remember correctly, not a single major panic situation other than numerous sound comprehension problems.

The first images from the Moon were upside down, so engineers on Earth operated an electronic switch on receiving the signal to correct the picture. All transmissions from the Moon were in black and white. When Buzz Aldrin became the second man on the Moon nineteen minutes later, the picture quality had improved – after the moonrise in Australia the signal had moved from the smaller Goldstone in California to the stronger signal received on the main on-axis receiver of the Parkes radio-telescope in Australia, and then relayed via the Honeysuckle Creek station to Sydney for subsequent distribution uplink. The BBC later earned a Queen's Award For Industry for the electronic standards converter, which helped translate the pictures from California, via the Goonhilly Satellite Earth Station in Cornwall to the BBC in London.

For several hours after the live event, pictures of the moonwalk were reshown as edited highlights.

Patrick Moore considered it the most exciting event he ever reported on. He said, "[b]ridging the gap between two worlds was an awesome achievement." James Burke has said in retrospect that it was "[t]he greatest media event of all time". On its tenth anniversary in 1979, he looked back on the whole Apollo programme in two BBC documentaries, The Men Who Walked on the Moon (BBC1) and The Other Side of the Moon (BBC2, later the same night). Stuart Harris, the producer of those documentaries, has written a memoir of BBC TV's Apollo 11 coverage, recalling that the event became a point of contention between the Science & Features Department, which had covered previous space events, including the Apollo 8 mission, and the Current Affairs Department, which had more appropriate resources for staging large events.

== ITV coverage ==
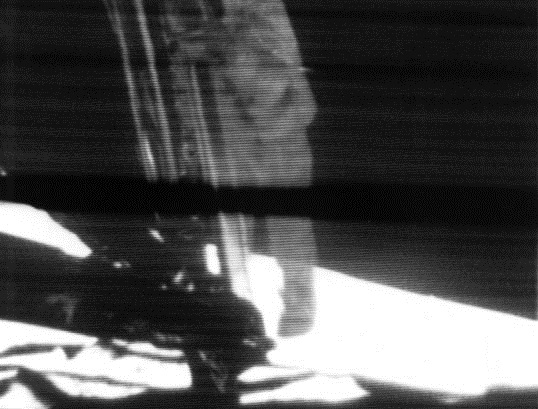
A mounted slowscan TV camera shows Neil Armstrong as he climbs down the ladder of the Lunar Module Eagle to the surface. Paul Haney at ITN described it as "the greatest thing to happen since fish crawled up on the beach and survived."

ITN provided the bulk of the coverage of the Apollo 11 mission for the United Kingdom's then-sole commercial television station. The main front man for the bulletins was Alastair Burnet, assisted by science correspondent Peter Fairley and former employee of NASA Paul Haney.

On the night of the moonwalk, ITV chose a much lighter tone in covering the event than the BBC. With 16 hours of coverage, in between news bulletins was David Frost's Moon Party, a discussion and entertainment show made by London Weekend Television. It featured showbiz personalities such as Peter Cook, Cilla Black, Cliff Richard, Lulu, Mary Hopkin, Sammy Davis Jr., Hattie Jacques and Eric Sykes. It was said to feature "relevant facts about the moon landing" with "a wealth of outside comment", that according to one commentator "broke up the mood of awesome solemnity that tends to afflict those occasions." The show continued until 3 am, and singer Engelbert Humperdinck, who also featured, was said to have collapsed from exhaustion due to its epic length. The show, transmitted from London Weekend's Wembley Studios, also featured more serious guests, such as Desmond Morris and Dame Sybil Thorndike. Author Ray Bradbury objected to what he saw as the frivolous tone of the show, and walked out before he could be interviewed.

Around midnight, a serious discussion on the ethics of the Moon landing was held, with historian A.J.P. Taylor and entertainer Sammy Davis Jr. "forming a somewhat bizarre alliance in attacking manned space flights." The show continued for longer than expected as the film Down to Earth was cancelled when NASA had brought forward their schedule by several hours, the moonwalk originally planned to occur at 7 am British time.

There were also reactions from the public at Trafalgar Square and from British Prime Minister Harold Wilson, and Peter Sissons interviewing experts including Sir Bernard Lovell at Jodrell Bank.

For the coverage of the Moon landing itself, ITV used computer generated captions such as "Armstrong taking manual control" and "Touchdown, The Eagle has landed". The captions were made by listening to the Houston-Lunar Module talkback, then entering in computer codes, which translated the Eagle's speed and altitude into on-screen information. Paul Haney described the moonwalk on the coverage as "the greatest thing to happen since fish crawled up on the beach and survived." He remarked the landing was only four miles off the point projected "which is pretty good for Government work". Reminiscing in 1999, ITN producer David Nicholson remembered it as "perhaps the most exciting twelve minutes I've ever seen on television. It was a hugely thrilling moment. I remember in the ITN control room there was a gasp from the production staff."

In his diary on 21 July 1969, comedian Michael Palin wrote "the extraordinary thing about the evening was that, until 3:56 am, when Armstrong clambered out of the spaceship and activated the keyhole camera, we had seen no space pictures at all, and yet ITV had somehow contrived to fill ten hours with a programme devoted to the landing." Comparing the BBC and ITV's takes on the broadcast, Stanley Reynolds in The Guardian commented: "Perhaps on no other programme have we seen quite so clearly the basic differences between the two television services."

Michael Billington reviewing in The Times was much more favourable to the ITV coverage. He said they had "seized the initiative" from the BBC. "In the past it has always been the BBC that has been ready to abandon its schedules to suit historic public events: yesterday, however, the traditional roles were reversed and it was the BBC that persevered with Dr. Finlay's Casebook and The Black and White Minstrel Show while Independent Television showed itself far more flexible and enterprising." He praised Frost for the way he "chaired the proceedings with his usual unflappable professionalism" and Burnett for "combining straight news with personal comment", though he said "the combination of news and variety is more debatable. There is certainly something a bit strange about going straight from a discussion about the orbit of Luna 15 to hearing Cilla Black singing her latest recording. On balance, I think this type of juxtaposition is justified, if only because some point of rest is needed in a programme of this length. The danger is that the viewer will be so saturated with information that his responses will be blunted when it comes to the moments of real excitement: pop music, however, provides the necessary let-up and fulfills [sic?] much the same function as comic relief in a five-act drama.

== Extant recordings ==
James Burke, in one of the few fragments remaining from the BBC's Apollo 11 coverage, demonstrates the Lunar EVA suit, in a specially filmed item, later to be inserted into the live broadcasts

The only known video fragment of Patrick Moore and James Burke presenting Apollo 11 together. It lasts 20 seconds and comes from an amateur homemade recording.

The footage of the BBC and ITV coverage became victim to the broadcasting policy of the era of either eventually erasing videotapes or simply not keeping them. It is unclear what happened to the original tapes. This led to rumours that they were taped over almost immediately with horse racing, that the coverage was barely taped at all, or that the tapes fell to bits during digital remastering. All these rumours have since been discounted.

BBC footage known to exist is a mix of fragments kept in the archive and amateur recordings made at the time.

- Two minute of footage showing Michael Charlton reporting the Eagle's successful moon landing in Houston.
- One minute of footage showing James Burke reviewing the Apollo 11 launch on 16 July 1969, on the programme Twenty-Four Hours.
- Various filmed inserts presented by James Burke, featuring him inside the Apollo Command Module, demonstrating Apollo Saturn emergency precautions, demonstrating the Lunar EVA suit and explaining weightlessness training.
- Some BBC News bulletins by Reg Turnill (not part of the live coverage).
- In autumn 2000, an amateur video recording was found of the event. It was found to be unplayable, but there is hope one day that some visual material may be salvageable.
- In 2003, a few telerecorded clips were discovered.
- A 20-second video fragment of Patrick Moore and James Burke presenting in the BBC studio on 20 July 1969, recovered from an amateur homemade recording.
- 8 mm home movie footage shot of a TV screen, showing some captions superimposed over pictures from Mission Control (although this has not been positively identified as BBC footage).

All that are known to exist from the ITV archives are two taped interviews by Peter Sissons at Jodrell Bank. Footage from Houston while the craft descended onto the Moon, showing on-screen data, also exists.

=== BBC4 reconstruction ===
The entire evening of the BBC's coverage was reconstructed on the BBC Four programme Apollo 11, A Night To Remember on 28 February 2006, in which "satellite pictures have been married up with amateur audio recordings, and linked with rarely-seen reports, background films, a couple of rediscovered studio clips, and some new explanatory pieces by Sir Patrick Moore, one of the presenters in 1969."

=== Soundtrack CD release ===
On 20 September 1994, a CD was released by Pearl entitled Apollo 11 Moon Landing: The BBC Television Broadcasts 16–24 July 1969. It contains extracts from the BBC television coverage of the first Moon landing, with additional retrospective views by Arthur C. Clarke and Patrick Moore. Lasting 73 minutes, it is based on some four hours of amateur off-air audio recordings by Stephen Sykes. Other off-air recordings are also known to exist.

==== Track listing ====
1. "Apollo + 25" – Arthur C. Clarke
2. "Speech By President John F. Kennedy (May 1961)"
3. "A Million People Have Made Their Way Down to the Cape"
4. "30 Billion Dollars for the Apollo Programme"
5. "This Is Apollo Saturn Launch Control"
6. "And All Eyes Looking Upwards"
7. "3 Minutes 45 Seconds And Counting"
8. "600 Million People This Afternoon Watched the Apollo 11"
9. "We're Now in the Approach Phase"
10. "Hatch Reported Coming Open"
11. "Armstrong About to Release TV Camera"
12. "About to Pick Up the "Contingency Sample" of Moon Rock"
13. "Making Sure Not to Lock It on the Way Out"
14. "Neil Is Now Unveiling the Plaque"
15. "Armstrong and Aldrin Talk to President Richard Nixon"
16. "Houston Communicates with Michael Collins"
17. "Armstrong and Aldrin Talk from Surface"
18. "With 3 Minutes Dead Go to the Lift Off"
19. "Lift Off"
20. "One Minute to Orbit Insertion"
21. "It's Down Below 23,000 Feet Now"
22. "Command Module Is Stable 2"
23. "Recovery 1 Is on Station"
24. "On Board USS Hornet"
25. "Final Thoughts" – Patrick Moore

== See also ==
- Apollo 11 in popular culture
