= Jovial =

Jovial may refer to:

- Brice Jovial (born 1984), French football striker
- JOVIAL, a programming language
- Hamster Jovial, a French comic book series
- Jovial Merryment, a character from Horse Race Tests
- The archaic adjectival form of:
  - Jupiter (mythology)
  - Jupiter, the planet

== See also ==
- Jovian (disambiguation)
- Joy, a positive emotion
