= New Britain Party =

British right-wing political party

New Britain
- President: George Brooker
- Chairman: Dennis Delderfield
- Vice-president: John Haynes
- Founded: 1976
- Dissolved: 2008
- Headquarters: 10 College East, Gunthorpe Street, London E1 7RL
- Ideology: British nationalism; National conservatism; Anti-Communism
- Political position: Right-wing

New Britain was a minor British right-wing political party founded by Dennis Delderfield in 1976. The party was de-registered in November 2008.

== Founding ==
It was led from its creation by Dennis Delderfield, a former Common Councilman of the City of London Corporation and editor of the City of London & Dockland Times. In 1980, the party absorbed the anti-immigration United Country Party, which had been chaired by TV astronomer Patrick Moore. Around this time it also absorbed a small anti-devolution group called the Keep Britain United Party. This party had contested a single seat (Carmarthen) in the 1979 general election.

== Positions ==
New Britain was described as an "avowedly racist party" by The Observer. It campaigned for the return of capital punishment, and was supported by the Christian Affirmation Campaign, a right-wing traditionalist movement opposed to what it saw as the World Council of Churches' support for Communist regimes in Africa. Delderfield signed a letter in 2000 that argued that "suburb after suburb and town after town across the land have been taken over by Asians, Africans and Afro-Caribbeans.... In the not too distant future they will have direct control in many areas."

== Electoral history ==
The party became active participants in by-elections, contesting those held in City of London and Westminster, Beaconsfield, Penrith and the Border and Bermondsey, as well as putting up two candidates in the general elections of 1979 and 1983. Its best performance was at the Bournemouth East by-election of November 1977, but the party's candidate in the Ilford North by-election of March 1978 was revealed to be a convicted child abuser after nominations had closed, and his endorsement was withdrawn.

In the 1994 European Parliament election, the last to be held under first-past-the-post, it achieved moderate success, saving its deposit in one seat and nearly doing so in another.

In the 2010 general election, former chairman Dennis Delderfield stood as an independent candidate in the Cities of London and Westminster Parliamentary constituency, from the contact address listed on the New Britain website.

== Membership ==
Some former members later joined the UK Independence Party, including Mike Nattrass, later a Member of the European Parliament for UKIP, who stood as New Britain candidate in the Dudley West by-election of 1994, gaining 146 votes. His fellow UKIP MEP Jeffrey Titford was also a briefly a member after the Referendum Party folded. Another UKIP candidate, Brian Smalley, joined in 1994 and was a member of the national committee.
