= Scott Saunders Space Adventure =

Series of SF novels by Patrick Moore

The Scott Saunders Space Adventure series are a series of young adult science-fiction novels written by Sir Patrick Moore (1923–2012), English amateur astronomer, TV and radio presenter, and science writer.

As the book series' title indicates, the books chronicle the adventures and trials of young British astronaut Scott Saunders. The series consist of six books published from 1977 to 1980.

== Titles ==
- Spy in Space (August 1977)
- Planet of Fear (August 1977)
- The Moon Raiders (July 1978)
- Killer Comet (September 1978)
- The Terror Star (May 1979)
- Secret of the Black Hole (November 1980)
