= Jovian–Plutonian gravitational effect =

Astronomical hoax

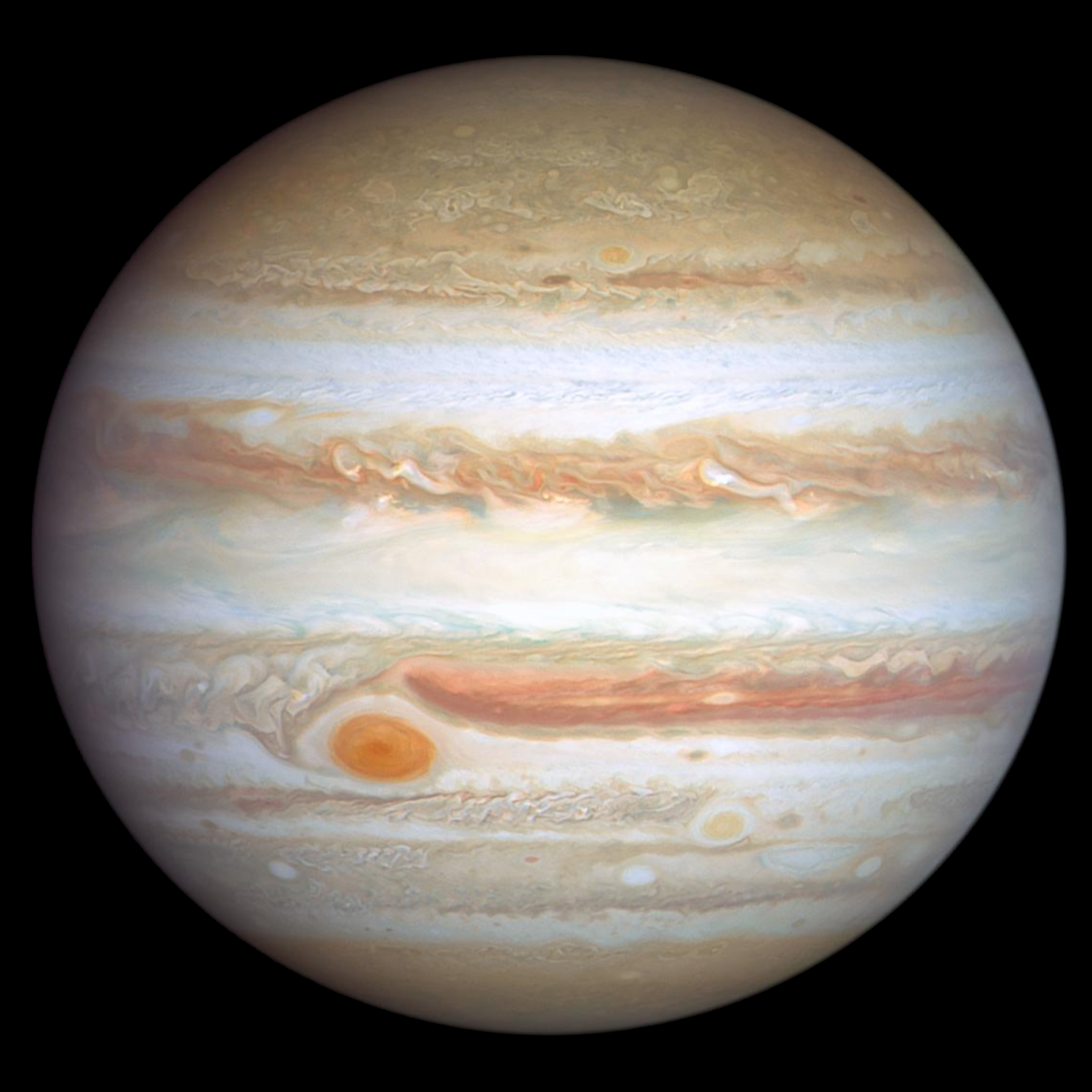
Jupiter, which has more than two and a half times the mass of all the other planets of the Solar System put together.

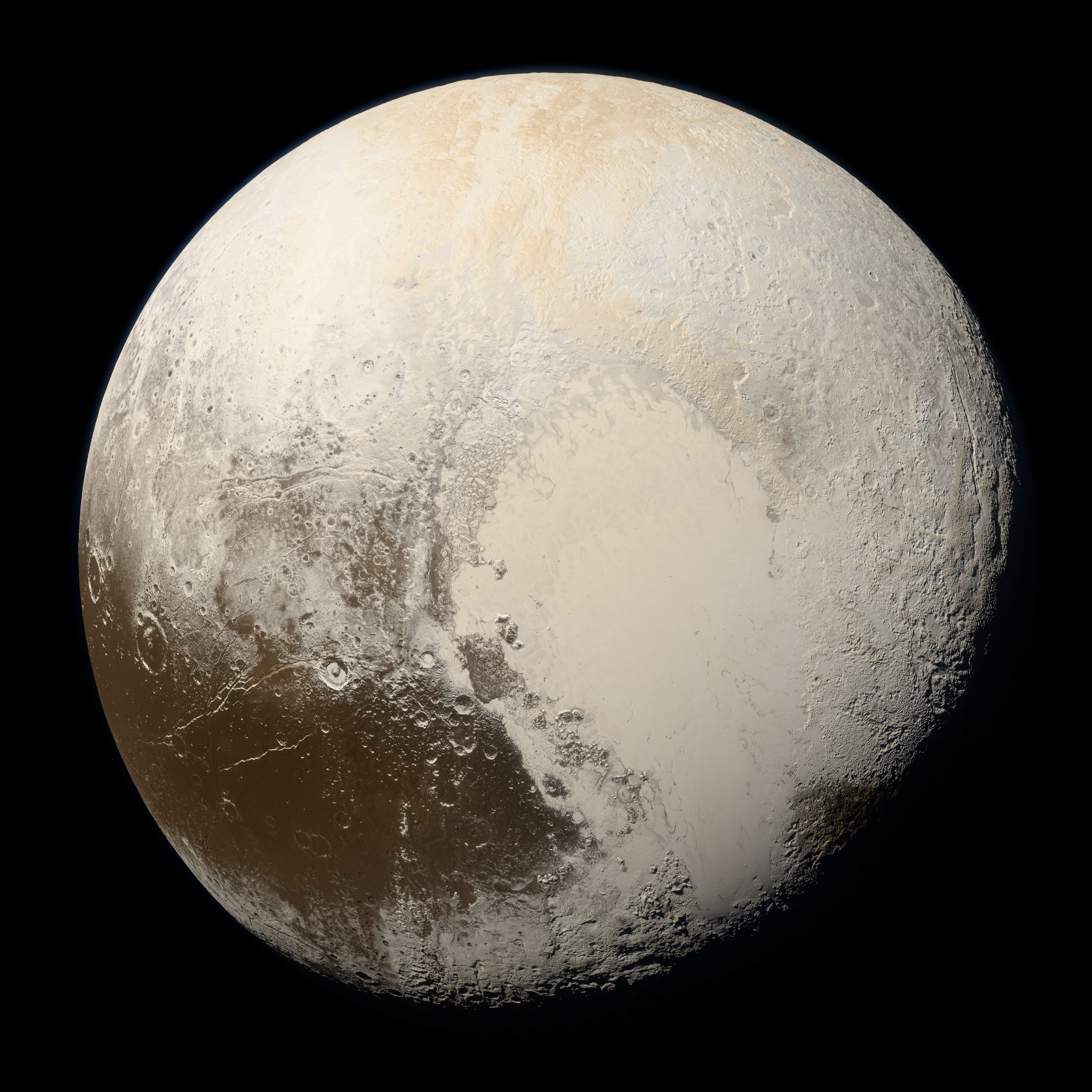
Pluto, a dwarf planet that typically orbits outside Neptune, is vastly small in comparison to Jupiter, and much farther away.

The Jovian–Plutonian gravitational effect was a hoax phenomenon broadcast on BBC Radio 2 on 1 April 1976. The hoax purported that a conjunction of the planets Jupiter and former planet Pluto would cause a noticeable short-term reduction in gravity on Earth. The hoax was invented for April Fools' Day by the English astronomer Patrick Moore.

== Background ==
Patrick Moore (4 March 1923 – 9 December 2012) was a leader of British television astronomers, having a long career in public service broadcasting. He was a wartime navigator in the Royal Air Force's Bomber Command and he was elected a Fellow of the Royal Astronomical Society in 1945 and presented BBC Television's The Sky at Night programme from 1957 until his death. He was appointed an Officer of the Order of the British Empire in 1968.

The planet Jupiter is two and a half times as massive as all of the other planets in the Solar System combined. On the contrast, Pluto is so small and so remote from the Sun and the Earth that it was not discovered until 1930. It was classified as a planet at the time and remained as such for 76 years until 2006, when the International Astronomical Union reclassified it as a dwarf planet, as it belongs to a belt of many similar small objects. Thus, at the time of the hoax, Pluto was considered to be the ninth planet in the solar system.

== The hoax ==
On 1 April 1976, Moore stated to radio listeners that an astronomical event would take place at 9:47 a.m. that day, a conjunction of Jupiter and Pluto, which was expected to have an effect observable everywhere. As Pluto passed behind Jupiter, it would briefly cause a powerful combination of the two planets' gravitational forces which would noticeably decrease gravity on Earth. If listeners were to jump into the air at that exact moment, they would find they felt a floating sensation.

Soon after 9:47 on that morning, the BBC began to receive hundreds of telephone calls from people reporting they had observed the decrease in gravity. One woman who called in even stated that she and eleven friends had been sitting and had been "wafted from their chairs and orbited gently around the room".

The story was quickly revealed afterwards as an April Fools' Day hoax. Martin Wainwright later wrote in The Guardian that Moore was "an ideal presenter" to carry off the hoax, with his delivery having "an added air of batty enthusiasm that only added to his credibility".

== See also ==
- Pluto in fiction
- Jupiter in fiction
- The Jupiter Effect
- The War of the Worlds (radio drama)
