= FGP =

FGP may refer to

- Facility Credit Guarantee Program of the United States Department of Agriculture
- Ferrellgas, an American energy company
- Floral Genome Project
- Flying geese paradigm
- Four Golden Princesses, a Malaysian girl group
- Fundic gland polyposis
- Fresh ground pepper (as a cooking ingredient)
- Federal Judicial Police (Dutch: Federale Gerechtelijke Politie), part of the Belgian Federal Police
