= Plant morphology =

Study of the structure of plants

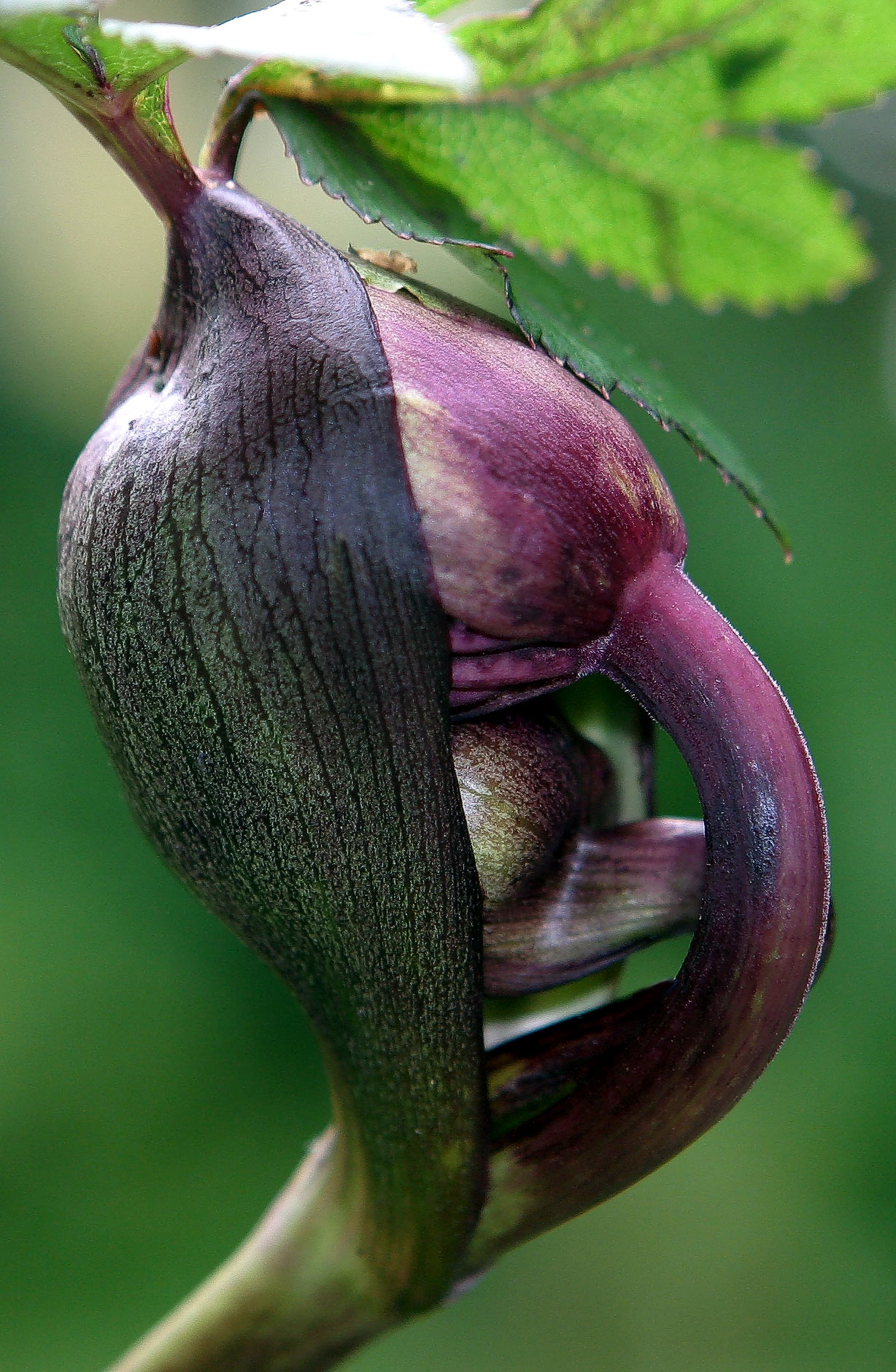
Inflorescences emerging from protective coverings of Angelica gigas

Plant morphology or phytomorphology is the study of the physical form and external structure of plants. This is usually considered distinct from plant anatomy, which is the study of the internal structure of plants, especially at the microscopic level. Plant morphology is useful in the visual identification of plants. Recent studies in molecular biology started to investigate the molecular processes involved in determining the conservation and diversification of plant morphologies. In these studies, transcriptome conservation patterns were found to mark crucial ontogenetic transitions during the plant life cycle which may result in evolutionary constraints limiting diversification.

== Scope ==
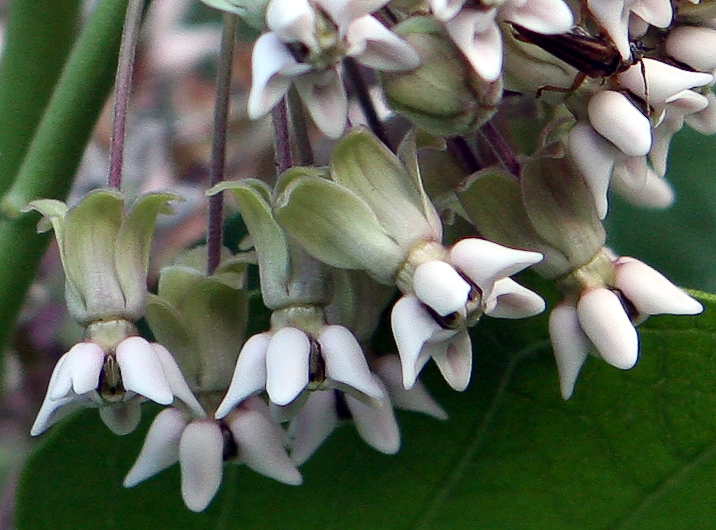
Asclepias syriaca showing complex morphology of the flowers.

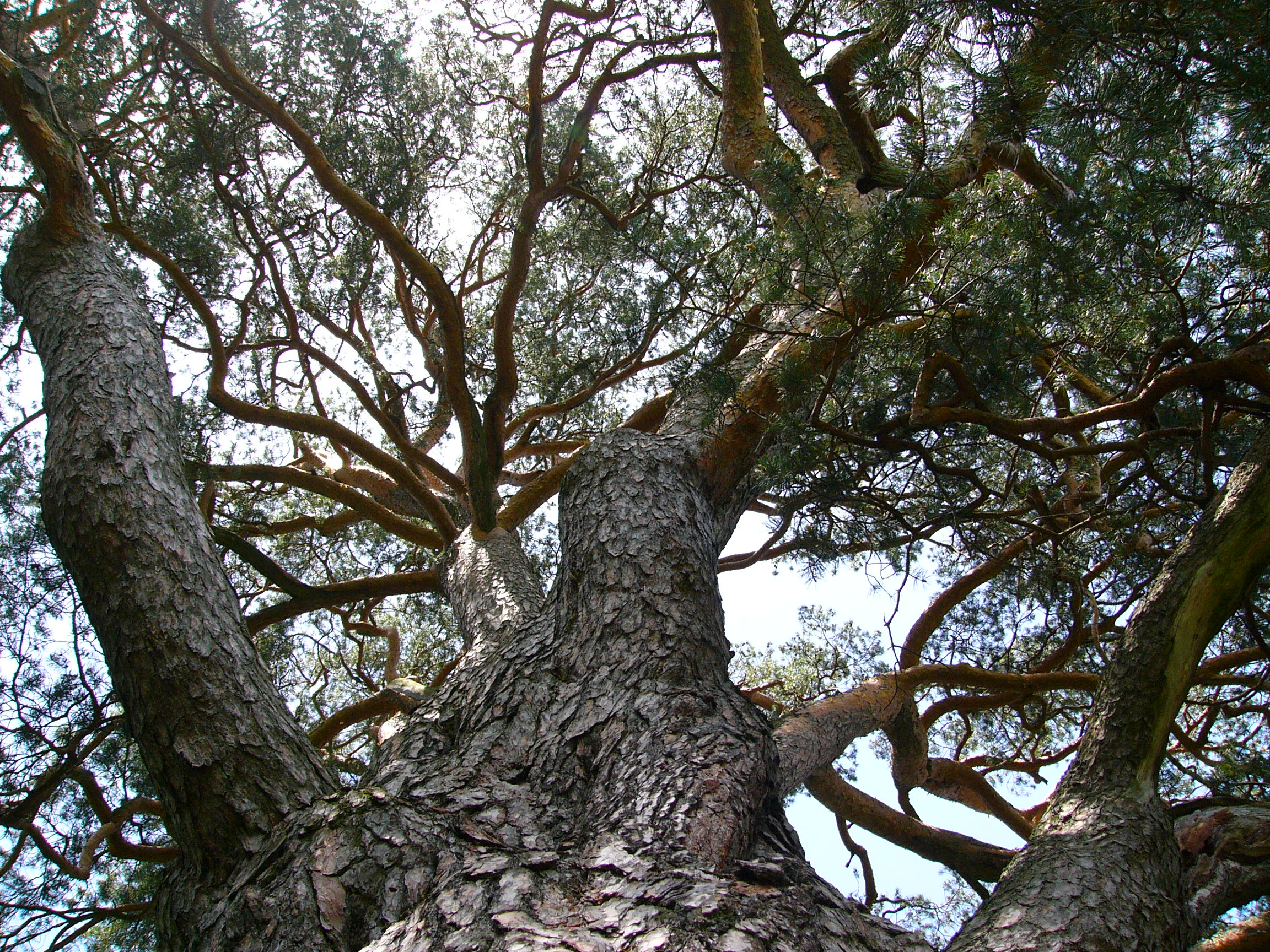
Looking up into the branch structure of a Pinus sylvestris tree

Animation of zooming into the leaf of a Sequoia sempervirens (Californian Redwood).

Plant morphology "represents a study of the development, form, and structure of plants, and, by implication, an attempt to interpret these on the basis of similarity of plan and origin". There are four major areas of investigation in plant morphology, and each overlaps with another field of the biological sciences.

First of all, morphology is comparative, meaning that the morphologist examines structures in many different plants of the same or different species, then draws comparisons and formulates ideas about similarities. When structures in different species are believed to exist and develop as a result of common, inherited genetic pathways, those structures are termed homologous. For example, the leaves of pine, oak, and cabbage all look very different, but share certain basic structures and arrangement of parts. The homology of leaves is an easy conclusion to make. The plant morphologist goes further, and discovers that the spines of cactus also share the same basic structure and development as leaves in other plants, and therefore cactus spines are homologous to leaves as well. This aspect of plant morphology overlaps with the study of plant evolution and paleobotany.

Secondly, plant morphology observes both the vegetative (somatic) structures of plants, as well as the reproductive structures. The vegetative structures of vascular plants includes the study of the shoot system, composed of stems and leaves, as well as the root system. The reproductive structures are more varied, and are usually specific to a particular group of plants, such as flowers and seeds, fern sori, and moss capsules. The detailed study of reproductive structures in plants led to the discovery of the alternation of generations found in all plants and most algae. This area of plant morphology overlaps with the study of biodiversity and plant systematics.

Thirdly, plant morphology studies plant structure at a range of scales. At the smallest scales are ultrastructure, the general structural features of cells visible only with the aid of an electron microscope, and cytology, the study of cells using optical microscopy. At this scale, plant morphology overlaps with plant anatomy as a field of study. At the largest scale is the study of plant growth habit, the overall architecture of a plant. The pattern of branching in a tree will vary from species to species, as will the appearance of a plant as a tree, herb, or grass.

Fourthly, plant morphology examines the pattern of development, the process by which structures originate and mature as a plant grows. While animals produce all the body parts they will ever have from early in their life, plants constantly produce new tissues and structures throughout their life. A living plant always has embryonic tissues. The way in which new structures mature as they are produced may be affected by the point in the plant's life when they begin to develop, as well as by the environment to which the structures are exposed. A morphologist studies this process, the causes, and its result. This area of plant morphology overlaps with plant physiology and ecology.

== A comparative science ==
A plant morphologist makes comparisons between structures in many different plants of the same or different species. Making such comparisons between similar structures in different plants tackles the question of why the structures are similar. It is quite likely that similar underlying causes of genetics, physiology, or response to the environment have led to this similarity in appearance. The result of scientific investigation into these causes can lead to one of two insights into the underlying biology:

1. Homology - the structure is similar between the two species because of shared ancestry and common genetics.
2. Convergence - the structure is similar between the two species because of independent adaptation to common environmental pressures.

Understanding which characteristics and structures belong to each type is an important part of understanding plant evolution. The evolutionary biologist relies on the plant morphologist to interpret structures, and in turn provides phylogenies of plant relationships that may lead to new morphological insights.

=== Homology ===
When structures in different species are believed to exist and develop as a result of common, inherited genetic pathways, those structures are termed homologous. For example, the leaves of pine, oak, and cabbage all look very different, but share certain basic structures and arrangement of parts. The homology of leaves is an easy conclusion to make. The plant morphologist goes further, and discovers that the spines of cactus also share the same basic structure and development as leaves in other plants, and therefore cactus spines are homologous to leaves as well.

=== Convergence ===
When structures in different species are believed to exist and develop as a result of common adaptive responses to environmental pressure, those structures are termed convergent. For example, the fronds of Bryopsis plumosa and stems of Asparagus setaceus both have the same feathery branching appearance, even though one is an alga and one is a flowering plant. The similarity in overall structure occurs independently as a result of convergence. The growth form of many cacti and species of Euphorbia is very similar, even though they belong to widely distant families. The similarity results from common solutions to the problem of surviving in a hot, dry environment.

== Vegetative and reproductive characteristics ==
A diagram representing a "typical" eudicot.

Plant morphology treats both the vegetative structures of plants, as well as the reproductive structures.

The vegetative (somatic) structures of vascular plants include two major organ systems: (1) a shoot system, composed of stems and leaves, and (2) a root system. These two systems are common to nearly all vascular plants, and provide a unifying theme for the study of plant morphology.

By contrast, the reproductive structures are varied, and are usually specific to a particular group of plants. Structures such as flowers and fruits are only found in the angiosperms; sori are only found in ferns; and seed cones are only found in conifers and other gymnosperms. Reproductive characters are therefore regarded as more useful for the classification of plants than vegetative characters.

=== Use in identification ===
Plant biologists use morphological characters of plants which can be compared, measured, counted and described to assess the differences or similarities in plant taxa and use these characters for plant identification, classification and descriptions.

When characters are used in descriptions or for identification they are called diagnostic or key characters which can be either qualitative and quantitative.

1. Quantitative characters are morphological features that can be counted or measured for example a plant species has flower petals 10–12 mm wide.
2. Qualitative characters are morphological features such as leaf shape, flower color or pubescence.

Both kinds of characters can be very useful for the identification of plants.

=== Alternation of generations ===
The detailed study of reproductive structures in plants led to the discovery of the alternation of generations, found in all plants and most algae, by the German botanist Wilhelm Hofmeister. This discovery is one of the most important made in all of plant morphology, since it provides a common basis for understanding the life cycle of all plants.

=== Pigmentation in plants ===
The primary function of pigments in plants is photosynthesis, which uses the green pigment chlorophyll along with several red and yellow pigments that help to capture as much light energy as possible, the other pigments ic carotenoids. Pigments are also an important factor in attracting insects to flowers to encourage pollination.

Plant pigments include a variety of different kinds of molecule, including porphyrins, carotenoids, anthocyanins and betalains. All biological pigments selectively absorb certain wavelengths of light while reflecting others. The light that is absorbed may be used by the plant to power chemical reactions, while the reflected wavelengths of light determine the color the pigment will appear to the eye.

== Morphology in development ==
Plant development is the process by which structures originate and mature as a plant grows. It is a subject studied in plant anatomy and plant physiology as well as plant morphology.

The process of development in plants is fundamentally different from that seen in vertebrate animals. When an animal embryo begins to develop, it will very early produce all of the body parts that it will ever have in its life. When the animal is born (or hatches from its egg), it has all its body parts and from that point will only grow larger and more mature. By contrast, plants constantly produce new tissues and structures throughout their life from meristems located at the tips of organs, or between mature tissues. Thus, a living plant always has embryonic tissues.

The properties of organisation seen in a plant are emergent properties which are more than the sum of the individual parts. "The assembly of these tissues and functions into an integrated multicellular organism yields not only the characteristics of the separate parts and processes but also quite a new set of characteristics which would not have been predictable on the basis of examination of the separate parts." In other words, knowing everything about the molecules in a plant are not enough to predict characteristics of the cells; and knowing all the properties of the cells will not predict all the properties of a plant's structure.

=== Growth ===
A vascular plant begins from a single celled zygote, formed by fertilisation of an egg cell by a sperm cell. From that point, it begins to divide to form a plant embryo through the process of embryogenesis. As this happens, the resulting cells will organise so that one end becomes the first root, while the other end forms the tip of the shoot. In seed plants, the embryo will develop one or more "seed leaves" (cotyledons). By the end of embryogenesis, the young plant will have all the parts necessary to begin in its life.

Once the embryo germinates from its seed or parent plant, it begins to produce additional organs (leaves, stems, and roots) through the process of organogenesis. New roots grow from root meristems located at the tip of the root, and new stems and leaves grow from shoot meristems located at the tip of the shoot. Branching occurs when small clumps of cells left behind by the meristem, and which have not yet undergone cellular differentiation to form a specialised tissue, begin to grow form the tip of a new root or shoot. Growth from any such meristem at the tip of a root or shoot is termed primary growth and results in the lengthening of that root or shoot. Secondary growth results in widening of a root or shoot from divisions of cells in a cambium.

In addition to growth by cell division, a plant may grow through cell elongation. This occurs when individual cells or groups of cells grow longer. Not all plant cells will grow to the same length. When cells on one side of a stem grow longer and faster than cells on the other side, the stem will bend to the side of the slower growing cells as a result. This directional growth can occur via a plant's response to a particular stimulus, such as light (phototropism), gravity (gravitropism), water, (hydrotropism), and physical contact (thigmotropism).

Plant growth and development are mediated by specific plant hormones and plant growth regulators (PGRs) (Ross et al. 1983). Endogenous hormone levels are influenced by plant age, cold hardiness, dormancy, and other metabolic conditions; photoperiod, drought, temperature, and other external environmental conditions; and exogenous sources of PGRs, e.g., externally applied and of rhizospheric origin.

=== Morphological variation ===
Plants exhibit natural variation in their form and structure. While all organisms vary from individual to individual, plants exhibit an additional type of variation. Within a single individual, parts are repeated which may differ in form and structure from other similar parts. This variation is most easily seen in the leaves of a plant, though other organs such as stems and flowers may show similar variation. There are three primary causes of this variation: positional effects, environmental effects, and juvenility.

=== Evolution of plant morphology ===
Transcription factors and transcriptional regulatory networks play key roles in plant morphogenesis and their evolution. During plant landing, many novel transcription factor families emerged and are preferentially wired into the networks of multicellular development, reproduction, and organ development, contributing to more complex morphogenesis of land plants.

==== Positional effects ====
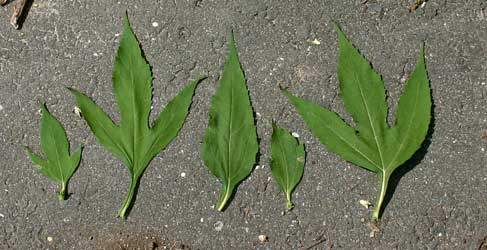
Variation in leaves from the giant ragweed illustrating positional effects. The lobed leaves come from the base of the plant, while the unlobed leaves come from the top of the plant.

Although plants produce numerous copies of the same organ during their lives, not all copies of a particular organ will be identical. There is variation among the parts of a mature plant resulting from the relative position where the organ is produced. For example, along a new branch the leaves may vary in a consistent pattern along the branch. The form of leaves produced near the base of the branch will differ from leaves produced at the tip of the plant, and this difference is consistent from branch to branch on a given plant and in a given species. This difference persists after the leaves at both ends of the branch have matured, and is not the result of some leaves being younger than others.

==== Environmental effects ====
The way in which new structures mature as they are produced may be affected by the point in the plant's life when they begin to develop, as well as by the environment to which the structures are exposed. This can be seen in aquatic plants.

===== Temperature =====
Temperature has a multiplicity of effects on plants depending on a variety of factors, including the size and condition of the plant and the temperature and duration of exposure. The smaller and more succulent the plant, the greater the susceptibility to damage or death from temperatures that are too high or too low. Temperature affects the rate of biochemical and physiological processes, rates generally (within limits) increasing with temperature. However, the Van't Hoff relationship for monomolecular reactions (which states that the velocity of a reaction is doubled or trebled by a temperature increase of 10 °C) does not strictly hold for biological processes, especially at low and high temperatures.

When water freezes in plants, the consequences for the plant depend very much on whether the freezing occurs intracellularly (within cells) or outside cells in intercellular (extracellular) spaces. Intracellular freezing usually kills the cell regardless of the hardiness of the plant and its tissues. Intracellular freezing seldom occurs in nature, but moderate rates of decrease in temperature, e.g., 1 °C to 6 °C/hour, cause intercellular ice to form, and this "extraorgan ice" may or may not be lethal, depending on the hardiness of the tissue.

At freezing temperatures, water in the intercellular spaces of plant tissues freezes first, though the water may remain unfrozen until temperatures fall below 7 °C. After the initial formation of ice intercellularly, the cells shrink as water is lost to the segregated ice. The cells undergo freeze-drying, the dehydration being the basic cause of freezing injury.

The rate of cooling has been shown to influence the frost resistance of tissues, but the actual rate of freezing will depend not only on the cooling rate, but also on the degree of supercooling and the properties of the tissue. Sakai (1979a) demonstrated ice segregation in shoot primordia of Alaskan white and black spruces when cooled slowly to 30 °C to -40 °C. These freeze-dehydrated buds survived immersion in liquid nitrogen when slowly rewarmed. Floral primordia responded similarly. Extraorgan freezing in the primordia accounts for the ability of the hardiest of the boreal conifers to survive winters in regions when air temperatures often fall to -50 °C or lower. The hardiness of the winter buds of such conifers is enhanced by the smallness of the buds, by the evolution of faster translocation of water, and an ability to tolerate intensive freeze dehydration. In boreal species of Picea and Pinus, the frost resistance of 1-year-old seedlings is on a par with mature plants, given similar states of dormancy.

==== Juvenility ====
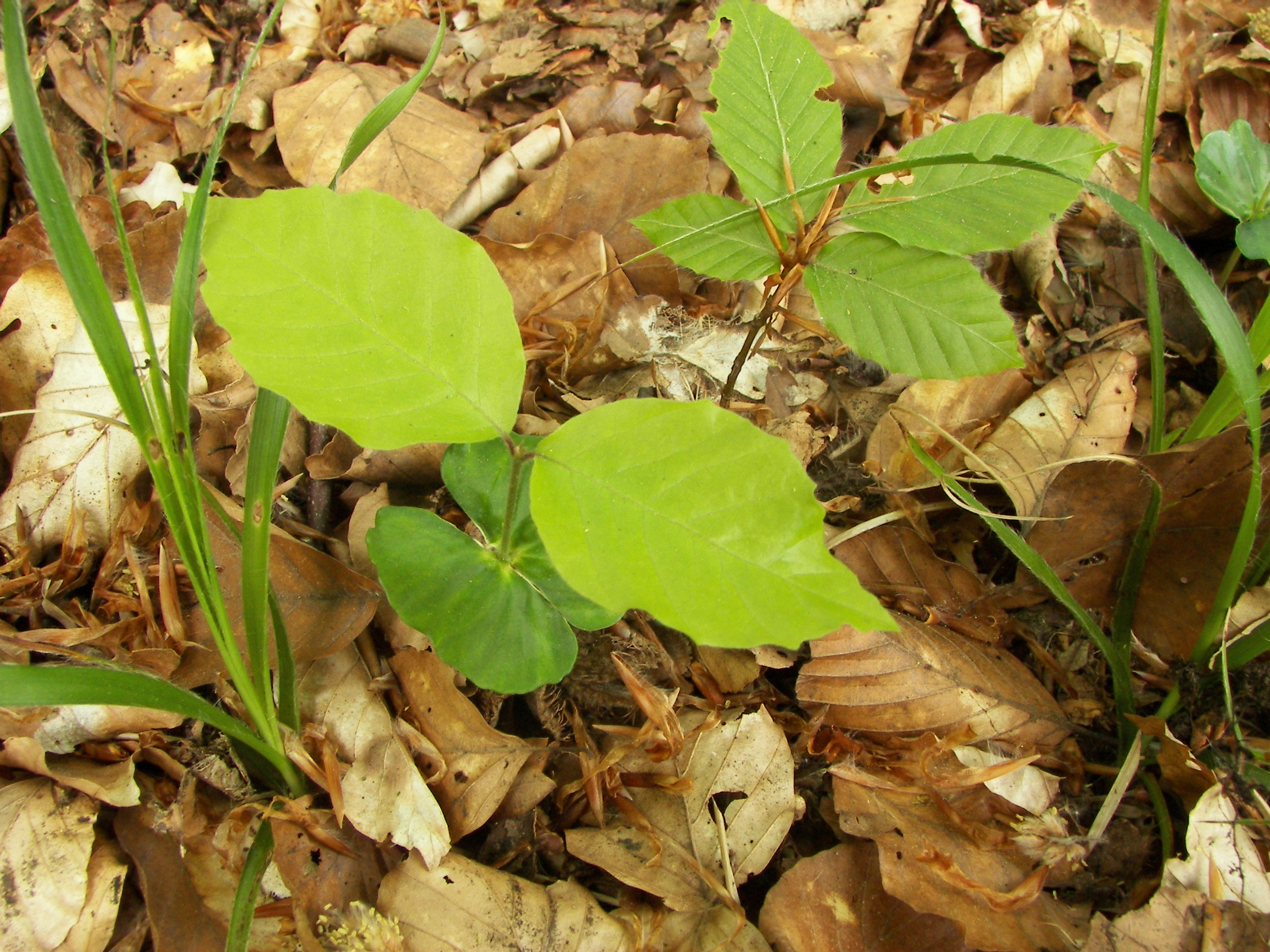
Juvenility in a seedling of European beech. There is a marked difference in shape between the first dark green "seed leaves" and the lighter second pair of leaves.

The organs and tissues produced by a young plant, such as a seedling, are often different from those that are produced by the same plant when it is older. This phenomenon is known as juvenility or heteroblasty. For example, young trees will produce longer, leaner branches that grow upwards more than the branches they will produce as a fully grown tree. In addition, leaves produced during early growth tend to be larger, thinner, and more irregular than leaves on the adult plant. Specimens of juvenile plants may look so completely different from adult plants of the same species that egg-laying insects do not recognise the plant as food for their young. Differences are seen in rootability and flowering and can be seen in the same mature tree. Juvenile cuttings taken from the base of a tree will form roots much more readily than cuttings originating from the mid to upper crown. Flowering close to the base of a tree is absent or less profuse than flowering in the higher branches especially when a young tree first reaches flowering age.

The transition from early to late growth forms is referred to as 'vegetative phase change', but there is some disagreement about terminology.

== Modern Innovations ==
Rolf Sattler has revised fundamental concepts of comparative morphology such as the concept of homology. He emphasised that homology should also include partial homology and quantitative homology. This leads to a continuum morphology that demonstrates a continuum between the morphological categories of root, shoot, stem (caulome), leaf (phyllome), and hair (trichome). How intermediates between the categories are best described has been discussed by Bruce K. Kirchoff et al. A recent study conducted by Salk Institute extracted coordinates corresponding to each plant's base and leaves in 3D space. When plants on the graph were placed according to their actual nutrient travel distances and total branch lengths, the plants fell almost perfectly on the Pareto curve. "This means the way plants grow their architectures also optimises a very common network design tradeoff. Based on the environment and the species, the plant is selecting different ways to make tradeoffs for those particular environmental conditions."

Honoring Agnes Arber, author of the partial-shoot theory of the leaf, Rutishauser and Isler called the continuum approach Fuzzy Arberian Morphology (FAM). "Fuzzy" refers to fuzzy logic, "Arberian" to Agnes Arber. Rutishauser and Isler emphasised that this approach is not only supported by many morphological data but also by evidence from molecular genetics. More recent evidence from molecular genetics provides further support for continuum morphology. James (2009) concluded that "it is now widely accepted that... radiality [characteristic of most stems] and dorsiventrality [characteristic of leaves] are but extremes of a continuous spectrum. In fact, it is simply the timing of the KNOX gene expression!." Eckardt and Baum (2010) concluded that "it is now generally accepted that compound leaves express both leaf and shoot properties."

Process morphology describes and analyses the dynamic continuum of plant form. According to this approach, structures do not have process(es), they are process(es). Thus, the structure/process dichotomy is overcome by "an enlargement of our concept of 'structure' so as to include and recognise that in the living organism it is not merely a question of spatial structure with an 'activity' as something over or against it, but that the concrete organism is a spatio-temporal structure and that this spatio-temporal structure is the activity itself".

For Jeune, Barabé and Lacroix, classical morphology (that is, mainstream morphology, based on a qualitative homology concept implying mutually exclusive categories) and continuum morphology are sub-classes of the more encompassing process morphology (dynamic morphology).

Classical morphology, continuum morphology, and process morphology are highly relevant to plant evolution, especially the field of plant evolutionary biology (plant evo-devo) that tries to integrate plant morphology and plant molecular genetics. In a detailed case study on unusual morphologies, Rutishauser (2016) illustrated and discussed various topics of plant evo-devo such as the fuzziness (continuity) of morphological concepts, the lack of a one-to-one correspondence between structural categories and gene expression, the notion of morphospace, the adaptive value of bauplan features versus patio ludens, physiological adaptations, hopeful monsters and saltational evolution, the significance and limits of developmental robustness, etc. Rutishauser (2020) discussed the past and future of plant evo-devo. Our conception of the gynoecium and the search for a fossil ancestor of Angiosperms changes fundamentally from the perspective of evo-devo.

Morphological research is influenced by philosophical assumptions such as either/or logic, fuzzy logic, structure/process dualism or its transcendence. Empirical findings may influence the philosophical assumptions, while philosophical assumptions orient the direction of research. These interactions between philosophy and empirical findings are referred to as the philosophy of plant morphology.

In 2022, Donal R. Kaplan published Principles of Plant Morphology. It is a major, illustrated collection of morphological data, interpreted in terms of classical morphology and the qualitative homology concept, disregarding modern conceptional innovations. Including continuum and process morphology as well as molecular genetics would provide an enlarged scope.

An even more important event was the publication of a book by Regine Claβen-Bockhoff (2024) Die Pflanze: Morphologie, Entwicklung und Evolution von Vielfalt (The Plant: Morphology, Development and Evolution of Diversity). Like Kaplan's book, this book is very comprehensive (over a thousand pages) and beautifully illustrated (she worked with two illustrators), but unlike Kaplan's book, her book presents major conceptual innovations. Although, for the vegetative region, she accepts the categories of classical morphology, contrary to Kaplan, she recognizes that not all structures can be pressed into these categories. For flowers, she abandoned the classical framework altogether. Instead of interpreting the flower as a modified short shoot (as posited by classical morphology), she proposed that flowers are sporangia bearing units so that stamens and carpels are sporangiophores, which are considered 'de novo' structures not necessarily homologous with vegetative leaves.

Rolf Sattler proposed an Articulation Morphology. It is based on the open growth of plants, which occurs through ramification that leads to articulation - the formation of articles between successive ramifications or after a single ramification. Thus, the plant is seen as an articulated whole, consisting of articles. The concept of the article encompasses the continuum between morphological categories and different levels of organization, from organ systems to organs, parts of organs and trichomes. Furthermore, it applies to all plants, from algae to bryophytes and vascular plants. In articulation morphology, the central and most basic concept is no longer morphological homology but transformation: transformation of ramification and articulation. This changes the most basic questions we ask. Instead of asking questions about morphological homology, we ask how ramification and articulation have changed during development and evolution. For this reason, articulation morphology may be considered a new paradigm of plant morphology. It changes fundamentally our way of thinking about morphology and morphological investigation.

== See also ==
- Glossary of plant morphology
- Plant anatomy
- Plant identification
- Plant physiology
- Plant evolutionary developmental biology
- Taxonomy
