= Seed dispersal syndrome =

Methods of plant seed dispersal

Seed dispersal syndromes are morphological characters of seeds correlated to particular seed dispersal agents. Dispersal is the event by which individuals move from the site of their parents to establish in a new area. A seed disperser is the vector by which a seed moves from its parent to the resting place where the individual will establish, for instance an animal. Similar to the term syndrome, a diaspore is a morphological functional unit of a seed for dispersal purposes.

Characteristics for seed dispersal syndromes are commonly fruit colour, mass, and persistence. These syndrome characteristics are often associated with the fruit that carries the seeds. Fruits are packages for seeds, composed of nutritious tissues to feed animals. However, fruit pulp is not commonly used as a seed dispersal syndrome because pulp nutritional value does not enhance seed dispersal success. Animals interact with these fruits because they are a common food source for them. Although, not all seed dispersal syndromes have fruits because not all seeds are dispersed by animals. Suitable biological and environmental conditions of dispersal syndromes are needed for seed dispersal and invasion success such as temperature and moisture.

Seed dispersal syndromes are parallel to pollination syndromes, which are defined as floral characteristics that attract organisms as pollinators. They are considered parallels because they are both plant-animal interactions, which increase the reproductive success of a plant. However, seed dispersal syndromes are more common in gymnosperms, while pollination syndromes are found in angiosperms. Seeds disperse to increase the reproductive success of the plant. The farther away a seed is from a parent, the better its chances of survival and germination. Therefore, a plant should select certain traits to increase dispersal by a vector (i.e. bird) to increase the reproductive success of the plant.

== Evolution ==
Seeds have evolved traits to reward animals to enhance their dispersal abilities. Differing foraging behaviours of animals can lead to selection of dispersal traits and spatial variation such as increase in seed size for mammal dispersal, which can limit seed production. Seed production is limited by some seed syndromes because of their cost to the plant. Therefore, seed dispersal syndromes will evolve in a plant when the trait benefit outweighs the cost. The seed dispersers themselves play an essential role in syndrome evolution. For example, birds put strong selection pressure on seeds for colour of fruits because of their enhanced vision. Illustrations of such colour evolution include green colour being produced because its photosynthesis abilities are less costly while red colour emerges as a byproduct for protection from arthropods.

For visible characteristic differences to develop between dispersers and non-dispersers a few conditions need to be met 1. Specialization must increase dispersal success whether morphological, physiological or behavioural 2. Energy investment for dispersal will be taken from energy investment of other traits 3. Dispersal traits will benefit the dispersers over non-dispersers. Phenotypic (visible characteristics) differences in non-dispersers and dispersers can be caused by external factors, kin competition, intraspecific competition and habitat quality.

== History ==
In 1930, Ridley wrote an important book called The dispersal of plants throughout the world, which goes into detail about each form of dispersal; dispersal by wind, water, animals, birds, reptiles and fish, adhesion, and people. He details the morphology and traits for each dispersal method, which are later described as seed dispersal syndromes. This began the idea of seed trait selection being associated with a form of seed dispersal. Then in 1969 van der Pijl identified seed dispersal syndromes based on each mechanism of seed dispersal in his book Principles of Dispersal in Higher Plants. He is the pinnacle of seed dispersal syndromes and is cited by many scientists who study seed dispersal syndromes. He describes the morphology of interactions between fruits and flowers, and classifies dispersal in invertebrates, fish, reptiles, birds, mammals, ants, wind, water and the plant itself. Janson in 1983 continued the study on seed dispersal syndromes and classified seed dispersal syndromes of fruit by size, colour and husk or no husks in species of Peruvian tropical forest. He went in depth about the interaction between plants that have adapted to seed dispersal by birds and mammals. Willson, Irvine & Walsh in 1989 added more factors to the study of seed dispersal syndromes and looked at differing fleshy fruits and their correlation to moisture and differing ecological factors. They looked at bird-dispersal and mammal-dispersal and how the fruits differed in dispersal syndromes such as colour and size. These scientists began the theory and ideas behind seed dispersal syndromes that are crucial to the evolution of reproduction in plants.

== Types and functions ==
Dispersal syndromes have been previously classified by: size, colour, weight, protection, flesh type, number of seeds, weight and start time of ripening. Syndromes are often associated with the type of dispersal and morphology. Also chemical composition can influence the disperser's fruit choice. The following are types of seed dispersal and their syndromes.

=== Anemochory ===
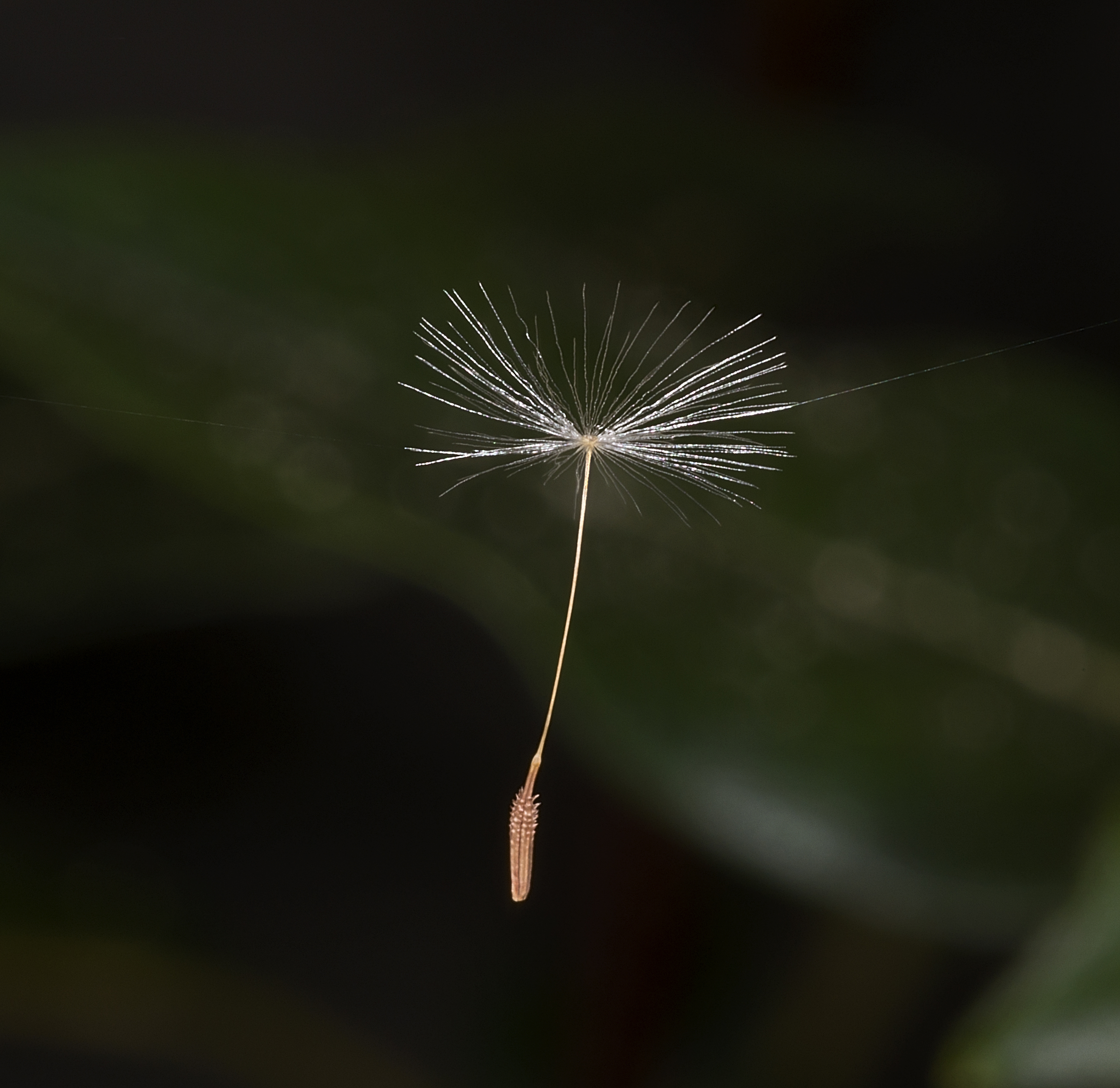
Example of a syndrome of anemochory

Anemochory is defined as seed dispersal by wind. Common dispersal syndromes of anemochory are wing structures and brown or dull coloured seeds without further rewards. Van der Pijl named seeds for anemochory flyers, rollers, or throwers to represent the seed dispersal syndromes and their behaviour. Flyers are typically categorized as dust diaspores, balloons, plumed or winged. Dust diaspores are small flat structures on seeds that appear to be the transition to wing diaspores, balloons are inflated seed characteristics and plumes are hairs or elongation seed characteristics. Wings have evolved to increase dispersal distance to promote gene flow. Anemochory is commonly found in open habitats, canopy trees, and dry season deciduous forests. Wind dispersers mature in the dry season for optimum high long-distance dispersal to increase success of germination.

=== Barochory ===
Barochory is seed dispersal by gravity alone in which a plant's seeds fall beneath the parent plant. These seeds commonly have heavy seed dispersal syndromes. However, heavy seeds may not be a form of seed dispersal syndrome, but a random seed characteristic that has no dispersal purpose. It has been thought that barochory does not develop a seed dispersal syndrome because it does not select for characters to enhance dispersal. It is questionable whether barochory is dispersal at all.

=== Hydrochory ===
Hydrochory is seed dispersal by water. Seeds can disperse by rain or ice or be submerged in water. Seeds dispersed by water need to have the ability to float and resist water damage. They often have hairs to assist with enlargement and floating. More features that cause floating are air space, lightweight tissues and corky tissues. Hydrochory syndromes are most common in aquatic plants.

=== Zoochory ===
Zoochory is the dispersal of seeds by animals and can be further divided into three classes.

1. Endozoochory is seed dispersal by animal ingestion and defecation or regurgitation of a seed. In a mutualistic behavior, the animal is rewarded with nutritious fruit while harmlessly dispersing the seed or seeds, thereby increasing their fitness and chances for survival.
2. Synzoochory is dispersal of diaspores by the mouthparts of animals, and
3. Epizoochory is the accidental dispersal by animals. Differing characteristics of zoochory syndromes include coloured fruits, scented fruits, and different textures for different animals.

Endozoochory syndrome characteristics will develop based on palatability of the fruit by an organism. For example, mammals are attracted to scent of a seed and birds are attracted to colour. Endozoochory syndromes have evolved to be ingested by animals and later bypassed in a new environment so the seed can germinate. Synzoochory should possess hard skins to protect seeds from damage of mouthparts; for example, sharp beaks on animals such as birds or turtles. Epizoochory commonly has burrs or spines to transport seeds on the outside of animals. These syndromes are highly associated with animals that have fur, while burrs would be lacking on seeds that are dispersed by reptiles because of their smooth skin. It is believed that not all animals that interact with plant fruits are dispersers because some animals do not increase the successful dispersal of seeds but consume and destroy them. Therefore, some animals are dispersers and some are consumers.

=== Mammalochory ===
Mammalochory is specifically the seed dispersal by mammals. The dispersal syndromes for mammalochory include large fleshy fruit, green or dull coloured fruits, and husked or unhusked. The seeds tend to have more protection to prevent mechanical destruction. Mammals rely on smell more than vision for foraging, which causes the seeds they disperse to be more scented compared to bird-dispersed seeds. Animal-dispersed seeds ripen in rainy season when foraging activity is high, resulting in fleshy diaspores. Mammals consume fruits whole or in smaller pieces, which explains the larger seed syndromes. Mammalochory syndromes can increase the reproductive success of the plant compared to seed dispersal syndromes of a plant associated with barochory for example. An example of seed dispersal syndromes associated with mammals that increases reproductive success would be seed-consuming rodents that increase germination by burial of seeds.

=== Ornithochory ===
Ornithochory is seed dispersal by birds. Common syndrome characteristics include small fleshy fruits with bright colours and without husks. Ornithochory is common in temperate zones and oceanic islands because of absence of native mammals. Birds have heightened colour vision and swallow seeds and fruits whole, explaining the small and coloured characteristics of dispersal syndromes. Birds have a weak sense of smell, therefore ornithochory syndromes would specialize more in colour than scent, in comparison to mammalochory. Ornithochory can increase the reproductive success of a plant because a bird's digestive tract increases seed germination after it has been bypassed and dispersed by the bird.

=== Myrmecochory ===
Myrmecochory is seed dispersal by ants. Myrmecochory is considered an ant-plant mutualistic relationship. The common syndrome traits for myrmecochory are elaiosomes, and are often hard and difficult to damage. Elaiosomes are structures that attract ants because they are high in lipid content, providing important nutrients for the ant. Without ants, seed dispersal becomes barochory and dispersal success declines. It is debated if ants are good dispersers and if plants would select for ant dispersal. Ants do clearly interact with seeds, however ants cannot travel very long distances. Therefore, would a plant select for a bird over an ant when birds can disperse seeds much farther than ants, increasing a plant's reproductive success.

== Problems ==
Some scientists are skeptical whether seed dispersal syndromes actually exist because their parallel, pollination syndromes, are often disputed in scientific literature. Seed dispersal syndromes do not seem to have much disagreement among scientists. It is unclear whether this is due to lack of research or interest in seed dispersal syndromes, or that scientists agree with the idea of seed dispersal syndromes. It also may be that seed dispersal syndromes are harder to test because once seeds disperse they are difficult to collect and study. Jordano (1995) states that the evolution of fruit traits for seed dispersal success is only dependent on diameter. This is one scientist's perspective but does not appear to be the common consensus among scientists. Colour and olfaction are other common seed dispersal syndromes tested and discussed in scientific literature, with equivocal results. One possible reason is that adaptive variation in fruit colours could be scale dependent, occurring only on broad taxonomic scales rather than within assemblages of either bird-dispersed or mammal-dispersed fruit species. One limitation to seed dispersal syndromes mentioned is the limited definitions of syndrome characteristics such as odour or texture. It is possible that there has not been enough research to test these characteristics or they do not play a role in seed dispersal syndromes.

The differences in seed dispersal syndromes appear to be weak, but do exist. There needs to be consideration for the possibility that these syndromes evolved not to benefit seed dispersal but possibility to combat other selective pressures. For example, syndromes may have developed to combat predation or environmental hazards. Predation could produce a secondary metabolite syndrome. Secondary metabolites are compounds that are not used for the primary function of a plant and are normally used as defense mechanisms.

== Further research ==
Seed dispersal syndromes have not been studied in complete breadth for every seed dispersal method. Therefore, further research should be conducted to fill the gaps of knowledge about dispersal syndromes. The following are problem areas or directions research can continue on the study of seed dispersal syndromes. There is a lack of understanding of morphology in correlation to behavioural traits of dispersers. Research in this area would assist in the understanding of why particular dispersers are selected by plants to enhance reproductive success. Also, understanding movement strategies of factors affecting departure to settlement is important in determining whether seed dispersal syndromes are only affect by plant selection for a disperser. There are few studies concerning phenotype-dependent dispersal and how it affects spatial structures of populations. Distance of dispersal is not researched in enough detail to correlate to a seed dispersal syndrome. More experimental field studies on plant-animal interactions regarding seed dispersal need to be conducted for a thorough understanding of seed dispersal syndromes. There is limited knowledge about the presence of elaisomes and ant behaviour affecting seed dispersal, and how ant-plant interactions evolved under various plant traits. Understanding these interactions would help clarify if myrmecochory did evolve seed dispersal syndromes. Micro and macroevolutionary processes are needed to determine the effects of biological dispersal of seeds. There cannot be inferences about seed dispersal syndromes without robust phylogenies and evolutionary studies. There is also a gap in the understanding of genetic consequences of zoochory. Using genetics could help clarify if these syndromes were formed at random or if they correspond to evolution of seed dispersal. It is unclear if these seed dispersal syndromes evolved for specialization between plants and animals to increase seed dispersal success or if these syndromes are simply formed from generalist plant-animal interactions. Understanding these relationships would clarify the confusion about seed dispersal syndromes and if they are true examples of evolution increasing plant reproductive success or if they have developed without selective pressures.
