= Rolf Sattler =

Canadian plant morphologist

Rolf Sattler FLS FRSC (born 8 March 1936) is a Canadian plant morphologist, biologist, philosopher, and educator. He is considered one of the most significant contributors to the field of plant morphology and "one of the foremost plant morphologists in the world." His contributions are not only empirical but involved also a revision of the most fundamental concepts, theories, and philosophical assumptions. He published the award-winning Organogenesis of Flowers (1973) and nearly a hundred scientific papers, mainly on plant morphology. As well he has contributed to many national and international symposia and also organized and chaired symposia at international congresses, edited the proceedings of two of them and published them as books.

Besides Biophilosophy (1986), his philosophical contributions include articles on complementarity (perspectivism), process philosophy, the mandala principle, and the convergence of science and spirituality. Additional publications deal with holistic alternative medicine and healing ways of thinking such as fuzzy logic, Yin-Yang thinking (both/and logic), and Buddhist and Jain logic.

== Life ==
Sattler was born in Göppingen, Germany. He studied botany, zoology, chemistry, philosophy and pedagogy in Germany, Austria, and Switzerland. He received his doctorate, with summa cum laude, in systematic botany from LMU Munich. As a postdoctoral fellow, he spent a year with Ludwig von Bertalanffy, one of the founders of general systems theory, at the University of Alberta in Canada. Subsequently, he worked for another year with Ernest M. Gifford and G. Ledyard Stebbins at the University of California. For 33 years, he was first assistant, then associate, and finally full professor in the departments of botany and biology of McGill University in Montreal. He became Emeritus Professor when he retired in 1997. Since retiring he has lived in Kingston, Ontario.

At McGill University he taught botany, biology, the history and philosophy of biology, and biology in relation to the human predicament. As a visiting professor at the Humboldt University of Berlin in Germany, he taught plant morphology and the philosophy of biology. At Cornell University, he was a consultant in the Summer Institute on the Philosophy of Biology. And at Naropa Institute he taught a summer course on Modern Biology and Zen.

Sattler has lectured at many universities across the globe, including Harvard University, the University of California, the University of Paris, the Humboldt University of Berlin, the University of Bonn, Heidelberg University, the University of Zurich, Delhi University, University of Malaya, and the National University of Singapore.

As well as his research in plant morphology and the philosophy of biology, he has investigated the relation of science and spirituality. He is keenly interested in holistic alternative medicine and healing thinking. He is also interested in developing a process language in which the verb, not the noun or pronoun, plays the primary role.

In 1995, he gave a talk on science and spirituality in a symposium at the 60th birthday celebrations of the Dalai Lama. There he discussed the relation between science and spirituality with special reference to life science.

== Plant morphology, science and philosophy ==
Sattler's contributions to plant morphology include the empirical, conceptual, theoretical, and philosophical. Together with his coworkers he has contributed a wealth of empirical data on shoot and leaf development and flower development.

His empirical findings led him to revision fundamental concepts of comparative morphology. He emphasized that the concepts of homology and homeosis (replacement) should also include partial homology, partial homeosis, and quantitative homology. These revisions led him to question the theoretical and philosophical foundations of comparative morphology. In contrast to mainstream morphology, which tends to be categorical, he provided evidence for a continuum morphology. Together with Bernard Jeune, he demonstrated mathematically a continuum of plant forms that spans not only organ categories such as root, stem, and leaf, but also different hierarchical levels of organ systems, organs, and tissues. Rutishauser and Isler regard him as one of the major contemporary proponents of continuum morphology (or Fuzzy Arberian Morphology: FAM).

He developed a dynamic morphology or process morphology that supersedes the structure/process dualism inherent in almost all biological research. According to process morphology, structures do not have process(es), they are process(es). He used principal component analysis and the concept of morphological distance to provide a dynamic approach to structure as process, This approach has placed comparative morphology on a more objective plane.

Finally, he developed Articulation Morphology. It is based on the open growth of plants, which entails ramification leading to articulation: the formation of articles. In this way, the plant is understood as an articulated whole. In contrast to mainstream morphology and other morphological approaches, articulation does not depend on a morphological theory, hence it is empirical in the sense that it is based solely on the observation of open growth, ramification, and articulation. Furthermore, articulation morphology is dynamic because articles are conceived as process combinations, and it is all-inclusive and unifying because it applies to all plants, including algae, bryophytes and vascular plants.

The focus of his philosophical contributions to plant morphology and our understanding of reality has been on process philosophy, integral philosophy, holism, contextualism, perspectivism, and complementarity. Besides hierarchy (holarchy), he underlines the importance of complementary perspectives such as holism as undivided wholeness, Yin-Yang, continuum and network views. Besides Aristotelian either/or logic, he emphasizes the importance of fuzzy logic. He explores how either/or logic can lead to conflict and even war, whereas fuzzy logic and Yin-Yang thinking can be healing because they connect what either/or logic has torn apart. Finally, he also emphasizes that beyond all perspectives is the unnamable source, emptiness (in the Buddhist sense), mystery, which is of ultimate importance for healing and total Being.

== Awards and honors ==
Sattler is a Fellow of the Linnean Society of London and a Fellow of the Royal Society of Canada. In 1974, he was awarded the Lawson Medal (the highest award of the Canadian Botanical Association) for his book Organogenesis of Flowers.

In 1995, he received an honorary doctorate (D.Sc.) from the Open International University at Colombo, Sri Lanka for his contributions to complementary alternative medicine.

A symposium was dedicated to him on the occasion of his retirement.

== Selected publications ==
- Sattler, R. Wholeness, Fragmentation, and the Unnamable: Holism, Materialism, and Mysticism - A Mandala
- ---- 2026. Articulation morphology of plants and plant evo-devo: An open morphology - empirical, dynamic, all-inclusive, and unifying. Plants 15 (5), 730. Rolf Sattler (2026) Articulation morphology of plants and plant evo-devo: An open morphology - empirical, dynamic, all-inclusive, and unifying. Plants 15 (5), 730.
- ---- 2024. Feature Paper: Morpho evo-devo of the gynoecium: heterotopy, redefinition of the carpel, and a topographic approach. Plants 13(5), 599.
- ---- and Rutishauser. 2023. Feature Paper: Fundamentals of plant morphology and plant evo-devo (evolutionary developmental biology). Plants 12(1): 118-131.
- ---- 2021. Science and Beyond: Toward Greater Sanity through Science, Philosophy, Art, and Spirituality. FriesenPress.
- ---- 2019. Structural and dynamic approaches to the development and evolution of plant form. In: Fusco, G. (ed) Perspectives on Evolutionary and Developmental Biology. Essays for Alessandro Minelli. Chapter 6, pp. 57-70 ISBN 9788869381409
- ---- 2018. Philosophy of plant morphology. Elemente der Naturwissenschaft 108: 55-79
- ---- 2016. Science and mystery. Holistic Science Journal 3(1): 49-53.
- ---- 2012. Outgrowing Aristotle: How to move beyond the logic of either/or. Green Spirit 14(2): 18-20 (also available as Healing Thinking through both/and logic, Buddhist and Jain logic.
- ---- 2008. Wilber's AQAL Map and Beyond
- ---- 2001. Some comments on the morphological, scientific, philosophical and spiritual significance of Agnes Arber's life and work. Annals of Botany 88: 1215-1217.
- ---- 2001. Non-conventional medicines and holism. Holistic Science and Human Values 5: 1–15.
- ---- 1999. Divergence and convergence of sciences and spirituality: life science and spirituality. Holistic Science and Human Values 4: 41-48
- ---- 1998. On the origin of symmetry, branching and phyllotaxis in land plants. In: R.V. Jean and D. Barabé (eds) Symmetry in Plants. World Scientific, Singapore, pp. 775–793.
- Sattler, R. and Rutishauser, R. 1997. The fundamental relevance of plant morphology and morphogenesis to plant research. Annals of Botany 80: 571-582.
- Sattler, R. 1996. Classical morphology and continuum morphology: opposition and continuum. Annals of Botany 78: 577-581.
- ---- 1994. Homology, homeosis and process morphology in plants. In: B.K. Hall (ed). Homology: The hierarchical basis of comparative biology. Academic Press, pp. 423–475.
- ---- 1992. Process morphology: structural dynamics in development and evolution. Canadian Journal of Botany 70: 708-714.
- Sattler, R. and Jeune, B. 1992. Multivariate analysis confirms the continuum view of plant form. Annals of Botany 69: 249–262.
- Jeune, B. and Sattler, R. 1992. Multivariate analysis in process morphology. Journal of Theoretical Biology 156: 147–167.
- Sattler, R. 1988. Homeosis in plants (Special Paper). American Journal of Botany 75: 1606–1617.
- ---- 1986. Biophilosophy. Analytic and Holistic Perspectives. Heidelberg, New York: Springer.
- ---- (ed). 1982. Axioms and Principles of Plant Construction. The Hague: Martinus Nijhoff/Junk (also published as Vol. 31a of Acta Biotheoretica).
- ---- (ed). 1978. Theoretical Plant Morphology. The Hague: Leiden University Press.
- ---- 1974. A new approach to gynoecial morphology. Phytomorphology 24: 22–34.
- ---- 1973. Organogenesis of Flowers. A Photographic Text-Atlas. Toronto: Univ. of Toronto Press.
