= Facility Credit Guarantee Program =

Credit guarantee program

The Facility Credit Guarantee Program (FGP) is a Commodity Credit Corporation (CCC) credit guarantee program to encourage the construction or improvement of agriculture-related storage, processing, or handling facilities in emerging markets.

== Coverage ==
The CCC provides repayment guarantees 95% of the covered value of the project, and a portion of interest on a variable rate basis on loans of one to ten years. The longer-term goal of the FGP is to expand sales of U.S. agricultural commodities and products to emerging markets. The CCC agrees to pay exporters or their assignee (e.g., financial institution) in the event a foreign bank fails to make payment pursuant to the terms of an irrevocable letter of credit.
