= Evolution of seed size =

The first seeded plants emerged in the late Devonian 370 million years ago. Selection pressures shaping seed size stem from physical and biological sources including drought, predation, seedling-seedling competition, optimal dormancy depth, and dispersal.

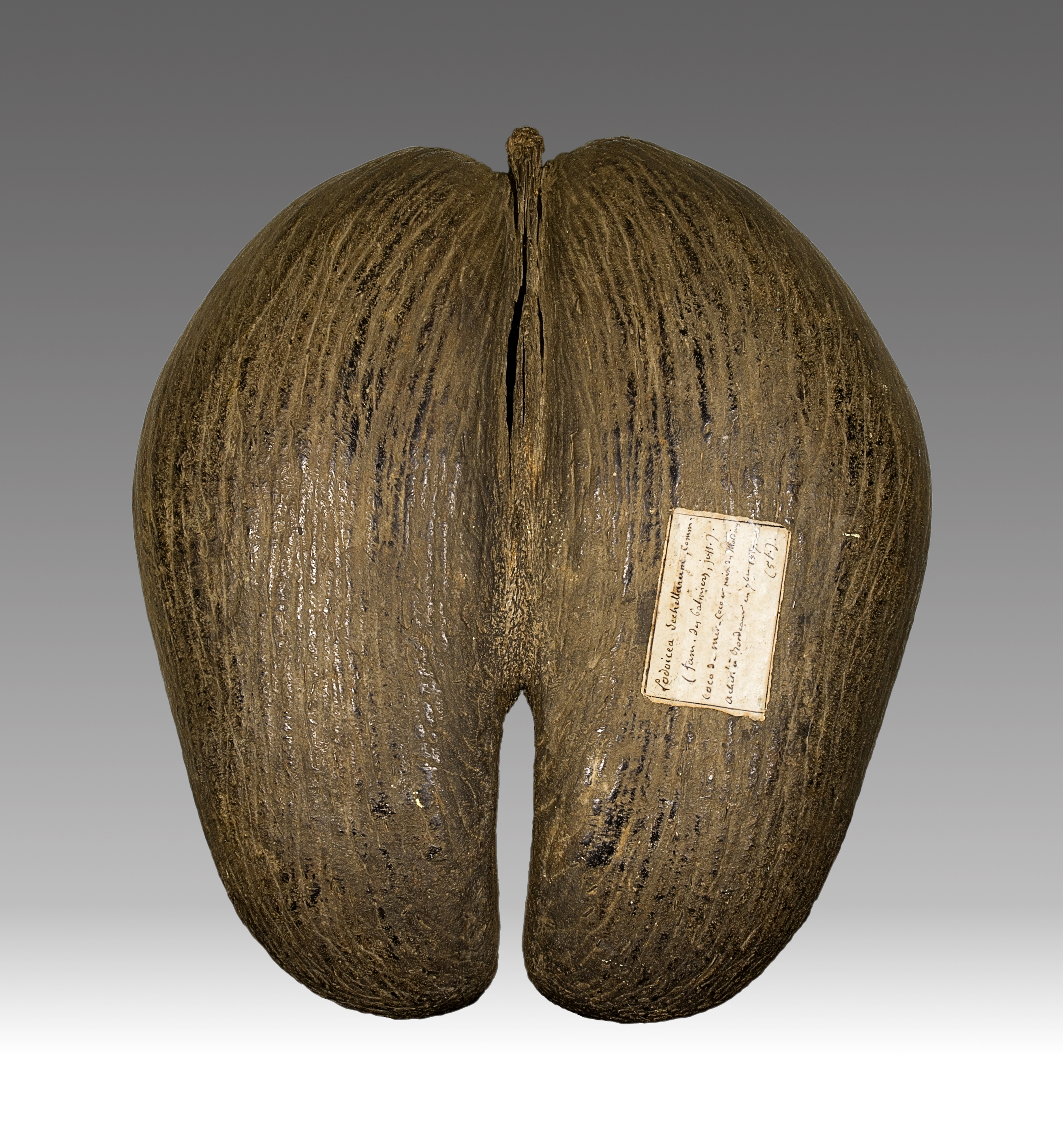
Double coconut -The world's largest known seed

== History ==
Since the evolution of the first seeded plants ~370 million years ago, the largest change in seed size was found to be at the divergence of gymnosperms and angiosperms ~325 million years ago, but overall, the divergence of seed size appears to take place relatively consistently through evolutionary time. Seed mass has been found to be phylogenetically conservative with most differences in mean seed mass within types of seed dispersal (dispersal modes) being phylogenetic. This type of information gives us clues about how seed size evolved. Dating fossilized seeds of various sizes and comparing them with the presence of possible animal dispersers and the environmental conditions of the time is another technique used to study the evolution of seed size. Environmental conditions appear to have had a larger influence on the evolution of seed size compared to the presence of animal dispersers. One example of seed size evolving to environmental conditions is thought to have been abundant, closed forest vegetation selecting for larger seed sizes during the Eocene epoch. A general increase or decrease in seed size through time has not been found, but instead a fluctuation in seed size following the environmental conditions of the Maastrichtian, Paleocene, Eocene, Oligocene, Miocene, and Pliocene epochs. Today we also see a pattern with seed size distribution and global environmental conditions where the largest mean seed size is found in tropical forests and a steep decrease in seed size takes places globally as vegetation type changes to non-forest.

== Mechanism ==
Modern seed sizes range from 0.0001 mg in orchid seeds to 42 kilograms (92 lb 10 oz) in double coconuts. Larger seeds have larger quantities of metabolic reserves in their embryo and endosperm available for the seedling than smaller seeds, and often aid establishment under low resource availability. However, smaller seeds can be produced in larger quantities which has the potential to produce more offspring and have better chances of some of the seeds dispersing into suitable habitat. This seed size-number trade off has led to the evolution of a wide range in size and number of seeds in response to environmental selection pressures.

== Selective pressures ==
No single event, such as a large divergence in the phylogeny of seeded plants, is seen as the cause of major divergences in seed size. Rather, small events are thought to occur fairly consistently through time with minor evolutionary influence.

=== Shade ===
Species growing in shaded environments tend to produce larger seeds and larger seeded species have higher seedling survivorship in low-light conditions. The increased metabolic reserves of larger seeds allows the first shoots to grow taller and leaves to grow broader more quickly in order to compete for what little sunlight is available. A few large seeded trees that occur in closed canopy wooded areas such as old-growth forests are the many oak species, hickory, pecan, and butternut trees.

=== Drought ===
Small seeds are seen to be predominant in arid, desert environments. In some desert systems the vast majority of annual seeds weigh between zero and two milligrams. small seed size may be a favorable adaptation in desert plants for a couple reasons. Small seeds have been found to have the ability to store in dry environments for several years without desiccating. Also, in many cases, deserts have rainy seasons that provide opportunity for small seeds to germinate under conditions with ample external resources available. Due to the great importance that seeds germinate when water is available, seeds often sense the presence of water and use it as a cue to germinate. Also, many desert plants have evolved the ability to produce a fraction of their seeds to not germinate at the same time as the rest of the plant's seeds as a safe guard known as bet hedging in which if the majority of a plant's seeds germinate at one time and then die due to rain followed by drought, the potential for the plant to have successful offspring is not completely lost.

=== Predation ===
Granivors (those that feed on seeds and grains) can selectively eat either smaller or larger seeds, favoring seeds on the opposite side of the spectrum. Commonly, granivorous predation by rodents, which selectively feed on larger seeds, leads to higher fitness of smaller seeds (e.g. kangaroo rats in desert systems selectively forage on the larger seeds in the seed bank. Similarly, sometimes smaller seeds are selectively preyed upon such as with Australian granivorous ants which are only capable of carrying smaller seeds.

=== Seedling-seedling competition ===
Competition between seedlings for limited resources can result selective pressures on seed size. In dense mats of competing seedlings, those from larger seeds have higher survivorship due to their ability to more quickly grow taller shoots, broader leaves, and thus out-compete smaller seeded seedlings for resources. Germinated seedlings from larger seeds could also possibly outlive the smaller seeded seedlings which cannot live as long off their stored energy reserves.

=== Optimal dormancy depth ===
If there is a selective pressure favoring the survival of seeds buried deeper in the soil, larger seed size may evolve because of their larger reserves of energy required to emerge from further depths. One such pressure causing this type of selection is the recurrence of fires (e.g. in prairies the heat from a fire can damage or kill seeds near the surface of the soil but leave seeds buried deeper unharmed).

=== Dispersal ===
The smaller the seed, the further they can disperse, which can be beneficial for avoiding competition with siblings and the parent as well as having better chances of some of the seeds dispersing into suitable habitat. Dispersal may also lead to greater fitness in future generations if further dispersed individuals are more likely to cross pollinate with an unrelated individuals, leading to greater genetic variation. The type of seed dispersal evolved has been highly correlated to seed size in floras across the world. In general, seeds smaller than 0.1 mg are often unassisted (wind dispersed), seeds larger than 100 mg are often dispersed by vertebrates or by water, and seeds between 0.1 and 100 mg are dispersed by a large variety of dispersal modes including dispersal by a great variety of animals.
