= Floral Genome Project =

Genetic sequencing for botanical research

- Formation: 2001
- Type: Academic Research
- Headquarters: Penn State University; University of Florida; Cornell University
- Location: United States
- Website: Official website

The Floral Genome Project is a collaborative research project primarily between Penn State University, University of Florida, and Cornell University. The initial funding came from a grant of $7.4 million from the National Science Foundation. The Floral Genome Project was initiated to bridge the genomic gap between the most broadly studied plant model systems. According to the website, the following are the aims of the project:

The Floral Genome Project will investigate the origin, conservation, and diversification of the genetic architecture of the flower, and develop conceptual and real tools for evolutionary functional genomics in plants.
