= Aleksander Szeligowski =

Polish musician

Background information
- Born: August 24, 1934; Wilno, Poland
- Died: May 4, 1993 (aged 58) Poznań, Poland
- Occupations: Composer, conductor, musician
- Instrument: Organ
- Years active: 1950–1987

Aleksander Robert Szeligowski (24 August 1934 – 4 May 1993) was a Polish composer, conductor, organist and pedagogue. He studied in Poznań and Warsaw, later working as assistant conductor for the Poznań Philharmonic. Son of Tadeusz Szeligowski, he is the author of numerous compositions for piano, female and mixed choirs and others.

== Life and work ==
Aleksander Szeligowski was born in Wilno, Poland, on 24 August 1934. He was initially educated in the class of Mariana Ochalskiego where he began playing organ, then at the State Music High School in Lublin. Later he began studying at the State School of Music in Poznań where he studied composition and organ, and at the Fryderyk Chopin University of Music in Warsaw, where he was a conducting student of Stanisław Wisłocki and Bohdan Wodiczko. He also studied composition under the guidance of his father, Tadeusz Szeligowski, graduating in 1959, and again in 1960 in the class of Joseph Pawlak. From 1964 to 1993 he worked at the National School of music in Poznań, where he lectured, among other disciplines, score reading, orchestration, composition and pedagogy of improvisation.

In the second half of the 1960s, he worked as assistant conductor for the Poznań Philharmonic, and conducted symphony concerts in Poznań, Lublin, Wrocław and Szczecin. In 1964 he became a member of the Polish Composers' Union, becoming one of the authorities of the Poznań branch of this organization, and between 1965 and 1975 he worked with the Polish Television Centre in Poznań. From 1971 he served as Treasurer for the Poznań branch of the Polish Composers' Union, ZKP (Zwiazek Kompozytorow Polskich), for several terms. He died in Poznań on 4 May 1993.

== Musical works ==
=== Stage works ===
- Sick cat, a fairy tale for children (1967)
- Mite, opera for Children in 3 Acts (1970)
- Kruszynka, opera for children (1970)
- Bird's streets, a fable (1977)

=== Vocal and instrumental works ===
- Allegro for cello and piano (1957)
- Little suite for two violins and viola (1957)
- Three psalms for choir, strings and percussion (1958)
- Cycle for organ trios (1960)
- Lament of Agadir. Poem No. 2 for strings and percussion (1960)
- I'm sitting at the threshold [version I], a song for choir a cappella (1960)
- I'm sitting at the threshold [version II], a song for mixed choir a cappella (1960)
- Stojała lipeńka, a song for mixed chorus a cappella (1960)
- Four Songs for Soprano and 17 Instruments (1962)
- Four Songs to Poems of [Zbigniew Herbert] for soprano and 17 instruments (1962)
- Three songs to words by Leopold Staff for soprano and instrumental ensemble (1963)
- Wanderer, a song for mixed choir a cappella (1964)
- Three psalms for choir, strings and percussion (1965)
- Missa brevis [version II] for flute and organ (1965)
- Six pièces for flute and organ (1967)
- Song of our university for mixed choir a cappella (1969)
- Humorous miniature for mixed choir a cappella (1970–71)
- Fugue for mixed choir a cappella (1971)
- Seven stars for mixed choir a cappella (1972–1973)
- Children's concerto in the Old Style for piano and orchestra (1973)
- Atokamala, a joke, for mixed choir a cappella (1974)
- With you, cycle songs to poems by Nikos Chadzinikolau for soprano and instrumental ensemble (1975–76)
- Three songs, to poems by Julian Tuwim for mixed choir and orchestra (1975–76)
- Dance preludes for mixed choir and percussion ad libitum (1976)
- Sketches for 2 oboes and bassoon (1976)
- Five proposals for 3 flutes and 2 vibes (1976)
- Cantilena and fugato for 5 accordions (1976)
- Seven songs for 2 and 3 voices a cappella, chorus girl (1977)
- Rock me to swing for 3 voices, children's choir and instrumental ensemble (1978)
- Sentences for 2 pianos (1978–79)
- The december bells for mixed choir a cappella (1978–79)
- Contrasts for alto and 7 instruments (1979)
- Musical variety for soloists, speaker, choir and orchestra (1979)
- Theme with variations for three female voices a cappella (1979)
- Kuma for 3 female voices a cappella (1979)
- The sea for mixed choir a cappella (1979)
- Three songs about Warsaw for various a cappella chorus (1979)
- Two Songs to Poems by Nikos Chadzinikolau for soprano and 7 instruments (1979–80)
- Humoresque for female choir a cappella (1980)
- Theme with variations for flute and strings (1981)
- Typewriter for children's choir and instrumental ensemble (1981)

=== Works for solo instruments and orchestra ===
- Concerto grosso for string orchestra (1950–1953)
- Poem No. 1 for string orchestra (1957)
- Concertino for piano and orchestra (1965)
- Scherzo for orchestra (1966)
- Concerto for bassoon and orchestra (1970)
- Concerto for flute and orchestra (1970–71)
- Waltz concerto for piano and orchestra (1971)
- Concerto for horn and orchestra (1973)
- Two cycles of works for young people for violin and orchestra (1976)
- Concerto for clarinet and orchestra (1979–80)
- The question mark for soloists, reciter, chorus and orchestra (1979–80)
- Small classical concerto for flute (or oboe) and instrumental ensemble (1981)
- Ad Patrem for string orchestra, (1987)

=== Chamber music ===
- A series of songs to words by Andrzej Partum for soprano and chamber orchestra (1961)
- Vocalise for soprano and chamber ensemble (1963)
- Suite for Flute Di 5 and String Quartet (1965)
- Miniatures for trombone and piano (1965)
- Miniatures for flute and piano (1965)
- Miniatures for piano (1966)
- Heroes of the Wielkopolska Uprising. Poem No. 3 for string orchestra (1966)
- Miniatures for string quartet (1967–68)
- Mythological Ode for flute and chamber orchestra (1968)
- Triple concerto for one performer on the oboe, English horn, oboe and strings (1969)
- Suite (children), for oboe and piano (1978–79)
- Wielkopolska Bride for small band (1979)
- Musica per otto for orchestra (1979)
- Solo e tutti for Strings (1979)
- Musica per archi (1979)
- Musica di camera for 8 instruments (1979)
- Two pieces for organ, sheet metal, percussion and strings (1980)
- Little suite Szamotulska for piano and instrumental ensemble (1981)
- Suite for string orchestra (1981)
- Two humorous for flute (or oboe), bassoon and chamber ensemble (1981)
- Miniatures for wind quintet and 2 percussion instruments (1987)

=== Instrumental solo pieces ===
- Four aphorisms for piano (1954–1955)
- Sonata for organ No. 1 (1955)
- Scherzo for organ (1956)
- Sonata for organ No. 2 (1957)
- Missa brevis [version] for solo organ (1959)
- For six for percussion (1976)
- Album with pictures for piano (1978–79)
- Three pieces for Piano (1979)
- Allegro for accordion (1980)
- A series of songs for children for piano for four hands (1980)
- Little Children Sonatinas for piano (1981)
- Variety of different sets for woodwind (1981)
- Impression for organ

== See also ==
- Classical music
- 20th-century classical music
