= Canonici =

Canonici is a surname. Notable people with the surname include:

- Aurelio Canonici (born 1965), Italian conductor and composer
- Luca Canonici (born 1960), Italian operatic tenor
