= Quo Vadis (Nowowiejski) =

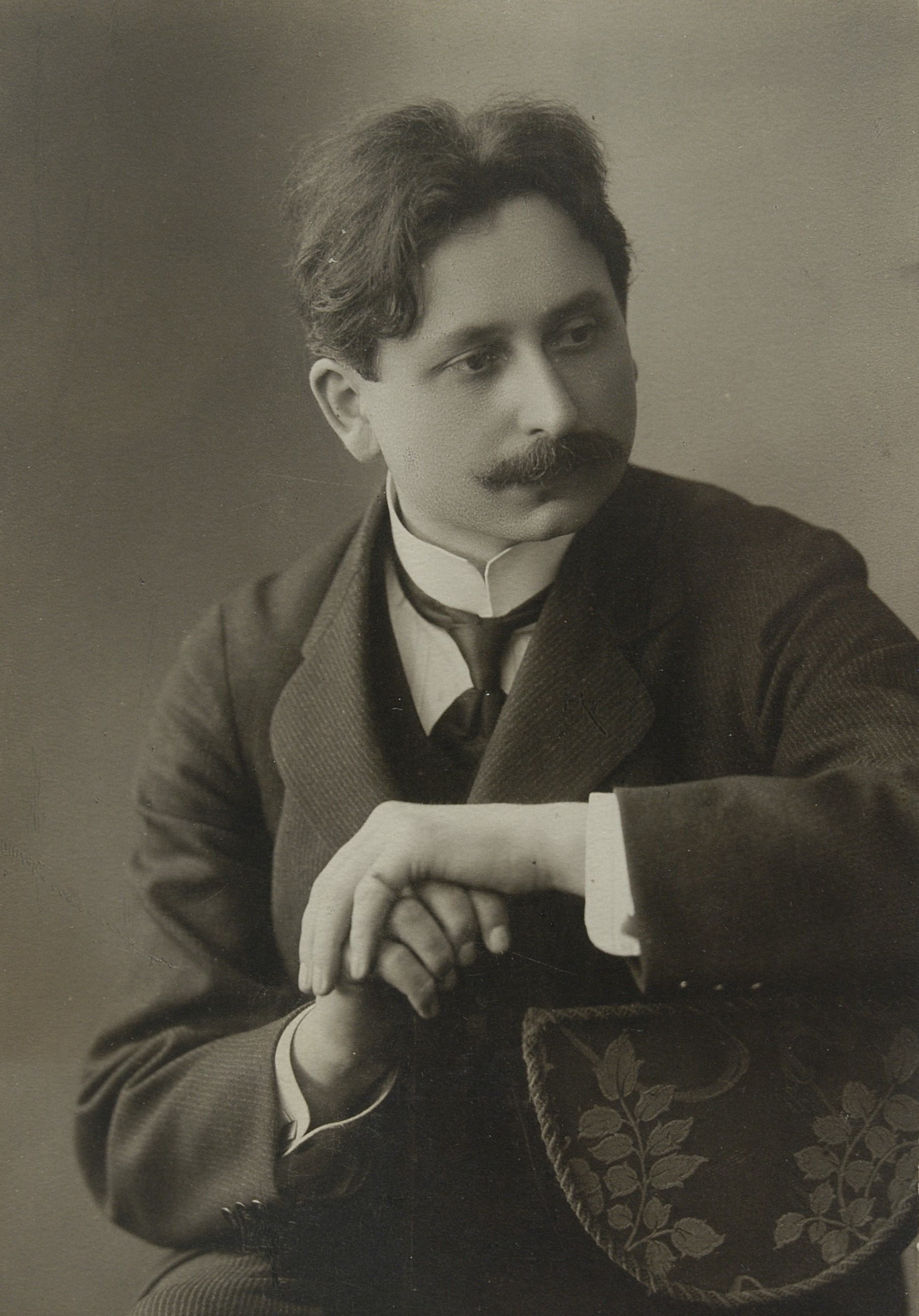
Feliks Nowowiejski

Quo Vadis Op.30, is a 1909 German-language oratorio by the Polish composer Feliks Nowowiejski drawn from the novel Quo Vadis by Henryk Sienkiewicz.

Written during the composer's studies with Max Bruch and Ernst Eduard Taubert in Berlin, it was premiered successfully in Amsterdam at the Concertgebouw in 1909, from where the work's reputation grew so that it was performed in more than 150 cities in Europe, and North and South America. It was performed at Carnegie Hall in New York, conducted by Nowowiejski himself, becoming the first Polish conductor to conduct in the hall's history.

In total it was performed over 200 times up until the outbreak of World War II in 1939. The Polish musicologist Wlodzimierz Poźniak wrote in 1960 that Nowowiejski's "Quo vadis" is the work which, from the entire Polish musical literature after Chopin, achieved the greatest international success. However the work was not performed outside Poland after the Second World War until a revival in Poznan and Berlin in June 2016 by the Poznan Philharmonic conducted by Łukasz Borowicz. The 2016 performances in Poznan were broadcast by Deutschland Radio Kultur, and released by CPO Records.

== Recordings ==
- Quo Vadis (sung in Polish) Opera Poznańska 1966, Dankowska, Fechner, Satanowski. Radio recording
- Quo Vadis (sung in Polish) Wioletta Chodowicz, Robert Gierlach Wojciech Gierlach Poznań Philharmonic Łukasz Borowicz CPO 2017
- Quo vadis (sung in German) Aleksandra Kurzak, Artur Ruciński and Rafał Siwek. Warmia and Mazury Philharmonic Orchestra, Piotr Sułkowski. Dux Records 2017
