= Wiesław Ochman =

Polish singer

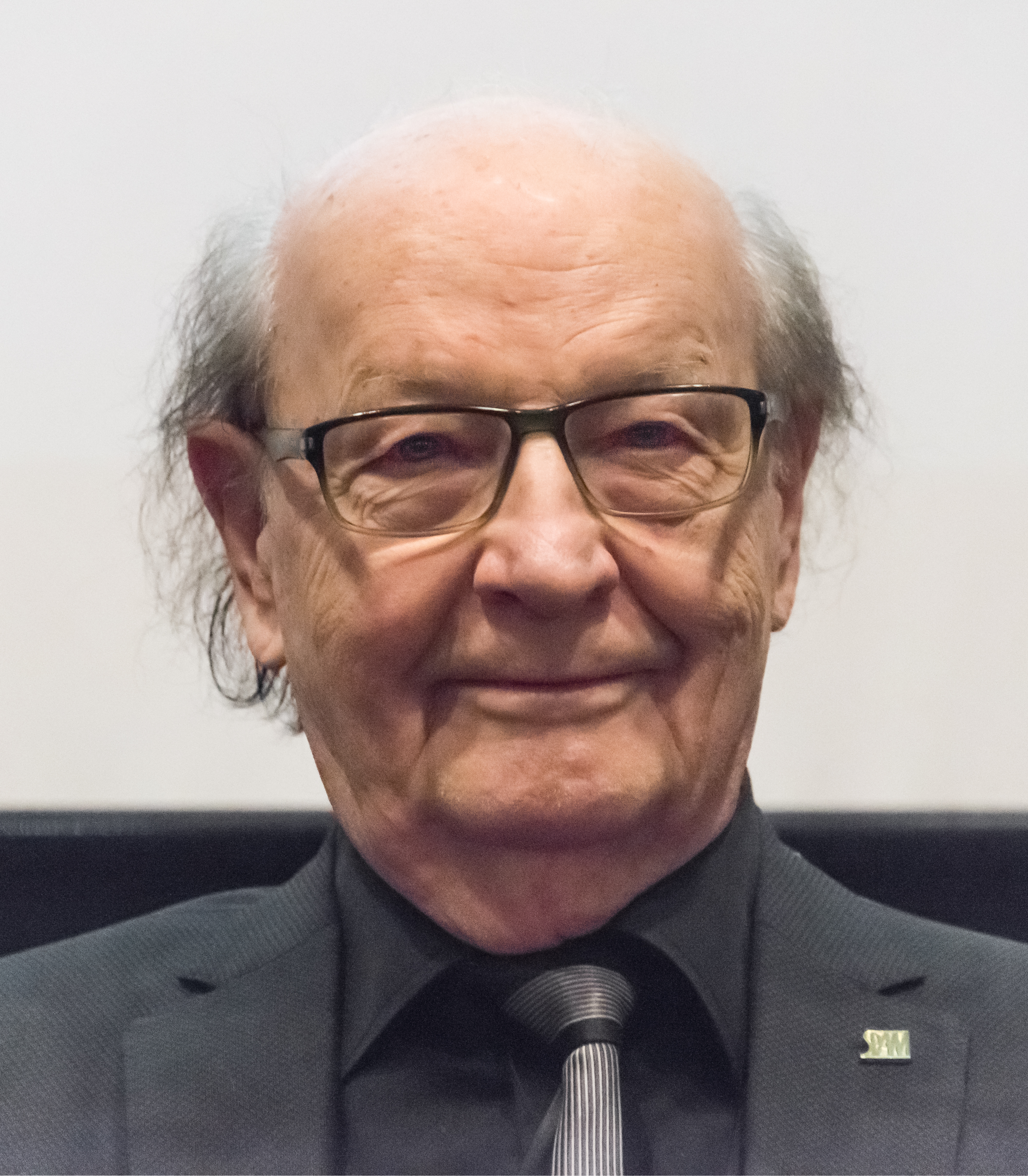
- Ochman in 2023
- Born: 6 February 1937 (age 89); Warsaw, Second Polish Republic
- Education: AGH University of Science and Technology
- Occupation: Opera singer (tenor)
- Years active: 1960–present
- Relatives: Krystian Ochman (grandson)
- Awards: Commander's Cross with Star of the Order of Polonia Restituta (2001); Gold Medal for Merit to Culture – Gloria Artis (2005)

Wiesław Ochman (Polish pronunciation: [ˈvjɛswaf ˈɔxman]; born 6 February 1937) is a Polish tenor.

== Life and career ==
In 1960, he graduated from the AGH University of Science and Technology in Kraków, Poland. Ochman began learning voice under the direction of Gustaw Serafin in Kraków (1955–1959) and Maria Szłapak in Bytom (1960–1963). In 1960, he joined the Silesian Opera in Bytom, where he sang for three seasons, in 1963 and 1964; and then, at the Opera Krakowska. He performed at the Teatr Wielki in Warsaw from 1964 till 1970. In 1965 he sang the tenor lead Jontek in the "national Polish opera" Halka by Stanisław Moniuszko in the opening performance in the reconstructed Teatr Wielki. He recorded that role and it is now available on compact disc.

Wiesław Ochman began his international career in 1967 with the Berlin State Opera. He sang in Munich and Hamburg. He achieved his first successes in competition at festivals in Glyndebourne and Salzburg. In 1972, he was engaged by the Paris Opera, and consecutively by operas in Chicago and San Francisco. He also performed in Milan's La Scala, Buenos Aires, Madrid, Moscow and Vienna. In 1975 with the role of Arrigo in the opera The Sicilian Vespers by Giuseppe Verdi, Ochman made his debut at New York's Metropolitan Opera.

Wiesław Ochman recorded 31 vinyl records, most of them in Poland.

In 1980, he was awarded the City of Kraków Award and in 1996 he received the Order of the Smile. In 2001, he was awarded by then President of Poland Aleksander Kwaśniewski the Commander's Cross with Star of the Order of Polonia Restituta for his outstanding achievements in the field of culture. In 2005, he became a recipient of the Gold Medal for Merit to Culture – Gloria Artis.

== Personal life ==
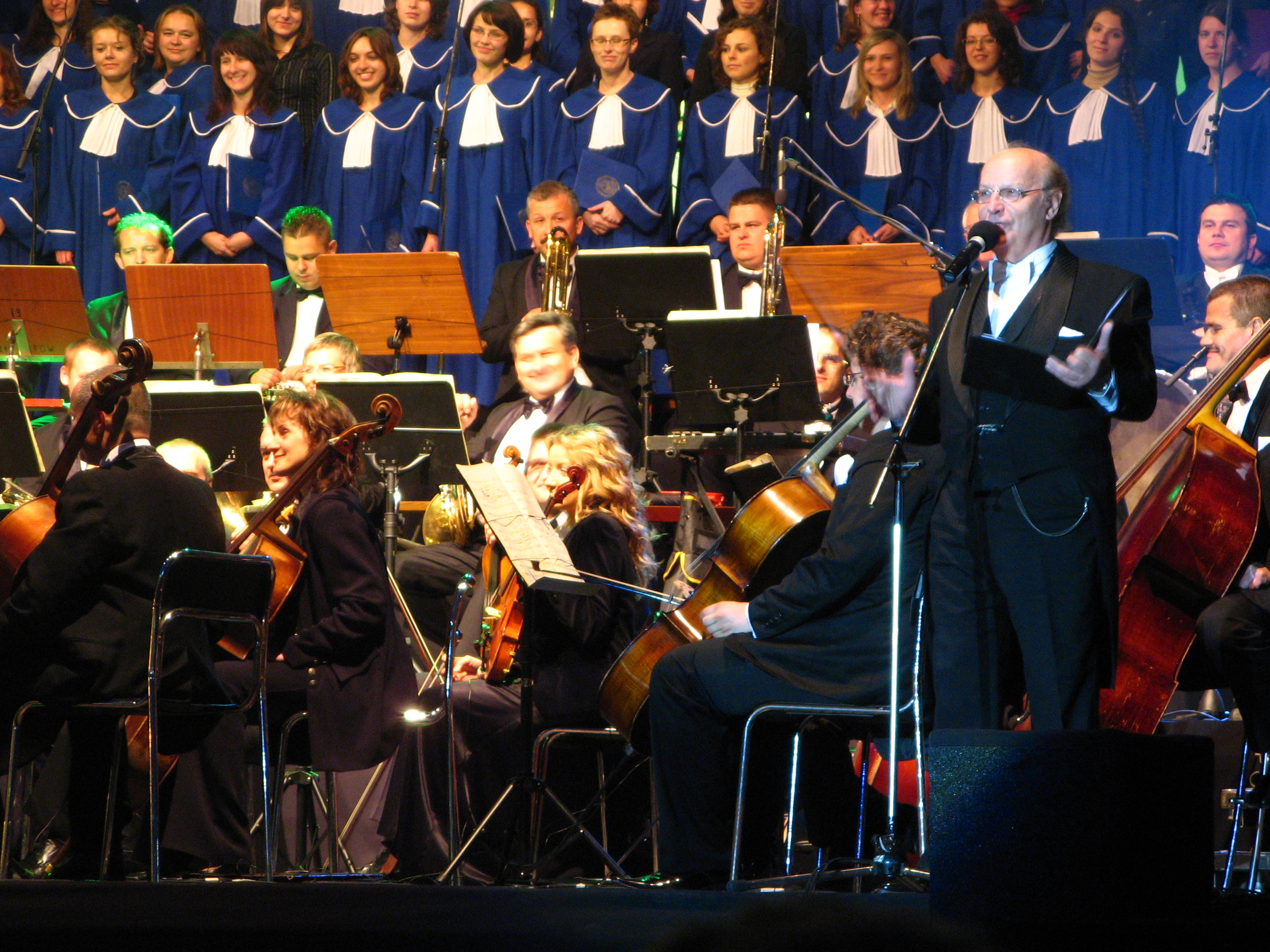
Ochman performing with the Lublin Medical Academy Choir in Zamość, 2008

He married his wife, Krystyna, in 1963. He is the grandfather of singer Krystian Ochman, the winner of the eleventh season of The Voice of Poland and the winner of Poland's national selection to represent the country at the Eurovision Song Contest 2022.

== Discography ==
- SX 0465 Wiesław Ochman Best Loved Operatic Arias
  - Giacomo Puccini: La bohème, Rodolfo's aria from Act I Che gelida manina
  - Giacomo Puccini: Tosca, Cavaradossi's aria from Act III E lucevan le stelle
  - Giuseppe Verdi: Aida, Radames's aria from Act I Se quel guerrier io fossi!... Celeste Aida
  - Pyotr Ilyich Tchaikovsky: Eugene Onegin, Lensky's aria from Act II Kuda, kuda
  - Giacomo Puccini: Turandot, Calaf's aria from Act III Nessun dorma
  - Władysław Żeleński: Janek, Janek's aria Gdy ślub weźmiesz z twoim Stachem
  - Friedrich von Flotow: Martha, Lyonel's aria from Act III M’appari
  - Georges Bizet: Les pêcheurs de perles, Nadir's aria from Act I Je crois entendre encore
  - Georges Bizet: Carmen, Don Jose's aria from Act II La fleur que tu m’avais jeteee
  - Giuseppe Verdi: Rigoletto, Duke's aria from Act III La donna è mobile
- SX 0972 Wiesław Ochman Polskie Arie Operowe
  - Stanisław Moniuszko: Halka, Dumka Jontka from Act IV Szumią Jodły
  - Stanisław Moniuszko: The Haunted Manor, Stefan's aria from Act III Cisza dokoła
  - Stanisław Moniuszko: Flis, Franek's aria Płyną tratwy po Wiśle
  - Feliks Nowowiejski: Legenda Bałtyku, Doman's aria from Act II Więc ty mnie nie kochasz
  - Ignacy Jan Paderewski: Manru, Manru's aria from Act II Jako gdy wśród skwaru
  - Roman Statkowski: Maria, Wacław's aria from Act I Och jak ciąży ta wesołość
  - Władysław Żeleński: Goplana, Kirkor's aria from Act I Za jaskółeczką ciągną moje oczy
  - Władysław Żeleński: Janek, Janek's aria Gdy ślub weźmiesz z twoim Stachem
- SX 1281 Wiesław Ochman Słynne arie operetkowe
- SX 1371 Wiesław Ochman Sławni polscy śpiewacy vol. 7
  - Wolfgang Amadeus Mozart: Don Giovanni, Don Ottavio's aria from Act II Il mio tesoro
  - Giacomo Puccini: Tosca, Cavaradossi's aria from Act I Recondita armonia
  - Amilcare Ponchielli: La Gioconda, Enzo's aria from Act II Cielo e mar!
  - Pietro Mascagni: Cavalleria rusticana, Turiddu's aria Mamma, quel vino e generoso
  - Giacomo Puccini: Manon Lescaut, Des Grieux's aria from Act I Donna non vidi mai
  - Umberto Giordano: Fedora, Loris's aria from Act II Amor ti vieta
  - Giacomo Puccini: La boheme, Rodolfo's aria from Act I Che gelida manina
  - Umberto Giordano: Andrea Chénier, Chenier's improvisation from Act I Un di all’azzurro spazio
  - Ruggero Leoncavallo: Pagliacci, Canio's aria from Act I Vesti la giubba
  - Giacomo Puccini: Madama Butterfly, Pinkerton's aria from Act III Addio, fiorito asil
  - Gaetano Donizetti: L'elisir d'amore, Nemorino's aria from Act II Una furtiva lagrima

== See also ==
- Music of Poland
