= Maklakiewicz =

Maklakiewicz is a Polish-language surname derived from the Russian word maklak (маклак), petty broker. It may refer to:

- Jan Maklakiewicz (1899–1954), Polish composer
- Tadeusz Wojciech Maklakiewicz (1922−1996), Polish composer
- Zdzisław Maklakiewicz (1927–1977), Polish actor

== See also ==
- Maklakov
