= Tadeusz Szeligowski =

Polish composer and educator (1896–1963)

- Born: 13 September 1896; Lemberg, Austria-Hungary
- Died: 10 January 1963 (aged 66); Poznań, Poland
- Resting place: Poznań Skalka crypt of Merit
- Occupations: Composer; educator; lawyer
- Employer: Państwowa Wyzsza Szkoła Muzyczna
- Notable work: The peacock and the girl; Sonata for flute and piano

Tadeusz Szeligowski (13 September 1896 – 10 January 1963) was a Polish composer, educator, lawyer and music organizer. His works include the operas The Rise of the Scholars, Krakatuk and Theodor Gentlemen, the ballets The Peacock and the Girl and Mazepa ballets, two violin concertos, chamber and choral works.

As a music teacher, Szeligowski was very well established in Vilnius, Lublin, Poznań and Warsaw. He was also a respected music writer who frequently wrote for journals and magazines specialized in music such as the Kurier Wileński, Tygodnik Wileński, Muzyka and the Kurier Poznański. His achievements include the creation of the Poznan´ Philharmonic, where he served as its first director between the years 1947–1949, and the founding of the Poznań Musical Spring, one of the most important festivals of contemporary music at the time.

== Life and work ==
=== Musical education ===
Tadeusz Szeligowski was born on 13 September 1896 in Lemberg, then in Austro-Hungarian Galicia and now in western Ukraine. Szeligowski's first music and piano teacher was his mother. Later he began studying music at the Conservatory of Music of the Polish Society in L'vov in the years 1910–1914, where he studied piano under the direction of Vilem Kurz, and then from 1918 to 1923 in Kraków, where he studied piano with H. Peters, and composition with Bolesław Wallek-Walewski. Szeligowski's further education included musicology with Zdzisław Jachimecki and law at the Jagiellonian University in Kraków, where he received his doctorate in 1922. There he found work as repetiteur at the Kraków Opera House, allowing him to become well acquainted with the opera repertoire.

He complemented his studies in music in the years 1929–1931 in Paris, where he met many composers of his time such as Sergei Prokofiev, George Enesco and Arthur Honegger. There he studied composition with Nadia Boulanger and orchestration with Paul Dukas. There he attended many concerts and intensely experienced the latest compositions by Darius Milhaud, Francis Poulenc, ballet productions of many famous companies, as well as highly acclaimed performances by Jascha Heifetz, Vladimir Horowitz, Arthur Rubinstein and Ignacy Jan Paderewski.

=== Musical career ===
In 1923 Szeligowski worked in Vilnius, Lithuania (then part of the Second Polish Republic), as lawyer and lecturer at the Conservatory of Music. There he met Karol Szymanowski and became a great admirer of his music. He also worked with a dramatic theatre called Reduta, composing music for many of its productions. Shortly after his return to Poland in 1931, he began teaching music in Poznań until 1939, and then moved to Lublin for a little while after World War II. From 1947 to 1962 he worked for The State Higher School Of Music (Państwowa Wyzsza Szkoła Muzyczna) in Poznań, and from 1947 to 1950 he became director of the National Opera Academy, when on his own initiative the Poznań Philharmonic was created. In addition, he was the initiator of the festival of contemporary music, the "Poznań Musical Spring", where modern music was then presented in all its glory, and one of the organizers of the H. Wieniawski International Violin Competition. From 1951 to 1962 Szeligowski worked in Warsaw, first for the faculty of the Fryderyk Chopin University of Music in Warsaw, and later as director of the Polish Society of Composers.

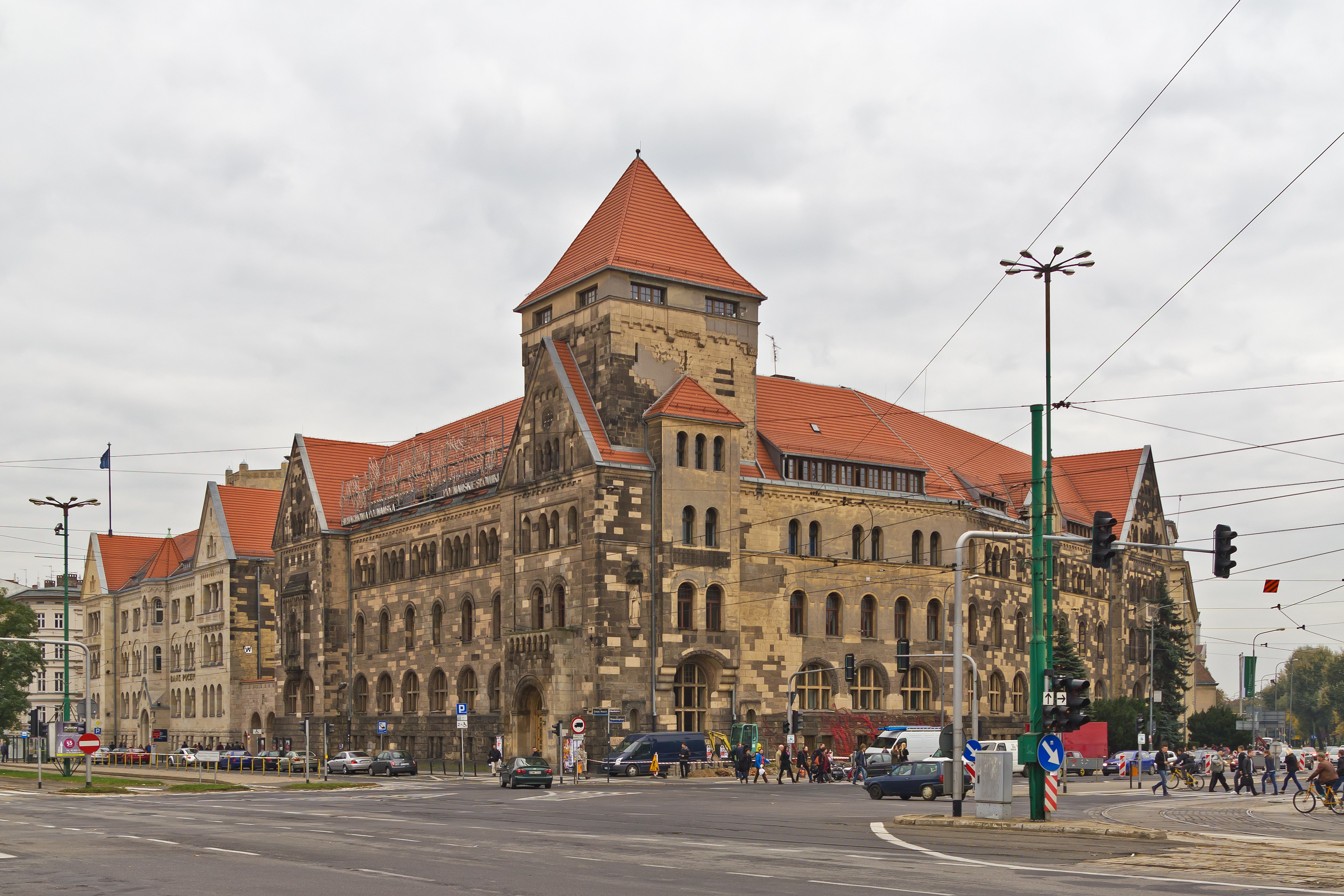
Poznań Philharmonic

A large group of his graduates on composition include: Zbigniew Bargielski, Augustyn Bloch, Joanna Bruzdowicz, Wojciech Lukaszewski, Tadeusz Wojciech Maklakiewicz, Boleslaw Ocias, Witold Rudzinski, Marek Sart, Janina Skowronska, Aleksander Szeligowski and Antoni Szuniewicz. See: List of music students by teacher: R to S#Tadeusz Szeligowski.

=== As a music writer ===
Lvov's musical scene at that time included a city opera, a symphonic orchestra, a music society and also a conservatory of music, and there Szeligowski was very active as a social organizer. Musicians such as Felix Weingartner and Oscar Nedbal usually visited the city and frequently performed works by Giuseppe Verdi and Richard Wagner. From 1951 to 1954 he served as chairman of the Polish Composers Union, and from 1953 he worked for the Board of Polish Music Publishers and the Central Pedagogical Office for Arts Education (COPSA). Tadeusz Szeligowski died in Poznań on 10 January 1963 and since 1965 he has been buried in the Poznań Skalka crypt of Merit.

== Awards ==
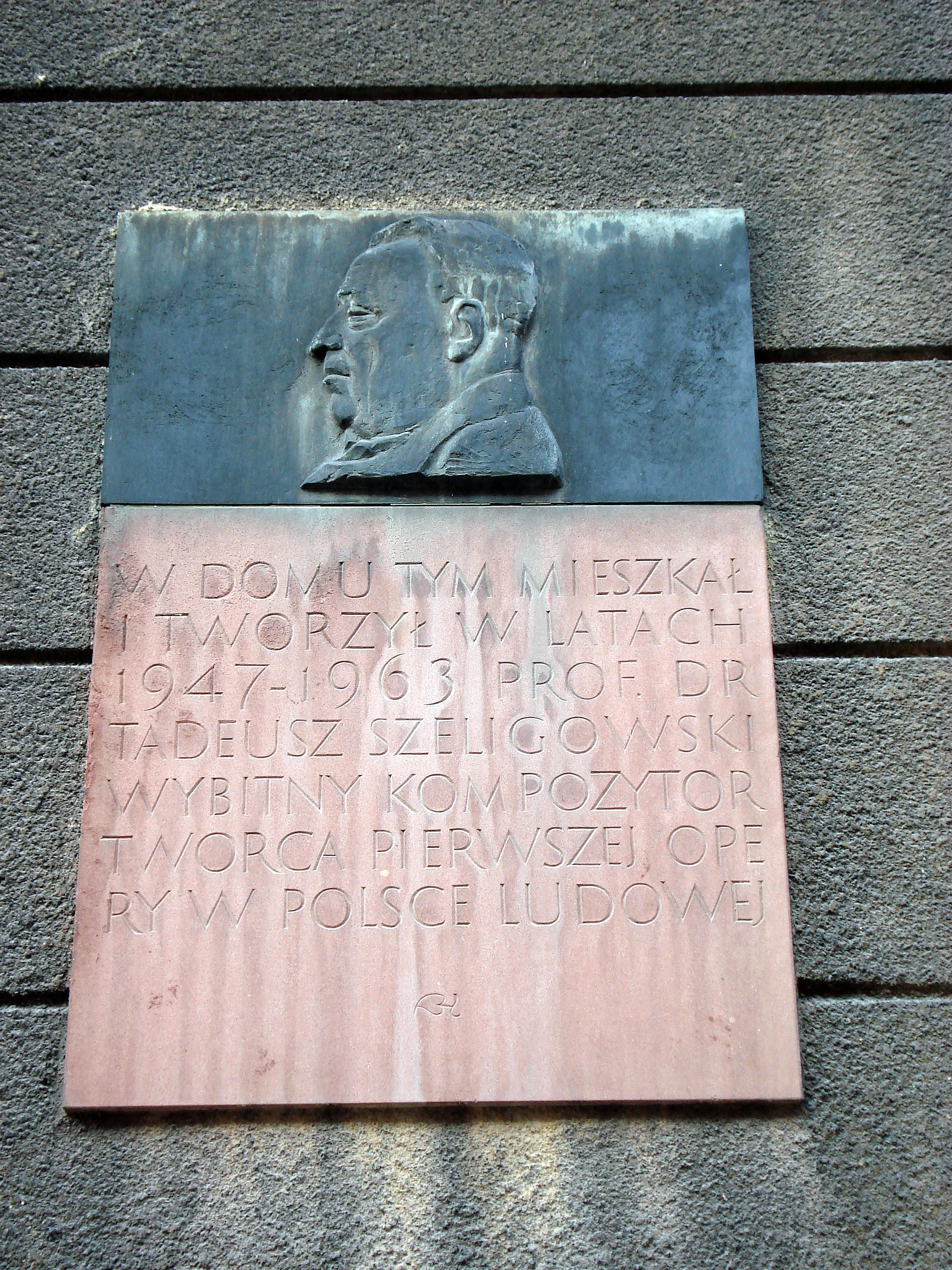
Józef Kopczyński's 1966 commemorative plaque for Polish composer Tadeusz Szeligowski.

Szeligowski received numerous awards, among them:

- 1949: Third prize at the Second Chopin Composition Competition for his Piano Sonata in D minor
- 1949: Second prize at the Polish Radio Competition for the song The Prince and the girl
- 1950: State prize of the second degree for The peacock and the girl, Arion, and the Lublin Wedding
- 1951: State prize of the first degree for the opera stage Rise of the scholars
- 1963: Prize Prime Minister of Poland for his music for children and youth
- 1963: Music Award of the PCU, awarded every 17 January by the Polish Composers' Union (ZKP — Zwiazek Kompozytorow Polskich) for lifetime achievement (posthumous)

Also, he received numerous prizes and awards, including:

- The City of Poznań Music Prize
- 1952: Gold Cross of Merit (ZŁOTYM KRZYZEM ZASŁUGI)
- 1952: Medal Order of Polonia Restituta
- 1966: A commemorative plaque designed by Józef Kopczyński and placed at House 22, Chełmoński street, in Poznań, where he lived from 1947.

== Compositions ==
=== Instrumental ===
==== Orchestral works ====
- The Peasant King - Overture to the comedy of Piotr Baryka for orchestra (1926)
- Kaziuki - St. Casimir's Day, suite for orchestra (1928–29)
- Concerto for Orchestra (1930)
- Archaic Suite for orchestra (1930)
- Little Suite for orchestra (1931)
- Clarinet Concerto (1933)
- Andante for clarinet and orchestra (1933)
- Blue Bird - suite for orchestra (1936)
- Epitaph on the death of Karol Szymanowski for string orchestra (1937)
- Carol Suite for string orchestra (1939)
- Piano Concerto (1941)
- Suite for small orchestra of Lublin (1945)
- Kupałowa night - suite for orchestra (1945)
- Nocturno for orchestra (1947)
- Comedy Overture for small symphony orchestra (1952)
- The peacock and girl ballet suite for orchestra (1953)
- Four Polish Dances for symphony orchestra (1954)

==== Chamber music ====
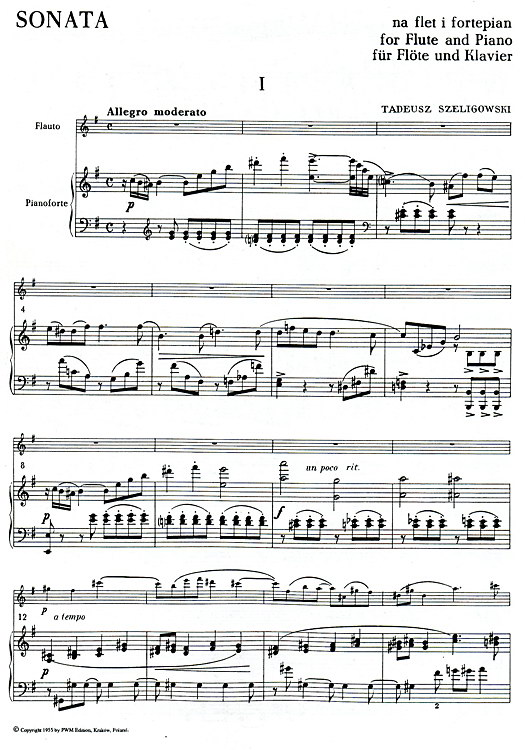
A musical score of Tadeusz Szeligowski's Sonata for flute and piano.

- Lithuanian Song for violin and piano (1928)
- String Quartet No. 1 (1928–29)
- Ricercar for 4 voices, instrumental or vocal (1931)
- String Quartet No. 2 (1934-1935)
- Trio for oboe, viola and cello (1935)
- Fish ball, song for children's team (1937)
- Air grave et gai air for English horn and piano (1940)
- Nocturno for cello and piano (1943)
- Dance for cello and piano (1943–45)
- Poem for cello and piano (1943–45)
- Pastorale for cello and organ (1943–45)
- Sarabande for cello and organ (1943–45)
- Orientale for Cello and Piano (1945)
- Quintet for wind instruments (1953)
- Sonata for flute and piano (1953)
- On the meadow, suite for 2 pianos (1955)
- Trio for violin, cello and piano (1955-1956)
- Polish love songs for recorders (1959)

==== Solos (Pianoforte) ====
- Variations on a folk song for piano (1927)
- Guitars of Zalamea, for piano (1938–39)
- Sonatina for piano (1940–41)
- Russian Dance, for piano (1942)
- Sonata in d minor for piano (1949)
- Two etudes on double sounds for piano (1952)
- Small pieces for piano (1952)
- Odds and ends for four hands, for piano (1952)

=== Vocal Score ===
==== For solo voices ====
- Nos qui sumus - motet for two male voices (1929)
- O vos omnes - motet for three female voices (1929)
- Timor et tremor - motet for contralto and tenor (1929)
- Missa de Angelis for 3 female voices (1942)
- Ave Maria for three female voices (1943 )
- Regina Coeli Laetare for 3 female voices (1943)
- Populations meus for 3 female voices (1943)
- Veni Creator for 3 female voices (1943)

==== For choir a cappella ====
- Two Belarusian songs for mixed choir (1930)
- Under the canopy of snow - Christmas carol for mixed choir (1933–34)
- Angela sang sweetly - motet for mixed choir (1934)
- Quail - Belarusian folk song for male choir (1934)
- Regina Coeli Laetare for mixed choir (1934)
- Already we have time for male choir (1935)
- Song of the sailors, for mixed choir (1938)
- Psalm Joyful in memoriam of Guillaume Dufay for mixed choir (1938)
- Mass for choir (1942)
- Stabat Mater for mixed choir (1943)
- Pange lingua in mixed choir (1943)
- Five folk songs from Lublin region for choir female or child (1945)
- Five folk songs from the Lublin region for 3 mixed choir (1945)
- Four wedding songs from the Lublin region for mixed choir (1945)
- Koszalka - Opałka, scherzo for male choir (1946)
- A wyjrzyjcież, youths, song for mixed choir (1948)
- Song of the 10th anniversary [version II] for mixed choir a cappella (1955)
- Psalm CXVI "Laudate Dominum" for mixed choir and boys' (1960)

=== Vocal and instrumental ===
==== For voice and piano ====
- Wanda, song for voice and piano (1927)
- Lithuanian folk songs for voice and piano (1927)
- Song of the green for voice and piano (1929)
- Lilies - ballad for voice and piano (1929)
- Oaks - elegy for voice and piano (1929)
- In alder - idyll for voice and piano (1929)
- Hops - wedding song for voice and piano (1929)
- Floral allegories for voice and piano (1934)
- Songs to the words of Jarosław Iwaszkiewicz for voice and piano (1945)
- Green brzózko, song for voice and piano (1947)
- My Girl, song for voice and piano (1947)
- The Rose Highway, song for voice and piano (1947)
- Arion for tenor and piano (1949)
- Demon for tenor and piano (1949)
- Doves for soprano and piano (1949)
- The Ballad of Kostka Napierski for voice and piano (1951)
- With three Mauretankach, song for voice and piano (1953)
- Soledad for voice and piano (1960)

==== For various vocal and instrumental ensembles ====
- Psalm XVI - oratorio (1931)
- Latin Mass for mixed choir and organ (1932)
- Cherry Blues for voice, cello and piano (1934)
- Ave Maria for soprano, female choir and organ (1943)
- Aria for soprano and organ (1943)
- Sit down everybody around us, suite 12 popular songs from the years 1810 to 1875 for mixed choir (or soprano and alto) and piano (1945)
- Triptych for soprano and orchestra (1946)
- Cantata for sport "100 m" for solo voice, choir and orchestra (1948)
- Wedding Suite for soprano, tenor, female chorus, mixed chorus and piano (1948)
- Wedding in Lublin for soprano, mixed choir and small orchestra (1948)
- The young master and a girl, musical dialogue for soprano, baritone, mixed choir and orchestra or piano (1948-1949)
- Rhapsody for soprano and orchestra (1949)
- Of hearts card, cantata for soprano, mixed choir and symphony orchestra (1952)
- Sophie, suite for choir and orchestra (1952)
- Renegade, ballad for bass and orchestra or piano (1953)
- Song of the 10th anniversary [version] for choir

=== Stage works ===
- The peacock and the girl, ballet in 3 acts (1948)
- Bunt żaków (Student Rebellion), opera in 4 acts (1951)
- Krakatuk, opera in 3 acts with a prologue (1954)
- Mazepa, ballet in 3 acts (1958)
- Theodore Gentleman, opera in 2 acts ( 1960)

== See also ==
- Classical music
- Modern music
- Romantic composers
- Neoclassicism

== Selected bibliography ==
1. Zofia, Lissa; Rise of scholars, Tadeusz Szeligowski, PWM, Kraków 1957
2. Rozmowy "Movement Music". Says Tadeusz Szeligowski, Movement Music 1959
3. Podhajski, Marek; Tadeusz Szeligowski: counterpoint studies with Nadia Boulanger, Res Fact No. 8, PWM, Kraków 1977
4. Szantruczek, Tadeusz; Compose... and die. The thing about Tadeusz Szeligowski, Ars Nova, Poznan 1997
5. Szeligowski, Tadeusz; (biography), in: Encyclopedia of Music, ed. by A. Chodkowski, OWN, Warsaw 2001, p. 866
6. Szeligowski, Tadeusz; (biography), in: M. Hanuszewska B. Schaeffer, Polish Almanac of contemporary composers, PWM, Kraków 1982, p. 263-265
7. Szeligowski, Tadeusz; Studies and Memories, edited by F. Wozniak, Pomerania, Bydgoszcz 1987
8. Szeligowski, Tadeusz; Around the author and his works, ed. by T. Brodniewicz, J. Kempinski, J. Tatar, Ars Nova, Poznan 1998
9. Szeligowski, Tadeusz; The 10th anniversary of the composer's death, the materials of the scientific session, Academy of Music, Gdańsk 1973
