= Kraków Operahouse =

Opera house in Krakow, Poland

Opera Krakowska
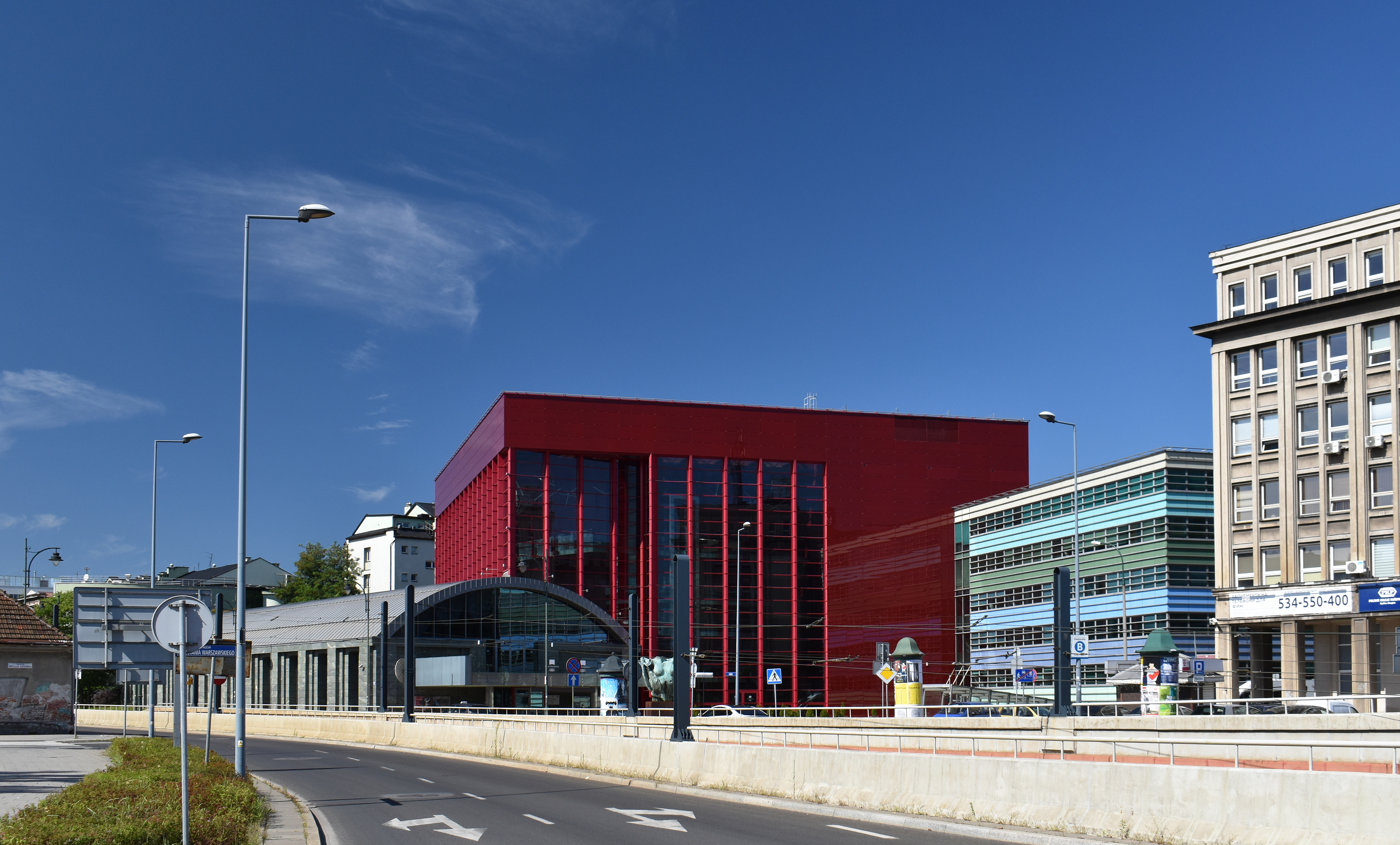
- New House of the Kraków Opera
- Interactive map of Opera Krakowska
- Address: 48 Lubicz Street; Kraków; Poland
- Coordinates: 50.065996°N 19.956220°E
- Capacity: 760
- Type: Opera House

Construction
- Opened: 1954 (2008, at this location)
- Architect: Romuald Loegler

Website
- Official website

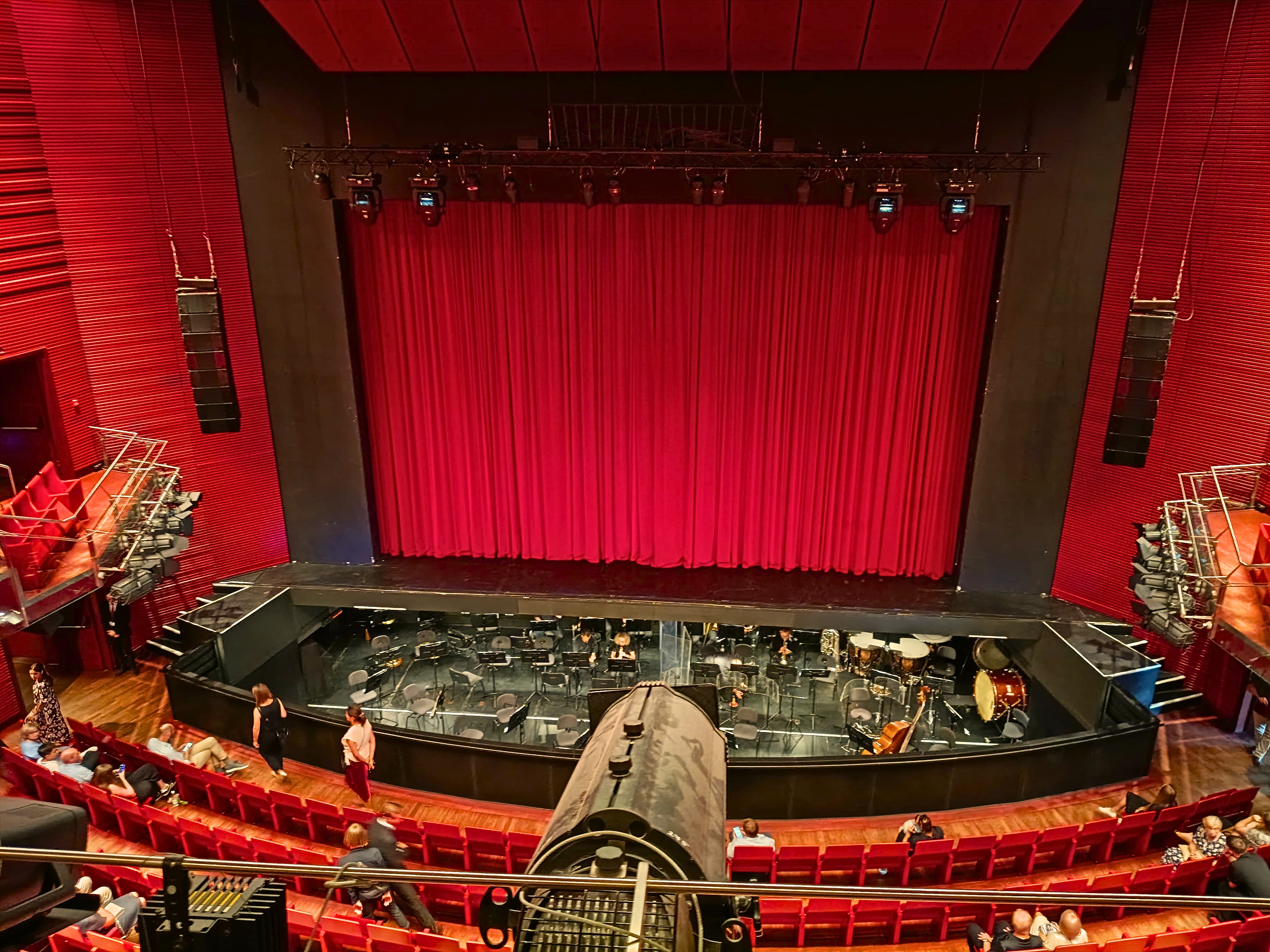

The Opera Krakowska (also known as the Kraków Opera) is an opera house located in Kraków, Poland. It was founded in 1954 in postwar Kraków, although the tradition of opera in the city dates back to 1628 when the first ever full libretto in Polish was released by the local publishing house, followed by the first fully-fledged opera performance in the city in March 1782. The Kraków Opera company stages 200 performances each year, including ballet, operettas and musicals for the young, with an audience occupancy rate of 98%. The Kraków Opera's main repertoire includes both international and Polish operatic classics, reaffirming its status as one of the country's leading opera companies.

The long list of names of renowned artists associated with it includes conductors such as Kazimierz Kord, Robert Satanowski, Jan Latham-Koenig, Roland Bader and Aurelio Canonici; set designers such as Tadeusz Kantor, Lidia Zamkow, Józef Szajna, Krystyna Zachwatowicz; and a plethora of opera singers, many of whom began their careers there, including Teresa Żylis-Gara, Wiesław Ochman, and Mariusz Kwiecień.

== The new venue ==
For dozens of years, the Kraków Opera, now located at Lubicz 48 Street, lacked its own premises and instead used a number of concert venues in the city. The only permanent stage where the opera performances were staged for decades was the landmark Juliusz Słowacki Theatre in Kraków Old Town. The construction of the new opera house which can seat 760 people started in 2004. The new house opened in the autumn of 2008.

The building of the new opera house was more expensive than originally thought. The ensuing dispute between the designer and the contractor who requested additional funds lasted for over two years. Among the reasons offered were the curtain walls for the office complex next door as well as the structural protection of other neighboring buildings. Romuald Loegler, designer of the opera, wrote letters attesting to his disagreement with the general contractor – Hochtief company Poland – whose director refused to talk to the media sending questions to general manager of the company, Piotr Rozkruta. The dispute reached the Department of Education and Culture in Kraków's city government until a special consultant was appointed by the province. The building costs rose about 10%; however, the financing of the project was never in danger, as explained by Krzysztof Markiel, the head of the department. In 2009 the new venue was awarded the Archa-Szopa 2009, an anti-award of Gazeta Wyborcza, as the worst new building in Kraków.

== Cultural significance ==
Long before the new opera house was unveiled, the Kraków Opera utilized historical interiors and landmark architecture in Kraków, as well as other cities, for staging its own performances. Groundbreaking productions in natural settings included the Straszny Dwór opera performance at the Renaissance Courtyard of the Niepołomice Castle in 2002 and 2003; Madama Butterfly was staged in the depths of the centuries-old Wieliczka Salt Mine in 2003, while Tosca by Giacomo Puccini and The Haunted Manor by Stanisław Moniuszko were performed against the arresting background of the Wawel Castle in 2005. The open-air performances included Halka, offered at the Zakrzówek Nature Park in 2004; it was recognized by the some critics as the most important event of the entire season. More than five thousand people saw that opera. In the summertime, the Kraków Opera also used the open-air stage at the Kraków Barbican. The visual significance of the location enriched the impact of operatic music not only for the regular patrons, but also for the numerous tourists.

World famous soloists have visited the Kraków Opera's stage, including singers from the Metropolitan Opera in New York City and La Scala in Milan. A number of noted Polish singers also performed there. The company's performers travel abroad every year to participate in special events and festivals in the Netherlands, Germany, France, Italy, Switzerland, England, United States and as far as Chile.
