= Stanisław Wisłocki =

Polish conductor (1921–1998)

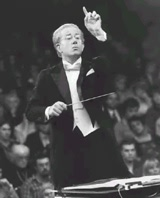

Stanisław Wisłocki (7 July 1921 – 31 May 1998) was a Polish conductor of classical music who performed and recorded with many internationally renowned orchestras, ensembles and virtuoso musicians and is highly regarded for his interpretations of Beethoven, Mozart, Prokofiev, Rachmaninoff, Schumann and Tchaikovsky.

== Early life ==
Wisłocki was born in Rzeszów, Poland. He began his studies in Lwów [Lviv] under Seweryn Barbag, and continued during the war at the Academy of Music in Timișoara and Bucharest under George Simonis (composition and conducting), Emil Mikhail (piano), and George Enescu. It was during this time that he began his artistic career, performing as a pianist and conductor in Romania.

== Career ==
After returning to Poland in 1945, Wisłocki founded the chamber orchestra "Polish Society for the Promotion of Folk Music". Two years later he started the Poznan Philharmonic Orchestra, where he was artistic director and conductor for 11 years. From 1961 to 1967 he was conductor of the Warsaw Philharmonic Orchestra.

From 1978 to 1981 he was director and artistic director of National Symphony Orchestra of Radio and Television in Katowice. During this period he performed in Europe, the United States, Canada, South America and Japan. In the years 1984–1990 he was chairman of the music section of the National Council of Culture, in 1987 vice-chairman of the Music Council of the Ministry of Culture and Art, member of the Music Section of the Council of Higher Artistic Education and chairman of the Council of the Polish Culture Foundation. In 1997, he became an honorary member of the Polish Composers' Union.

At the turn of the 1990s he was appointed music director of the National Philharmonic Orchestra of Venezuela.

== Academic career ==
From 1948 he conducted teaching activities. He was a lecturer at the State Opera School in Poznań (1948–1951), and at the State Higher Opera School in Poznań he lectured on score reading and conducting (1951–1957). From 1955, he also taught conducting at the State Higher School of Music in Warsaw, where in 1958 he became the head of the Conducting Department, initially as an associate professor, and later as an associate professor (1966) and full professor (1976).

Among his students were Tomasz Bugaj, Zbigniew Graca, Jacek Kaspszyk, Simon Kawalla, Wojciech Michniewski, Andrew Straszynski, Rubén Silva, Juan Carlos Núñez and Henryk Wojnarowski. A few of the notable soloists that he performed with were Sviatoslav Richter, Roman Totenberg and Ivry Gitlis. He retired in 1991, but continued to work at the university until March 1997.

== Awards ==
Stanisław Wisłocki was awarded many prestigious awards, including the Grand Prix du Disque, Académie Charles Cros in Paris (for "Piano Concerto" by Sergey Rachmaninoff with Sviatoslav Richter and the National Philharmonic Orchestra), the Minister of Culture and Art Prize of the Polish Composers Union and numerous Polish and foreign decorations.

== Film work ==
- Trzy kroki po ziemi - 1965
- Dziadek do orzechów - 1967
- The Deluge - 1974
- The Conductor - 1980
- The Polish Bride - 1998

Cultural offices
Preceded by Jerzy Maksymiuk	Music Director, Polish National Radio Symphony Orchestra; 1977–1981	Succeeded by Antoni Wit
