= Antoni Szuniewicz =

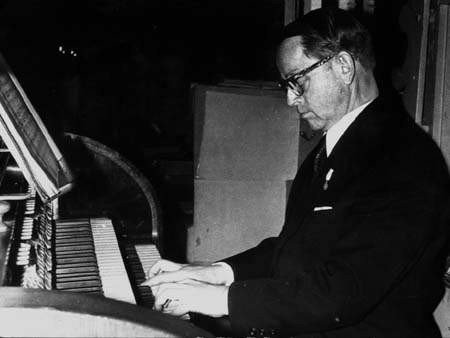

Background information
- Born: 14 November 1911; Leonowicze near Wilno, Poland
- Died: 12 March 1987 (aged 75) Częstochowa, Poland
- Occupations: Organist, composer, conductor, choirmaster, music teacher
- Instrument: Pipe Organ

Antoni Szuniewicz (14 November 1911 in Leonowicze near Wilno - 12 March 1987 in Częstochowa) was a Polish organist, composer, conductor, choirmaster and music teacher. In the years 1927 to 1931 he attended the School of Professional Organists in Montwiłła, Vilnius, then he studied at the Vilnius Conservatory of Music with Mieczysław Karłowicz, in the class of Wladyslaw Kalinowski (1932-1934), and also composition with Tadeusz Szeligowski from 1934-1939.
