= Butryny =

- Village
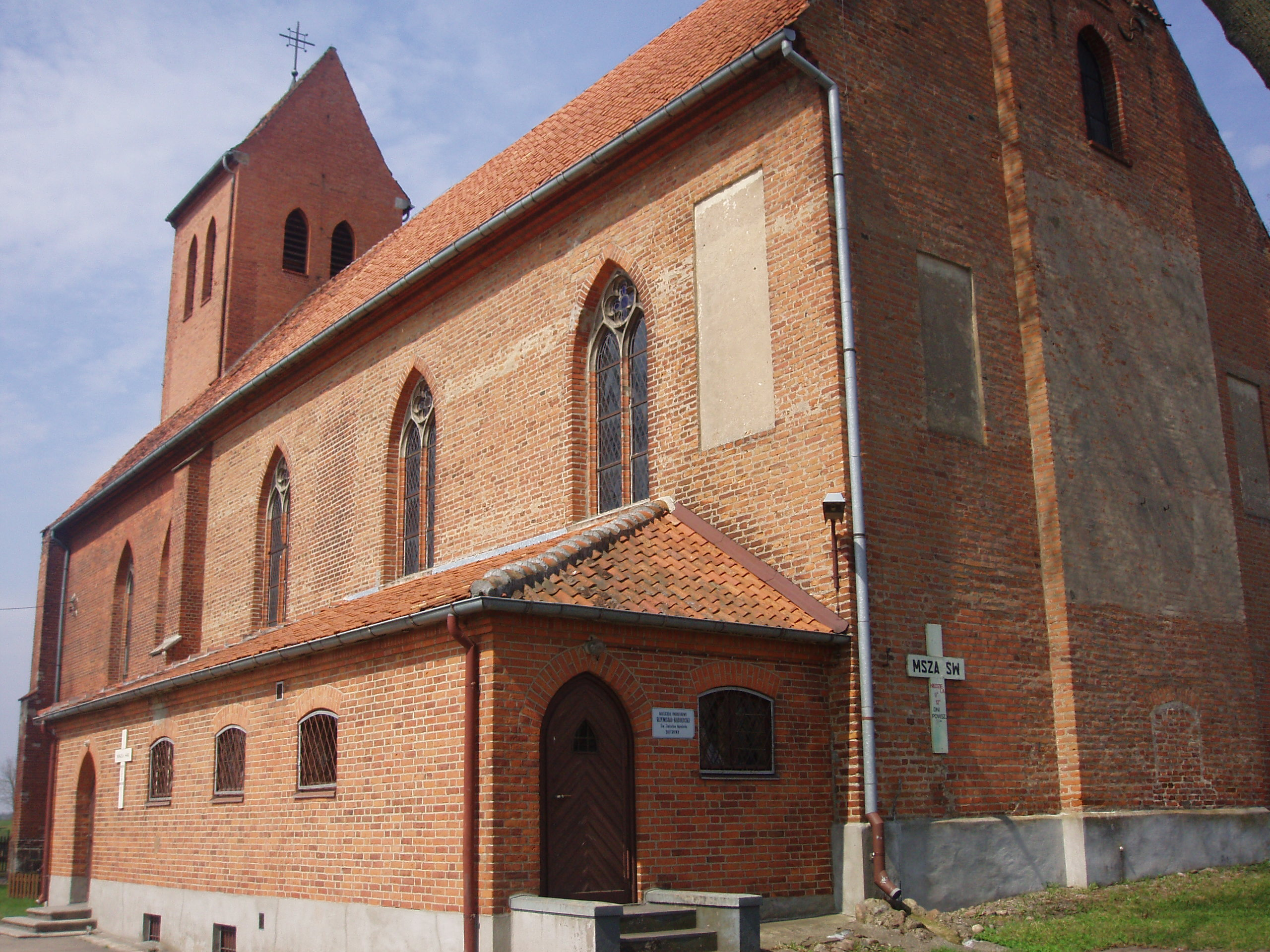
- Saint James' church

- Location within Poland
- Coordinates: 53°36′21″N 20°34′58″E
- Country: Poland
- Voivodeship: Warmian-Masurian
- County: Olsztyn
- Gmina: Purda
- Founded: 1412
- Elevation: 153 m (502 ft)
- Population: 580
- Time zone: UTC+1 (CET)
  - Summer (DST): UTC+2 (CEST)
- Postal code: 10-687
- Area code: +48 89
- Vehicle registration: NOL

Butryny [buˈtrɨnɨ] is a village in the administrative district of Gmina Purda, within Olsztyn County, Warmian-Masurian Voivodeship, in northern Poland. It is located within the historic region of Warmia

== Sights ==
The historic sights of Butryny include the Saint James' church, dating back to the 17th century, typical Warmian old wayside shrines and a Catholic cemetery.

== History ==
The village was founded in 1412. Polish poet and bishop Ignacy Krasicki visited Butryny in 1767 and 1779.

It was annexed by Prussia in the First Partition of Poland in 1772. The population was subjected to Germanisation policies. In 1861, all residents had indicated that they spoke Polish. In 1905, of 784 residents, only 8 indicated Polish as mother tongue, 100 spoke German, and most indicated Masurian dialect of Polish.

== Notable people ==
- Jan Niemierski (1886–1941), Polish officer, activist and mayor of Rzeszów, who died in the German Auschwitz concentration camp
- Katarzyna Nowowiejska née Falk, mother of Polish composer Feliks Nowowiejski

== Gallery ==
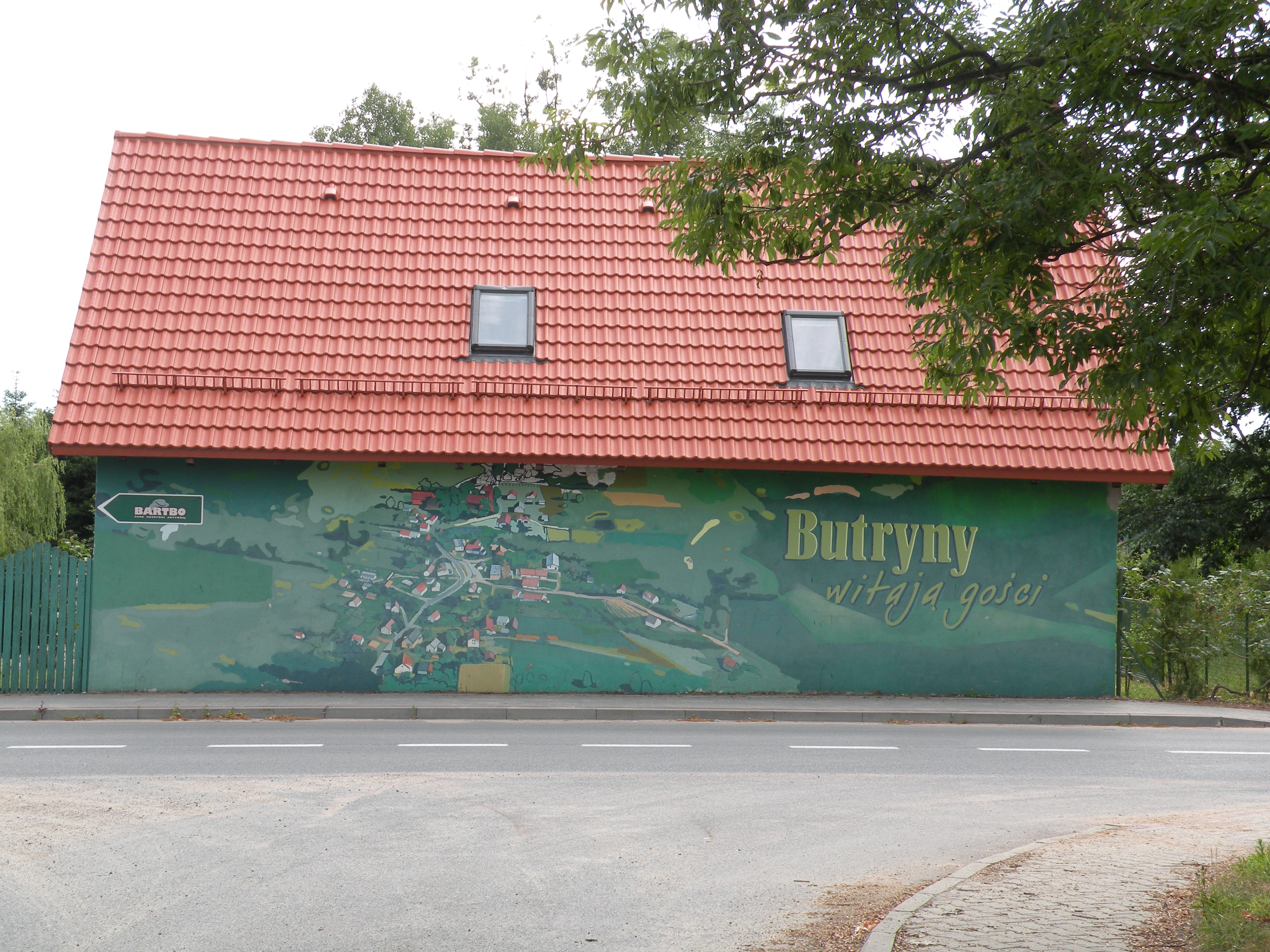
Mural in the village

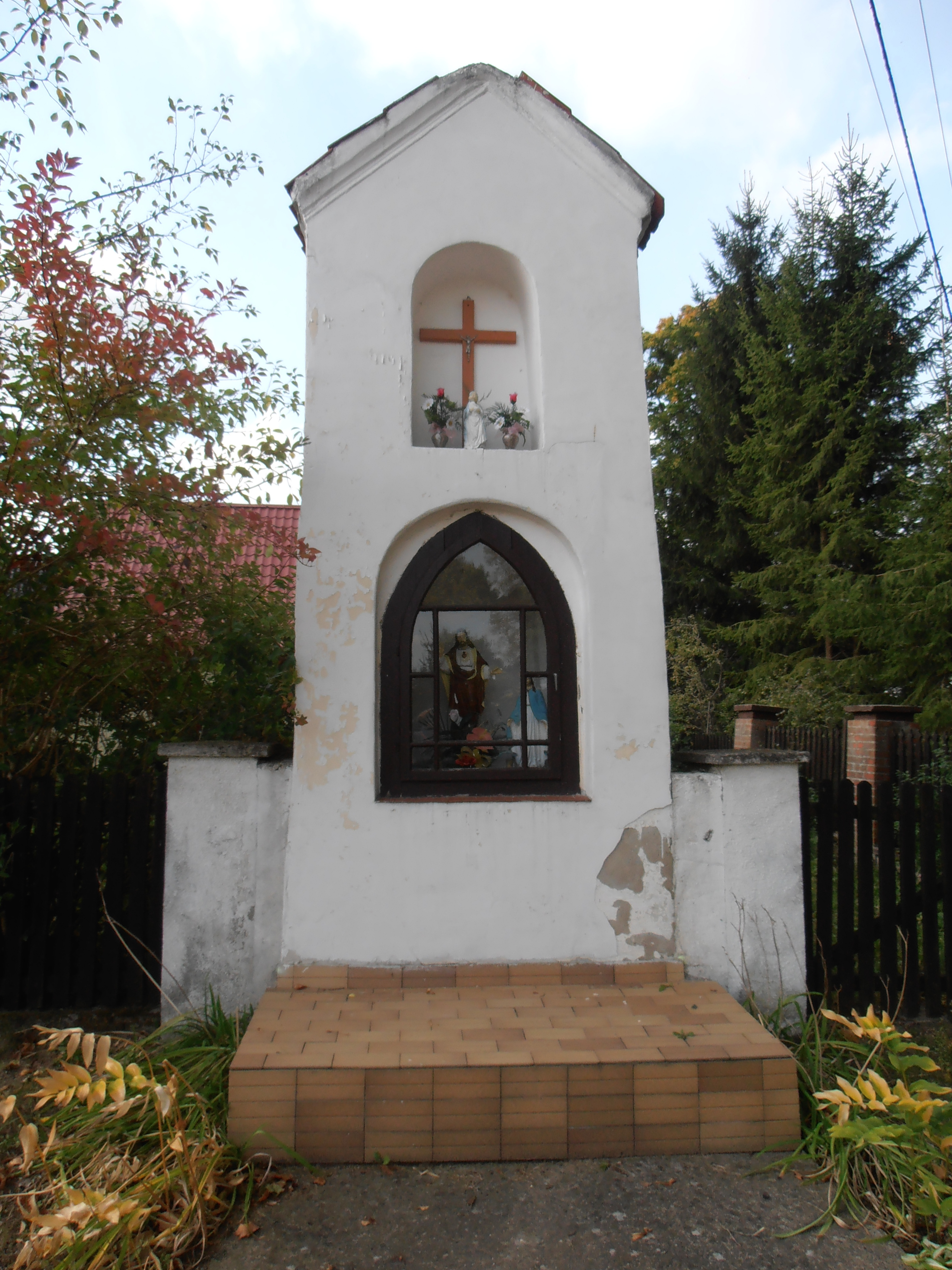
Classicist Warmian wayside shrine nearby the church

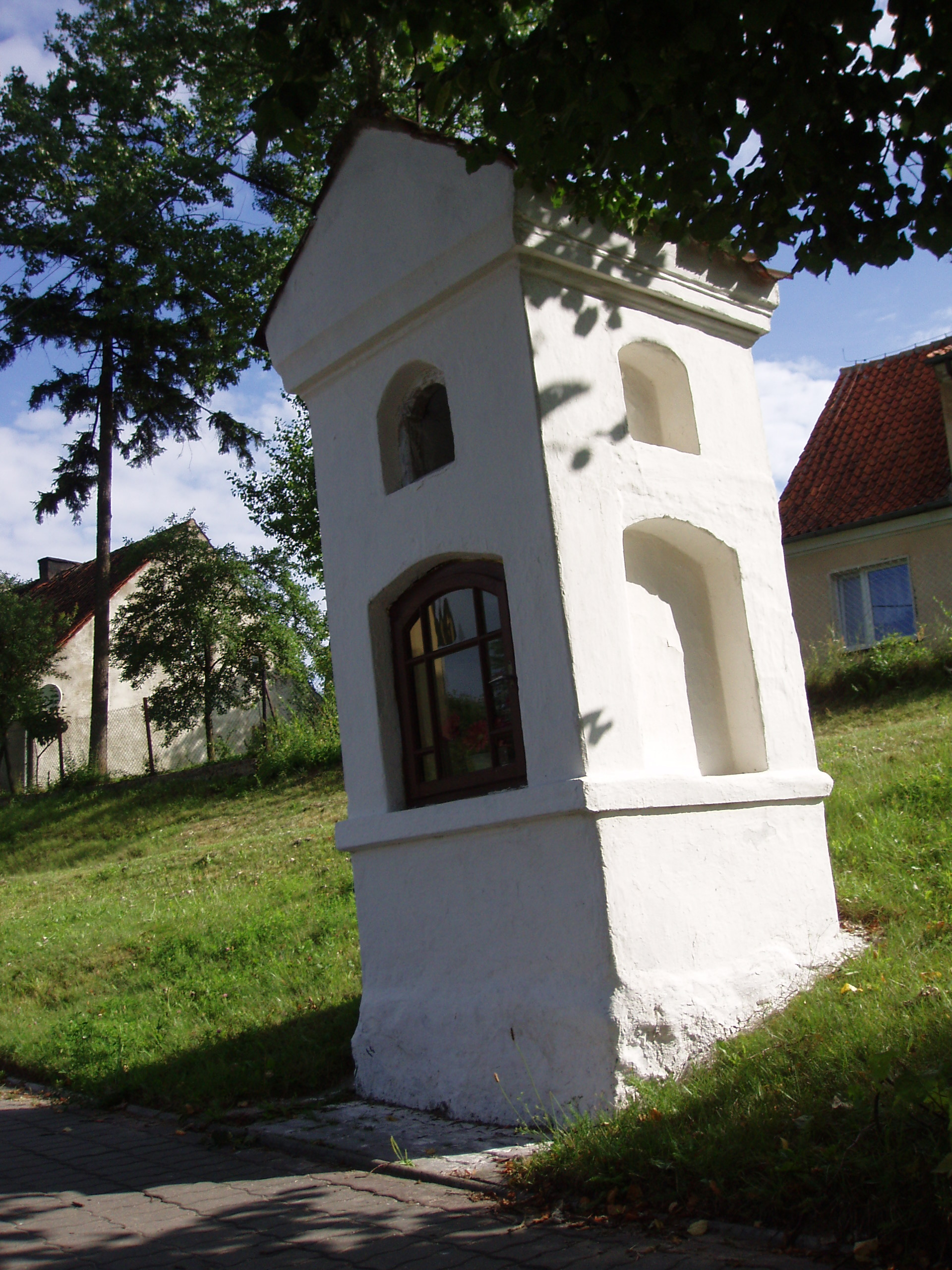
Neoclassicist Warmian wayside shrine

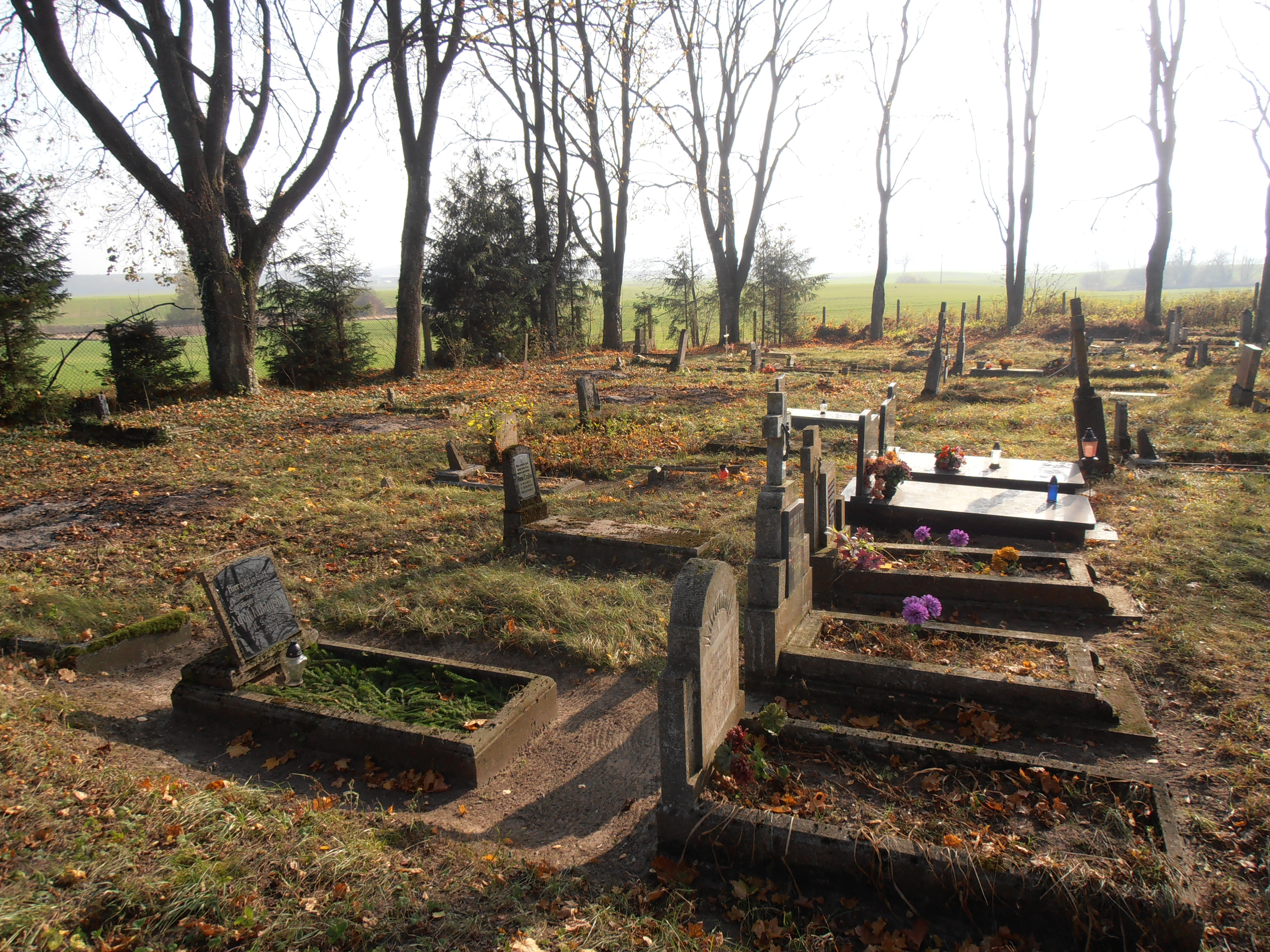
Historic cemetery
