= Muzyka =

Muzyka is a surname. Notable people with the surname include:

- Aleksandr Muzyka (born 1969), former Russian football player
- Alex Muzyka (1929–1993), Canadian football player
- Daniel Muzyka, Professor of Management at The Sauder School of Business, University of British Columbia
- Kirill Muzyka (born 1990), Russian professional football player
- Ray Muzyka CM is a Canadian investor, entrepreneur and physician

== See also ==
- Muszynka
