= Janina Skowronska =

Polish composer

Janina Skowronska (8 February 1920 – 1992) was a Polish composer who is best remembered for her arrangements of folk songs, and for creating Little Chopin, a children’s musical based on the life and works of Frederic Chopin.

Skowronska was born to a Polish family in Germakowka (then in the USSR, now in Ukraine). She studied music at the State Music College in Wroclaw, Poland, and with Tadeusz Szeligowski. She received a diploma in 1961.

Skowronska’s compositions included:

== Chamber ==
- Theme and Variations (string quartet)

== Orchestra ==
- Symphony

== Piano ==
- Preludes
- Rondo
- Waltz

== Theatre ==
- Little Chopin (for children)

== Vocal ==
- Children’s Songs
- Drugi Brzeg (soprano, oboe, two clarinets and horn)
- “Golden Rain”
- Moda Pani Czepca Nie Ma (mixed chorus)
- O Wy Corne Kawki (folk song; mixed chorus)
- Od Krakowa do Wroclawia (folk dance suite; chorus and orchestra)
- Parodie (text by W. Marianowicz; baritone, soprano, bassoon and string orchestra)
- Pokoju Czas (text by R. Heniszowa; mixed chorus)
- Samotne Drzewa (text by L. Turkowski; mixed chorus)
- Suite of Folk Dances (text by Andrzej Waligórski; orchestra and chorus)
- “Tu Bedziemy” (text by A. Burcia; voice and piano)
- Two Folksongs (soprano and piano)
- U.F.O. (for soprano and eight instruments: clarinet, cello, six percussion)
- Ziemio Moja (mixed chorus)
