= Poznań Philharmonic =

Polish symphony orchestra based in Poznań

- Orchestra
- Native name: Filharmonia Poznańska im. Tadeusza Szeligowskiego
- Short name: Filharmonia Poznańska
- Founded: 1947; 79 years ago
- Location: Poznań, Poland
- Concert hall: Aula Uniwersytecka at Adam Mickiewicz University
- Music director: Łukasz Borowicz
- Website: filharmoniapoznanska.pl

The Tadeusz Szeligowski Poznań Philharmonic is a regional cultural institution founded in 1947 on the initiative of Tadeusz Szeligowski as the State Philharmonic in Poznań; one of the two philharmonics in the Greater Poland Voivodeship.

== History ==
The inauguration of the Philharmonic's activities took place on 10 November 1947 under the direction of Stanisław Wisłocki. Since March 1950, the Poznań Nightingales Choir, headed by Stefan Stuligrosz, has been operating at the Philharmonic. The Philharmonic is connected with the Polish contemporary music festival "Poznań Spring", another initiative of Tadeusz Szeligowski.

The concert hall of the Philharmonic is the Hall of the Adam Mickiewicz University, considered to be one of the best in terms of acoustics in Poland.

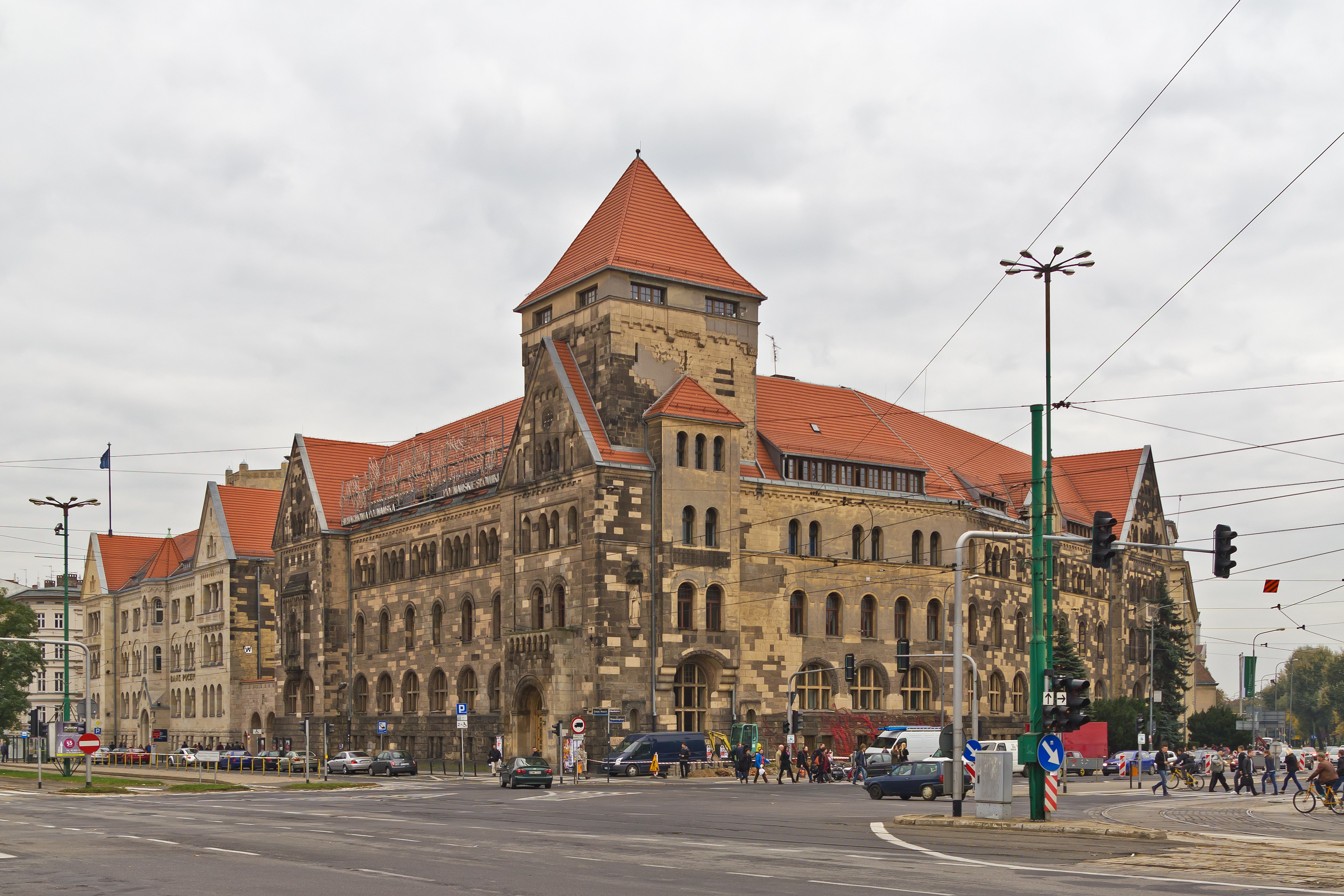
Philharmonic office headquarters on Aleja Niepodległości, in the old Credit Ziemstwo building

Over the years, the philharmonic orchestra has been led by Jerzy Katlewicz, Robert Satanowski, Witold Krzemieński, Zdzisław Szostak, Renard Czajkowski, Wojciech Rajski, Wojciech Michniewski, Andrzej Borejko, Mirosław Jacek Błaszczyk, José Maria Florêncio, Grzegorz Nowak and Marek Pijarowski. In the 2021–2022 artistic season, Łukasz Borowicz became music director and chief conductor of the Poznań Philharmonic Orchestra.

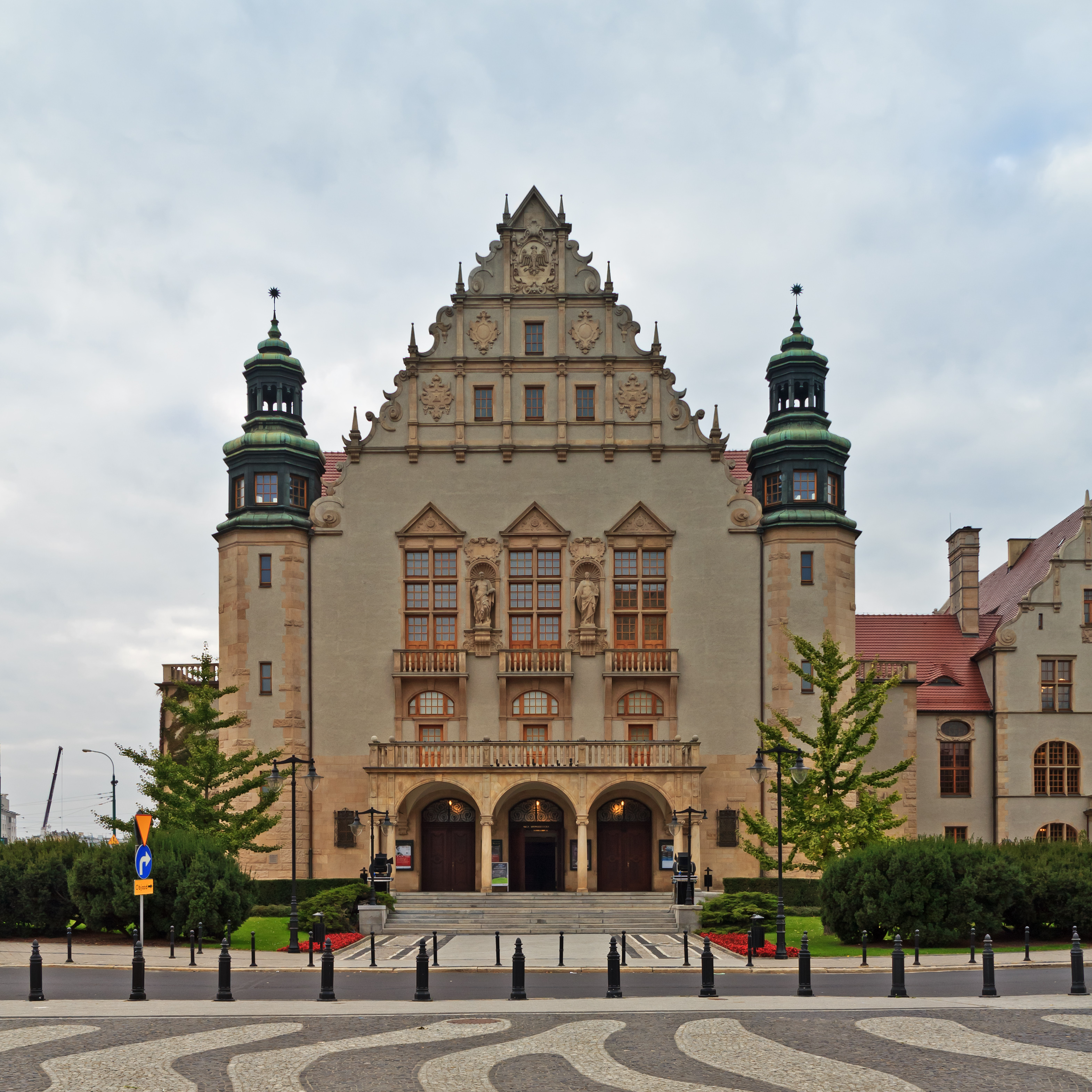
Poznań Philharmonic Concert Hall

The ensemble has performed with many outstanding conductors and soloists, among others: Hermann Abendroth, Stanisław Skrowaczewski, Roberto Benzi, Carlo Zecchi, Artur Rubinstein, Mstisław Rostropowicz, Martha Argerich, Henryk Szeryng, Dawid Ojstrach, Światosław Richter, Malcolm Frager, Monique Haas, Jean Fournier, Narciso Yepes, Gidon Kremer, Maurizio Pollini, Krystian Zimerman, Garrick Ohlsson, Stefania Toczyska, Ewa Podleś, Joanna Kozłowska, Ryszard Karczykowski, Wiesław Ochman, Wojciech Drabowicz, Robert McDuffie and Nikolaj Znaider.

The orchestra has appeared at major musical centres in Poland and abroad and has toured widely in Europe. Its international appearances have included concerts at the Théâtre des Champs-Élysées in Paris, where in 2020 it performed with pianist Rafał Blechacz under Łukasz Borowicz in a programme of Polish music. The same European tour also included concerts in Germany with Blechacz, and appearances with pianist Olga Scheps, violinist Bomsori Kim and pianist Juho Pohjonen.

The orchestra has performed at numerous international festivals, including the Ludwig van Beethoven Easter Festival, Wratislavia Cantans, Romaeuropa-Villa Medici, Kissinger Sommer, Ankara Sanat Festivali, Festwochen in Herrenhausen, Bregenzer Frühling, Dresdner Musikfestspiele, Choriner Musiksommer, Janáčkův Máj and Smetana's Litomyšl. Since 1952 the orchestra has regularly accompanied the finalists of the International Henryk Wieniawski Violin Competition in Poznań.

In addition to its historic collaborations, the orchestra has worked in recent decades with prominent conductors and soloists including Christopher Hogwood, Reinhard Goebel, Sir Neville Marriner, Paul McCreesh, Rafael Payare, Jérémie Rhorer, Ainārs Rubiķis, Piotr Anderszewski, Piotr Beczała, Rafał Blechacz, Gábor Boldoczki, Sarah Chang, Franco Fagioli, Alexander Gavrylyuk, Philippe Jaroussky, Sumi Jo, Olga Kern, Aleksandra Kurzak, Julia Lezhneva, Christian Lindberg, Annick Massis, Albrecht Mayer, Midori, Johannes Moser, Leszek Możdżer, Victoria Mullova, Sergei Nakariakov, Emmanuel Pahud, Vadim Repin, Gil Shaham, Akiko Suwanai, Nayden Todorov, Maxim Vengerov, Arcadi Volodos, Ingolf Wunder and Pretty Yende. Other artists associated with the Philharmonic's residence and tour activity include Bertrand Chamayou, Nikolaj Znaider, Bomsori Kim, Henning Kraggerud, Anastasia Kobekina, Viviane Hagner and Rafał Blechacz.

The Poznań Philharmonic Orchestra has made recordings of symphonic, opera and ballet music for radio, television and record labels including Sony Classical, cpo, Polmusic, Polskie Nagrania, Muza, Largo Records, Dux, CD Accord and Naxos. In 2015, the album World Opera Stars: Ewa Podleś. Live with the Poznań Philharmonic Orchestra, conducted by Łukasz Borowicz, received the L'Orphée d'Or from the French Académie du Disque Lyrique. The orchestra's recording of Feliks Nowowiejski's oratorio Quo vadis, made with Borowicz, the Choir of the Podlasie Opera and Philharmonic and soloists Wioletta Chodowicz, Robert Gierlach and Wojtek Gierlach, was released by cpo and received an International Classical Music Award in 2018.

Recent recordings have included world phonographic premieres of works by Michał Bergson, Stefan Bolesław Poradowski, Feliks Nowowiejski, Grzegorz Fitelberg, Emil Młynarski, Franz Xaver Scharwenka and Andrzej Panufnik. The 2024 harmonia mundi album Urlicht. Songs of Death and Resurrection, with baritone Samuel Hasselhorn, the Poznań Philharmonic Orchestra, boys' voices of the Poznań Nightingales, the Boys and Men's Choir of the Poznań Philharmonic and Łukasz Borowicz, received the International Classical Music Awards 2025 in the categories Vocal Music and Recording of the Year.

== Directors ==
Directors/conductors of the Poznań Philharmonic Symphony Orchestra (chronologically):

1. Stanisław Wisłocki
2. Jerzy Katlewicz
3. Robert Satanowski
4. Witold Krzemieński
5. Zdzisław Szostak
6. Renard Czajkowski
7. Wojciech Rajski
8. Wojciech Michniewski
9. Andrey Boreyko
10. Mirosław Jacek Błaszczyk
11. José Maria Florêncio
