= Maklakov =

Maklakov (Russian: Маклаков) is a Russian masculine surname, its feminine counterpart is Maklakova. It is derived from the Russian word maklak (маклак), petty broker. Notable people with the name include:

- Aleksei Maklakov (born 1962), actor and singer
- Nikolay Maklakov (1871–1918), politician, younger brother of
- Vasily Maklakov (1869–1957), trial lawyer

== See also ==
- Maklakiewicz
