= Aurelio Canonici =

Italian conductor and composer

Aurelio Canonici (Genoa, 30 December 1965) is an Italian conductor and composer.

Canonici studied piano and composition at the Conservatorio Nicolò Paganini in Genoa and specialized in orchestra conducting at the Hochschule für Musik in Vienna from 1992 to 1995.

The most important orchestras he has conducted include the Virtuosi di Santa Cecilia, the Pomeriggi Musicali, the Orchestra Internazionale d’Italia, Budapest Concert Orchestra (MAV), Istanbul State Symphony Orchestra (IDSO), Württembergische Philharmonie Reutlingen, Sinfonieorchester Wuppertal, Arpeggione Kammerorchester, the Bucharest National Radio Orchestra, the Warsaw National Radio Orchestra, the Krakow Philharmonic, the Warsaw National Opera Orchestra and the Krakow Opera (Opera Krakowska).

Since 2008 he has been the Artistic Director of the “Richard Wagner” Symphonic Section of the Ravello Festival.

== Awards ==
In December 2010 the Councilor for Arts and Culture of the City of Savona, in the Chiabrera Theatre, has given Maestro Canonici the 2010 "Premio Cirone" for his activity as Conductor and Composer.

== Publications ==
In May 2009 Le Cáriti Editore (Florence) published Aurelio Canonici’s Book “Musica e Sofia – Problematiche filosofiche nell’opera di Richard Wagner” (Music and Sophia - Philosophical Issues in Richard Wagner's opera) ISBN 88-87657-49-1.
