= Tadeusz Wojciech Maklakiewicz =

Polish composer, music educator and activist

Tadeusz Wojciech Maklakiewicz (20 October 1922, Mszczonów – 24 March 1996, Warsaw) was a Polish composer, music educator, activist and jurist.

Maklakiewicz came from a family of musical traditions, being his brothers John and Francis composers. He studied law at the Jagiellonian University between 1945 and 1949, and then musical composition under the direction of Tadeusz Szeligowski at the National Academy of Music in Warsaw between 1954 and 1958. He worked at the State Music Publishing House in Kraków, in the Office Live ARTOS, at the Central Clinic Amateur Artistic Movements (CPARA) in the 1950s, and in the 1960s at the Polish Radio in Warsaw. Member of the National Council of PRON in 1983.

He taught and worked at the State Higher School of Music in Warsaw for 40 years. He was administrative director, dean, head of the Department of Music Education, pro-rector and rector (1975-1978). He developed his pedagogical work at the Department of Music Education. He taught the following theoretical subjects: counterpoint, harmony and propaedeutics of composition.

He carried out extensive social activities. He was president and vice-president of ZAiKS (1968-1971 and 1993-1996), chairman of the music section of the Council for Higher Artistic Education, general secretary of the Board of the Polish Association of Choirs and Orchestras. Member of the presidium of the Association Européenne des Conservatoires, vice-chairman of the board of the Polish section of the Société Européenne de Culture. From 1988 to 1990 member of the Council for the Protection of Remembrance of Struggle and Martyrdom.

He was chairman of the jury of the Soldier Song Festival in Kolobrzeg, juror of the International Song Festival in Sopot and the Soviet Song Festival in Zielona Gora.

His compositional output includes works for vocal voices and for choir. He is the author of the "Highland Mass" and the "Kurpie Suite" performed by most Polish choirs. He also worked on arrangements of patriotic songs and carols for vocal ensembles.

He is buried in the Powązki Cemetery in Warsaw (klin-4-5).
