= Legenda Bałtyku =

Legenda Bałtyku ("The Legend of the Baltic") is a 1924 Polish opera by Feliks Nowowiejski. It is a neo-romantic nationalist opera.

Legenda Bałtyku premiered in Poznań, Poland, on 28 November 1924. Opera Poznan staged the opera in 1955 and Lodz Opera Company staged it in 1965.

== Plot ==
The plot concerns the task set for the poor fisherman Doman (tenor) by Mestwin, the father of the maiden Bogna - to obtain the ring of Queen Jurata whose kingdom lies in the depths of the Baltic Sea. The second act aria of Doman "Czy ty mnie kochasz, o dziewczyno?" (Do you love me oh girl?") is still occasionally performed in recitals.
