= Feliks Nowowiejski =

Polish musician

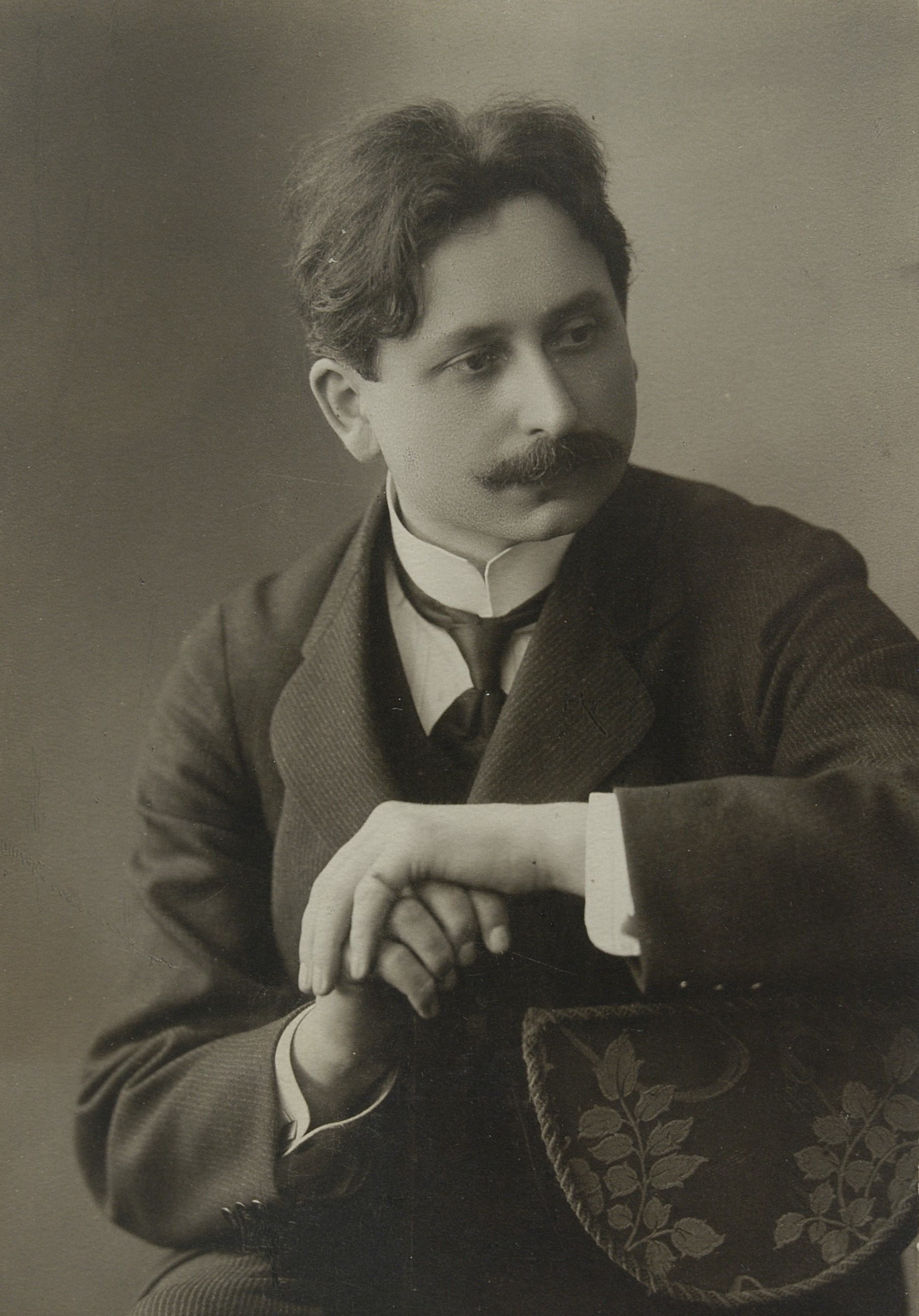
- Born: 7 February 1877; Wartenburg in Ostpreußen, Germany
- Died: 18 January 1946 (aged 68); Poznań, Poland
- Resting place: Church of St. Adalbert, Poznań
- Known for: Music
- Notable work: Rota, Legenda Bałtyku

Feliks Nowowiejski (7 February 1877 – 18 January 1946) was a Polish composer, conductor, concert organist, and music teacher. Nowowiejski was born in Wartenburg (today Barczewo) in Warmia in the Prussian Partition of Poland (then administratively part of the Province of East Prussia, German Empire). He died in Poznań, Poland.

== Childhood ==
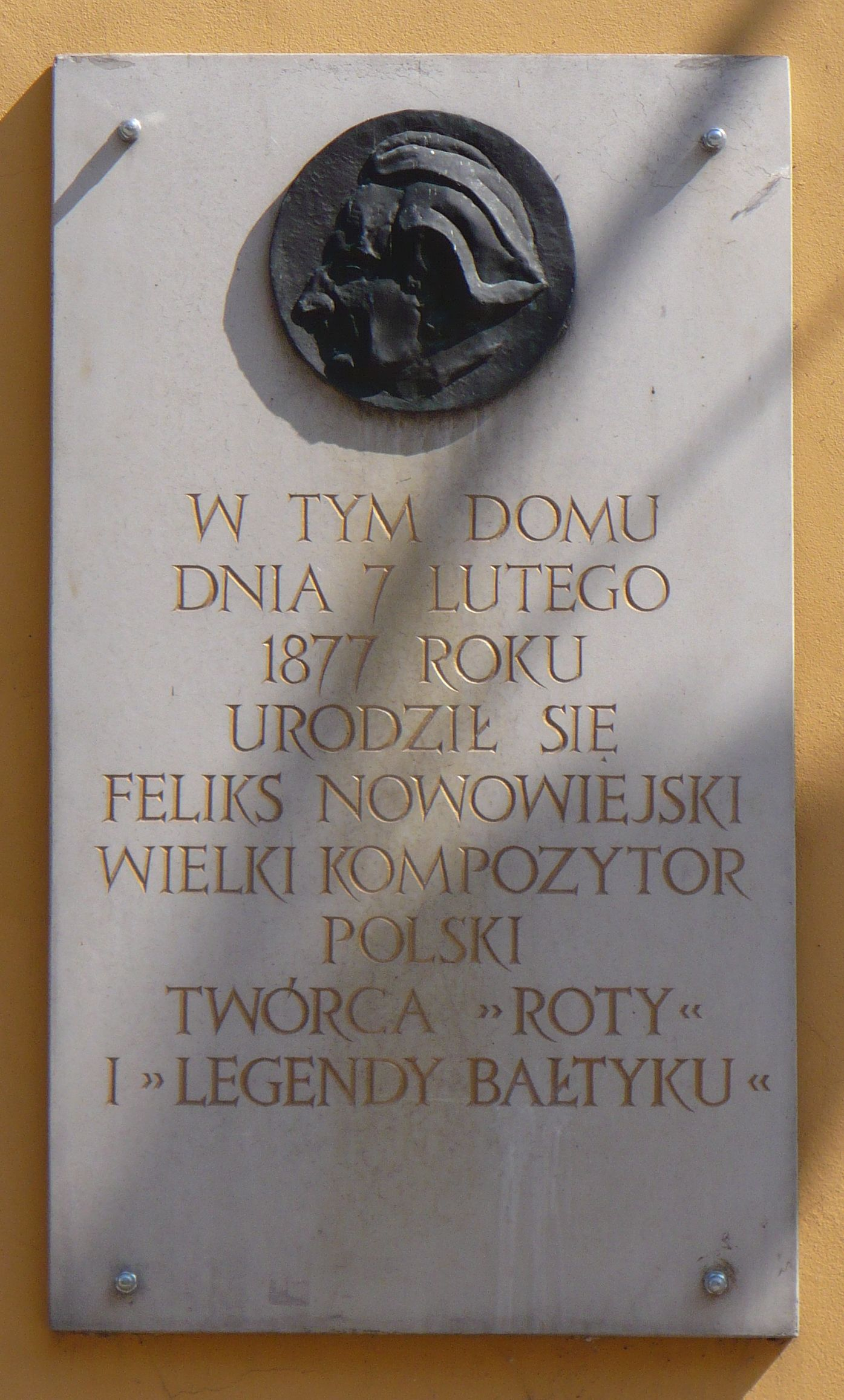
Commemorative plaque at the composer's birthplace in Barczewo

Feliks Nowowiejski was born the fifth of 11 siblings. Nowowiejski's ancestors, like himself, came from Warmia, a region which was part of the Polish Kingdom prior to the First Partition of Poland in 1772. His father was Franz Adam Nowowiejski, a Pole born in 1830 in Wartenburg in Warmia (former Polish Wartembork). His grandfather was Jan Nowowiejski, born in 1730 in Warmia, who married the Pole Anna Jabłońska from Tuławki. Franz Adam Nowowiejski was a master tailor with his own workshop in Wartenburg, where he also managed a public library of Polish books. Feliks Nowowiejski's mother, née Katharina Falk, born in 1847, was the second wife of Franz Adam Nowowiejski; she was a German from the neighboring village of Butryny (at the time German Wuttrienen). While Franz Adam Nowowiejski enthusiastically promoted Polish culture, Feliks's mother displayed a strong interest in the arts, particularly as a pianist. With her participation in performances of Polish folk songs and recitations of noted poets from Poland and Germany as well as her own poetry, she fostered the formidable musical talent of her son, likely an inheritance from her. Despite the patriotic Polish stance of their father, his children spoke better German than they did Polish. As a result, even before his time in Berlin, Feliks Nowowiejski could only write and speak in German.

== Education ==
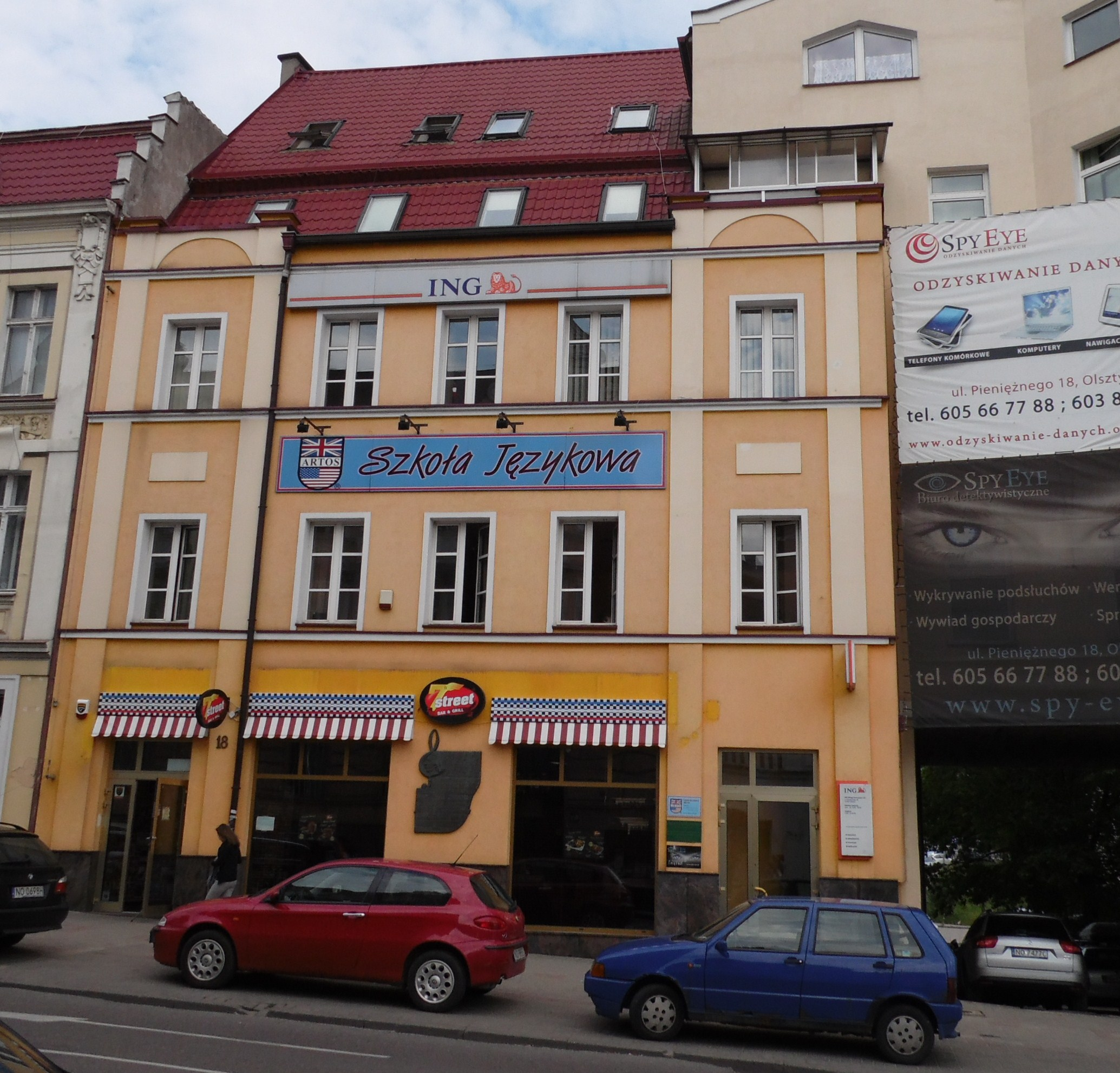
House of Feliks Nowowiejski in Olsztyn

Nowowiejski's family had lived in Warmia for several generations. In 1883 Feliks Nowowiejski became a pupil at the elementary school in Wartenburg at the rectory of St. Anne's Church. Due to his musical talent—he composed his first piano work, a suite of classical and contemporary dances, he entered the convent school in Święta Lipka (at the time Heiligelinde), where he was taught harmony, violin, cello, French horn, piano, and organ. However, he was unable to complete his studies because of the necessity of providing the sole support for his family. With the bankruptcy of his father's workshop, the impoverished family resettled in Olsztyn (at the time Allenstein) in 1893.

== Career ==
In 1893 Nowowiejski became a violinist in the orchestra of the Prussian Regiment of Grenadiers, a development that enabled him to support his parents and siblings. He then composed works for military bands and amateur orchestras. Thanks to a composition prize for his march Pod sztandarem pokoju (Under the Banner of Peace), he was able to study at the Stern Conservatory from April to September 1898. From 1888 to 1900 he assumed the post of organist at St. James’ Church in Allenstein. After being awarded a second prize, he completed a three-month course in counterpoint, Palestrina, and Gregorian chant at the College of Catholic Church Music and Musical Education in Regensburg, Bavaria. He subsequently studied at the Stern Conservatory in Berlin, learning theory and counterpoint under Ludwig Bussler, composition under Wilhelm Taubert, and Gradus ad Parnassum under Heinrich Bellerman, simultaneously perfecting his organ playing under Otto Dienel and playing in the orchestra under the baton of Gustav Hollaender. After submitting a cantata to the Royal Academy of Arts, Berlin, he was accepted into a master class for composition under Max Bruch from 1900 to 1902. At the same time he began studies in musicology and aesthetics at Frederick William University. In Berlin he came into contact with Polish intellectuals and developed a strong Polish patriotism that would often later be reflected in his works, e.g. his Warmian Motifs, Polish Courtship, or Quo Vadis.

For his oratorio Powrót syna marnotrawnego (Return of the Prodigal Son), Nowowiejski won his first Giacomo Meyerbeer Prize. With the 4,500 marks of prize money, he financed an educational tour of Germany, Bohemia, Moravia, Austria, Italy, Africa, France and Belgium, during which he met Gustav Mahler, Camille Saint-Saëns, Pietro Mascagni and Ruggero Leoncavallo. In 1903, he won the Ludwig van Beethoven Prize for his overture Swaty polskie (Polish Courtship). In 1904, for two symphonies, one in A minor (which he later withdrew) and Symphony No. 1 in B-flat Minor, he was awarded his second Giacomo Meyerbeer Prize. With the prize money, Nowowiejski continued his studies under Bruch. He became a composition teacher and choir director at St. Hedwig's Cathedral in Berlin, and later at the Dominican Church of St. Paul. In 1907 he won a composition competition in Lwów (now Lviv) with the song Żałobny pochód Kościuszki na Wawel (Funeral Procession of Kościuszko to Wawel); Tadeusz Kościuszko was a Polish general and national hero who also fought in the American Revolution; Wawel is the historic seat of Polish kings.

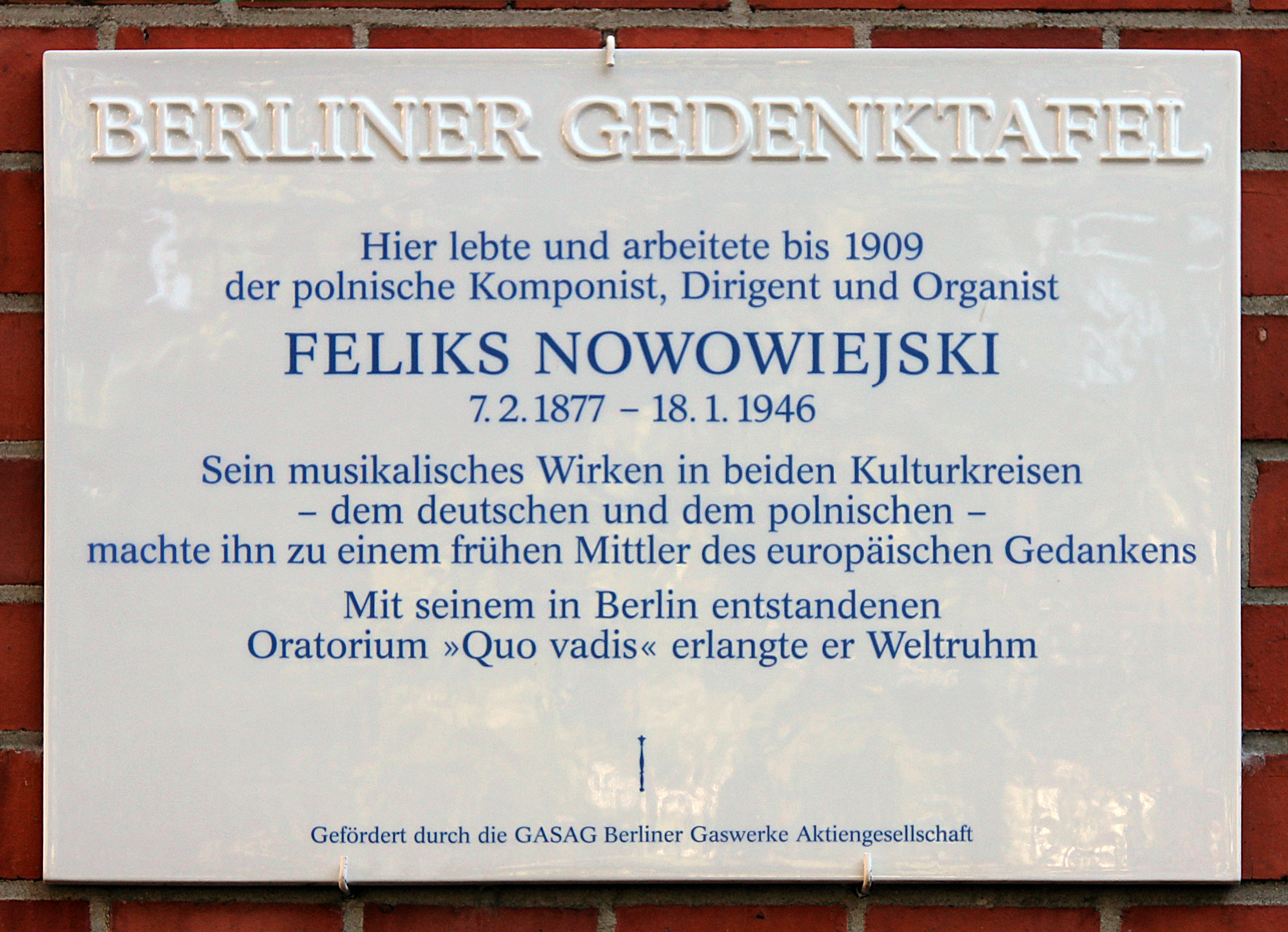
Memorial plaque on the facade of the St. Paul Church in Berlin, in which Nowowiejski was an organist and choir conductor

In 1907, he composed the massive oratorio Quo Vadis, based on the novel by Polish compatriot Henryk Sienkiewicz. After its Amsterdam premiere in 1909, the oratorio was performed in more than 150 cities in Europe, and North and South America, securing Nowowiejski's international reputation.

In 1909 Nowowiejski returned to Poland (then partitioned), and settled in Kraków, where he served as director of the Krakow Music Society. He was also organist and director of the Warsaw Symphony. On 15 July 1910 - the 500th anniversary of the Battle of Grunwald - the citizens of Krakow gathered in Jan Matejko Square to sing the Rota by Maria Konopnicka under Nowowiejski's direction. Rota was a patriotic poem protesting Germanisation that Nowowiejski had set to music. In 1910, with his piece Zagasły już (Extinguished), Nowowiejski took first prize in a Lwów composing competition commemorating the 100th birthday of Frédéric Chopin. In March 1911, Nowowiejski married the Wawel music student Elżbieta Mironow-Mirocka. The couple had five children, a daughter Wanda and four sons: Feliks, Kazimierz, Adam and Jan. In 1914, Nowowiejski won the Lwów Music Prize for his choral work Danae.

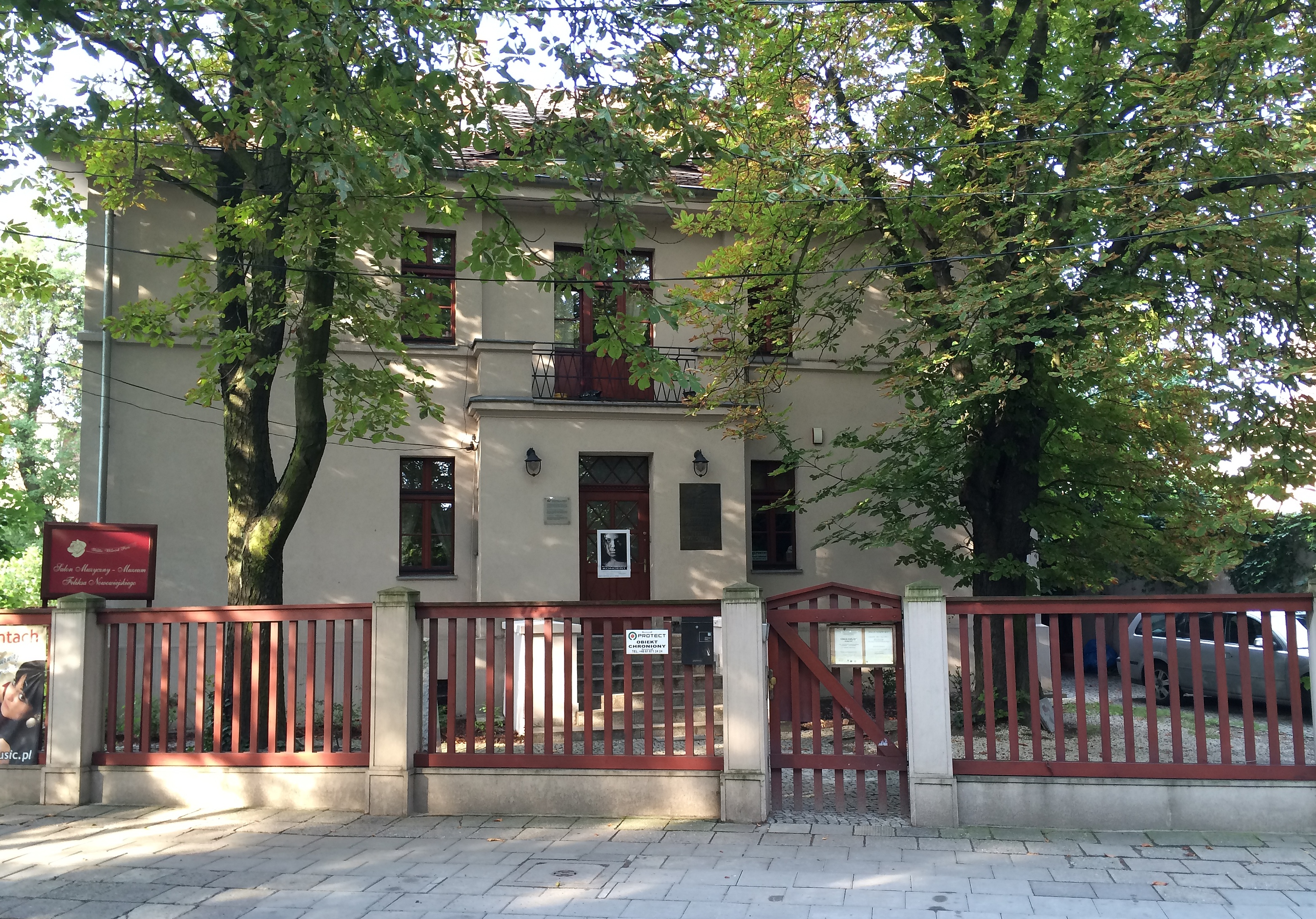
House of Feliks Nowowiejski in Poznań, currently a museum

== World War One ==
Facing increasing hostility in Poland at the outbreak of World War I in 1914, Nowowiejski returned to Berlin. He came under military service, swore an oath to Emperor Wilhelm II, and served as a conductor to a military orchestra. At the end of the war, he returned to the now-Polish city of Poznań. He became a docent at the Ignacy Jan Paderewski Music Academy of Poznań, where he served as composer, conductor, and organist. His appearances as a pro-Polish speaker at the 1920 plebiscite campaigns in Warmia and Masuria (which determined whether these territories would be German or Polish) suggest an increased Polish patriotism. This in turn led to a quarrel with his former teacher Bruch, who successfully called for a German boycott of Nowowiejski's works. Thereupon Nowowiejski fell into obscurity in Germany as his music was no longer performed. In 1935. Nowowiejski received the title of papal chamberlain from Pope Pius XI for his many religious works. The next year he received the Order of Polonia Restituta, one of the nation's highest honours.

== World War Two and later life ==
During the German invasion of Poland at the start of World War II in 1939, Nowowiejski hid first among the nuns of St. Elizabeth's Hospital in Poznań, afterwards fleeing to Kraków. He had briefly been detained under suspicion of spying for Russia (upon denunciation by a passerby). After World War II, when the region of Warmia became again part of Poland, Nowowiejski was seen increasingly as a Pole due to his pro-Polish views and Polish themes in so many of his works. He subsequently received many honours.

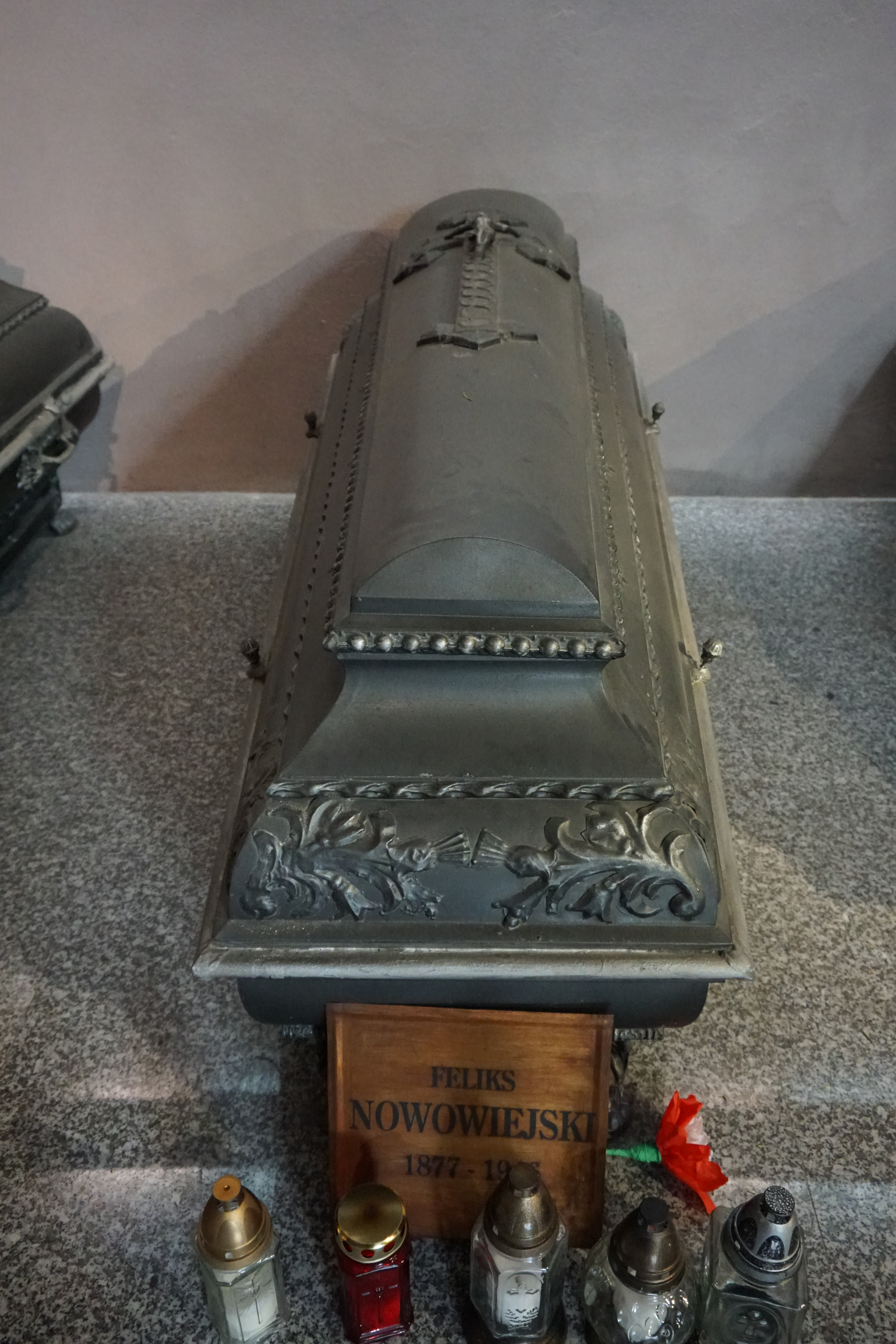
Nowowiejski's grave in the St. Adalbert's Church in Poznań

After a severe stroke in December 1941, Nowowiejski ended his musical productivity. After a return to Poznań in 1945, he died on 15 January 1946. His memorial grave is located at St. Adalbert's Church in Poznań.

== Selected works ==
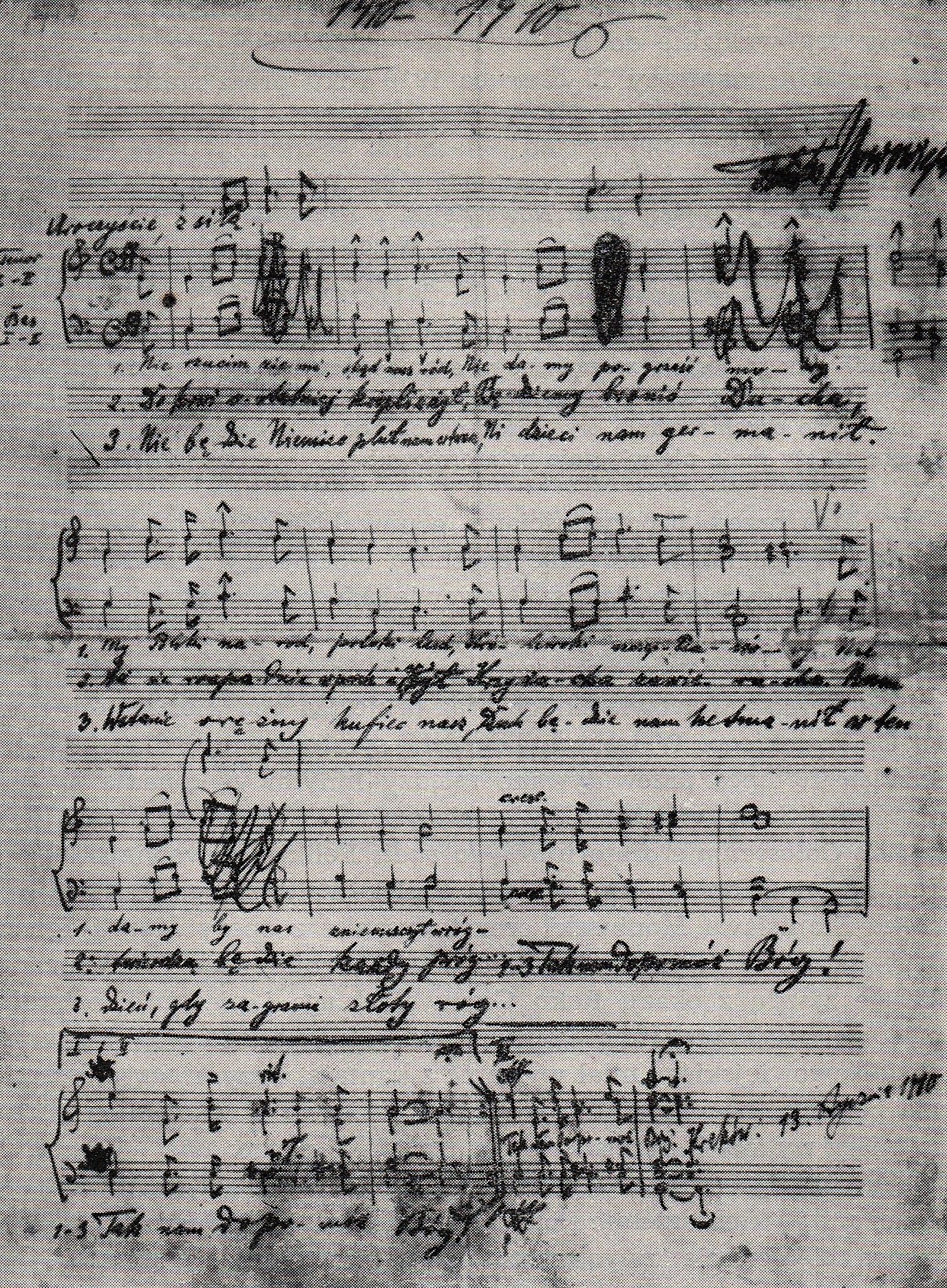
Manuscript of Rota

=== Opera ===
- Busola (in German: Der Kompass, 1906)
- Emigranci (The Emigrants, 1917).
- Legenda Bałtyku, Op. 28 (The Legend of the Baltic, 1924)
- Legenda Kaszuba (The Legend of Kashubia, 1933, Comic opera
- Ondraszek (1939)

=== Ballet ===
- Malowanki ludowe (Folk Paintings), "Ballet-Opera" (1928)
- Król wichrów (The King of the Winds), Op. 37 (1929)

=== Choral works ===
- Oratorio, Powrót syna marnotrawnego, Op. 3 (The Return of the Prodigal Son, 1902, awarded the Giacomo Meyerbeer Prize).
- Oratorio, Znalezienie Świętego Krzyża, Op. 14 (The Discovery of the Holy Cross, with the famous Pace Domine, 1906).
- Oratorio, Quo vadis, Op. 30 (1909).
- Slawische Volksszene (Slavic Folk Scene, 1912)
- The Mystery of the Cross with Psalm 136 (unfinished)
- Missa pro pace, Op. 49/3 (1935)

=== Symphonies ===
- Nordlandfahrt (1900; lost)
- Symphony in B minor (1903; lost)
- Symphony No. 1, "The Seven Colors of the Iris", Op. 12 (1904)
- Symphony No. 2, "Work and Rhythm", Op. 52 (1937)
- Symphony No. 3, "From Białowieża", Op. 53 (1939)
- Symphony No. 4, "Symphony of Peace", Op. 58, for 3 solo voices, narrator, mixed choir and orchestra (1941)

=== Orchestral ===
- Overture, Polish Courtship (1903), awarded the Ludwig van Beethoven Prize.
- Three Symphonic Poems, Op. 17
  - 1. Beatrice (1903)
  - 2. Nina and Pergolesi (1905)
  - 3. The Death of Helena (1915)

=== Concertante works ===
- Legende for violin and orchestra (1914)
- Cello Concerto, Op. 55 (1938)
- Piano Concerto in D minor, Slavonic, Op. 60 (1941)

=== Songs ===
- Song, Rota (1910).
- 5 Orchestral symphonies (the 1st symphony is not extant) (1903, 1904, 1937, 1939, 1941)

=== Organ ===
- 9 organ symphonies Op. 45 (c. 1929–31)
- 4 organ concertos Op. 56 (c. 1930–40)
- In Paradisum, the organ poem, Op. 61 (1941)

=== Piano ===
- March, Pod sztandarem pokoju (Under the Banner of Peace, 1898, awarded a prize in London).
- Backfischchens Traum, Op.5 (1898)

== See also ==
- List of Polish composers
