= Alex Muzyka =

Canadian football player (c. 1929–1993)

Profile
- Position: Guard

Personal information
- Born: c. 1929; Hamilton, Ontario, Canada
- Died: February 23, 1993 (aged 64); Hamilton, Ontario, Canada
- Listed height: 5 ft 11 in (1.80 m)
- Listed weight: 206 lb (93 kg)

Career history
- 1950–1955: Hamilton Tiger-Cats

Awards and highlights
- Grey Cup champion (1953)

Alexander Muzyka (c. 1929 – February 23, 1993) was a Canadian professional football player who played for the Hamilton Tiger-Cats. He won the Grey Cup with Hamilton in 1953. He later worked for Bell Canada as a telephone repairman. Muzyka died after heart surgery in 1993.
