= Polish Composers' Union =

The Polish Composers' Union (Polish: Związek Kompozytorów Polskich, ZKP) is a society of Polish composers and musicologists.

== History ==
The association was founded in Kraków on August 29 or September 1, 1945 by the All-Polish Composers' Congress, as a continuation of the Association of Polish Composers founded in 1925. Warsaw was chosen as the headquarters of the association. In addition to the composers, since 1948 the association was also supposed to include musicologists, who formed a separate section.

The Polish government expected that the organization would promote the introduction of the doctrine of Socialist Realism. Only after Polish October (1956), a loosening of the political climate in the People's Republic of Poland, did the ideologization of Polish culture end. The "Warsaw Autumn", the festival for contemporary music in Poland, has been held every year since 1956.

The circle of young composers was founded in 1949. The young composers' competition has been held every year since 1958 (the Tadeusz Baird Competition since 1981). The association consists of eight branches in Bydgoszcz, Gdańsk, Katowice, Kraków, Lublin, Łódź, Poznań, Warsaw and Wrocław.

The organization endured past the transition to the Third Polish Republic in 1989. Since 2001, the association has been running the Polish Center for Music Information (Polish Polskie Centrum Informacji Muzycznej), a member of the International Association of Music Information Centres in Brussels.

== Chairpersons ==
- Piotr Perkowski (1945–1948)
- Zygmunt Mycielski (1948–1950)
- Witold Rudziński (1950–1951)
- Tadeusz Szeligowski (1951–1954)
- Kazimierz Sikorski (1954–1959)
- Zbigniew Turski (1959–1960)
- Stefan Śledziński (1960–1973)
- Jan Stęszewski (1973–1979)
- Józef Patkowski (1979–1985)
- Krzysztof Meyer (1985–1989)
- Andrzej Chodkowski (1989–1993)
- Maciej Małecki (1993–1999)
- Krzysztof Knittel (1999–2003)
- Jerzy Kornowicz (2003–2015)
- Mieczysław Kominek (since 2015)

== Bibliography ==
- 50 lat Związku Kompozytorów Polskich, ZKP, Warsaw, 1995, ISBN 83-903753-0-3.
- Nowa dekada. Związek Kompozytorów Polskich 1995–2005, Polskie Centrum Informacji Muzycznej, Warsaw 2006, ISBN 83-924522-0-8.
