= Robert Satanowski =

Polish general and conductor

- Born: January 20, 1918
- Origin: Poland
- Died: August 9, 1997 (aged 79)

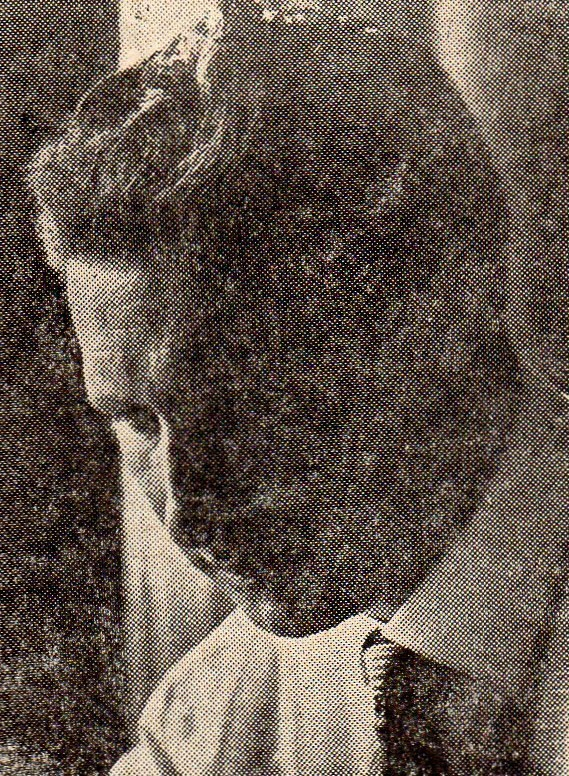
Robert Satanowski

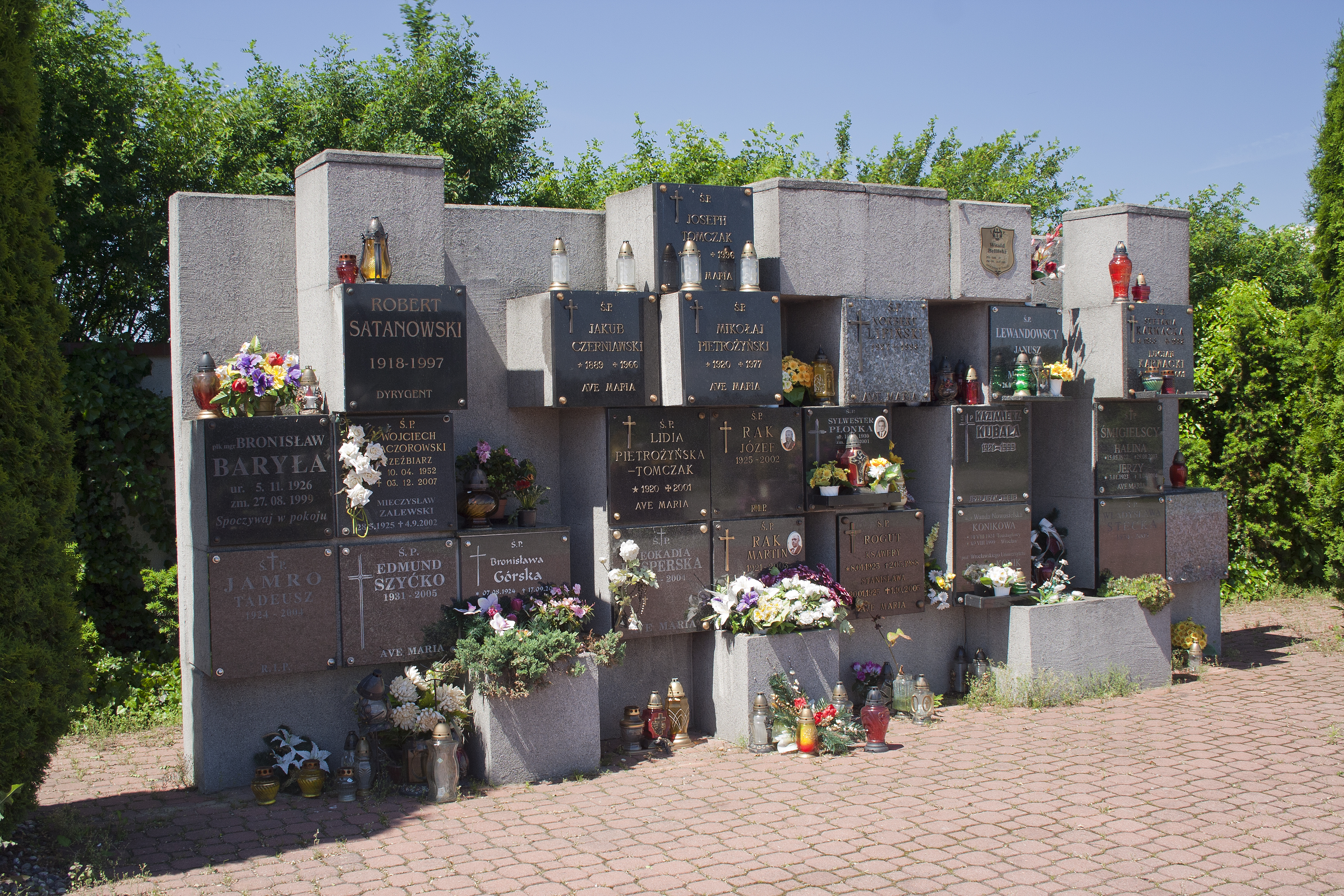
Columbarium for Robert Satanowski, Psie Pole Communal Cemetery, Wrocław

Robert Satanowski (January 20, 1918 – August 9, 1997) was a Polish general who later became a major European orchestra and opera conductor.

== Life ==
=== Military career ===
A teacher with a background in engineering, during World War II he joined the Soviet-aligned Polish resistance in Volhynia where he became a leader of his own group of partisans. Later he joined the Ludowe Wojsko Polskie, where he reached the rank of a general. Later he joined the Polish Navy, but in 1949 he resigned from the military.

=== Music career ===
He started a career in music, becoming the director of Lublin Philharmony (1951-1954) and Pomeranian Symphony Orchestra (1954-1958). Later, he studied opera production and became the artistic director of opera in Karl-Marx-Stadt (now Chemnitz), Poznań (1963–1965), Kraków (1975–1977), Wrocław (1977–1982), Warsaw (1981-1991), and Aachen (1991–92). He also worked as a guest conductor across Europe, North America, as well as Iran and Turkey.
