= Verbum nobile =

1861 opera by Stanisław Moniuszko

- Comic opera by Stanisław Moniuszko
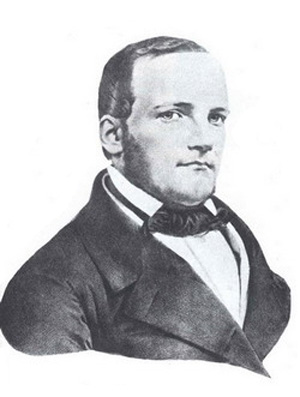
- The composer
- Native title: Verbum nobile
- Librettist: Jan Chęciński
- Language: Polish
- Premiere: 1 January 1861; Teatr Wielki, Warsaw

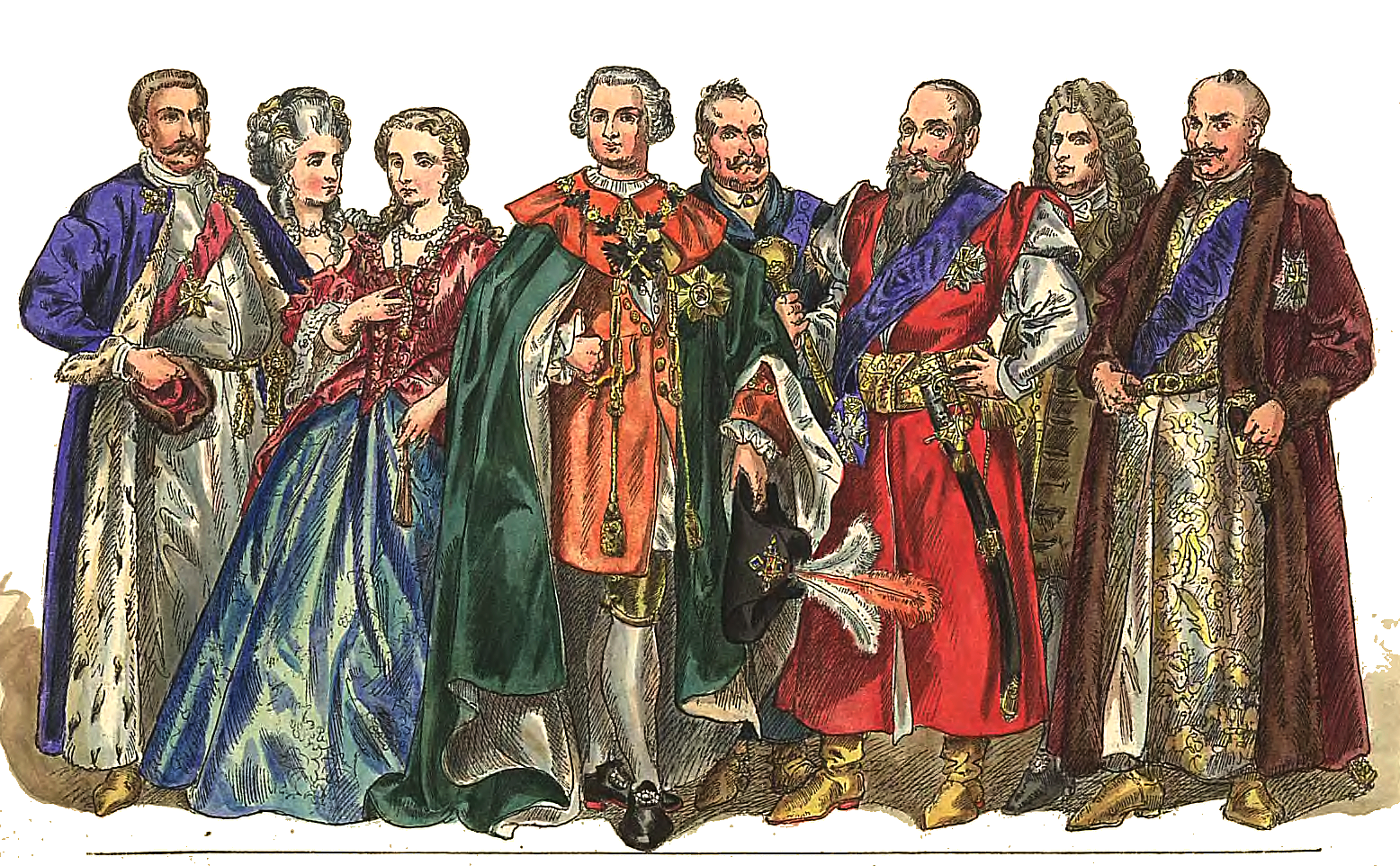
Polish magnates (1697-1795) painting by Jan Matejko, circa 1893

Verbum nobile (The Word of a nobleman) is a one-act comic opera by Polish national composer Stanisław Moniuszko written to a libretto by Jan Chęciński, and set in 18th century Poland before foreign partitions of the country. It was first performed at the Teatr Wielki, Warsaw, on 1 January 1861 to instant popularity.

== Roles ==
Role	Voice type	Premiere Cast, 1861 (Conductor: - )
Serwacy Łagoda	bass	Wilhelm Troschel
Zuzia, (his daughter)	soprano	Bronislawa Dowiadowska-Klimowiczowa
Marcin Pakula	baritone	Ján Koehler
Michal (his son)	baritone	Adam Ziółkowski
Bartolomiej, Marcin's servant	bass-baritone	Adolf Kozieradzki

== Synopsis ==
The plot is a rehash of a familiar operatic theme. Zuzia and Michal are promised to each other by their parents, without their having met; they meet accidentally and fall in love. Michal, having given his name as Stanisław, is refused Zusia's hand by her father, who has given his word to Serwacy, Michal's father, on the betrothal. All is explained, preventing a duel between Marcin and Serwacy, and the marriage can go ahead.

== Recordings ==
- Poznań Opera conducted by Robert Satanowski, MUSA PND 247 (1993)
- Verbum Nobile Aleksander Teliga, Leszek Skrla, Aleksandra Buczek, Michal Partyka, Janusz Lewandowski, Orkiestra Opery na Zamku, Warcislaw Kunc. Dux 2013
