= Adelina Paschalis-Souvestre =

Polish soprano

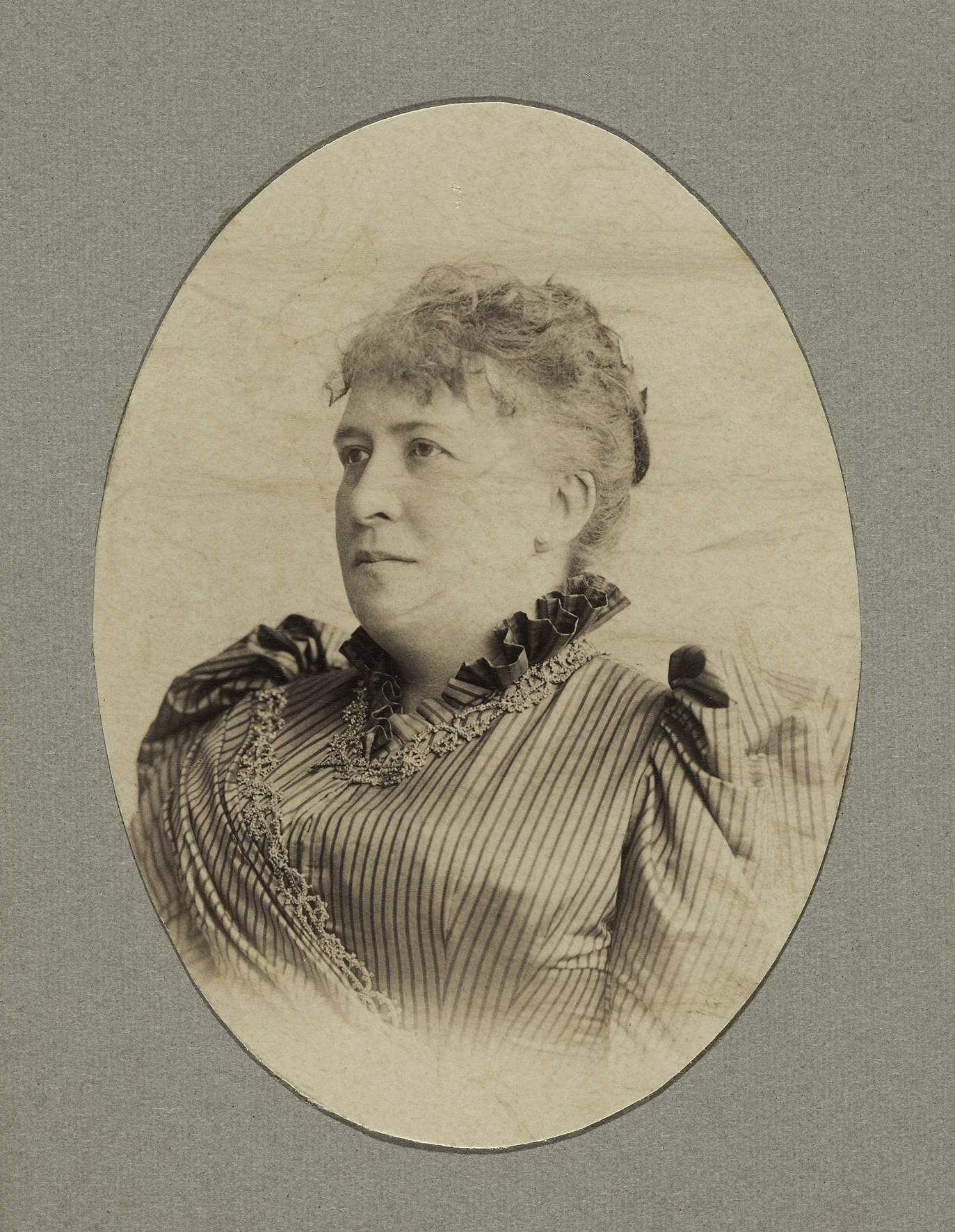
Adelina Paschalis-Souvestre

Adelina Paschalis-Souvestre (1845 – 23 March 1925) was a Polish soprano and music teacher.

== Life ==
Paschalis-Souvestre was born in Warsaw in 1845. A student of Julián Dobrski, she graduated from the Chopin University of Music. In 1867, she left for further vocal studies in Italy. She studied in Milan with G. Corsi and Francesco Lamperti. On 15 January 1869, she made her debut in Cuneo in Norma; in the same year she appeared in Norma in Odessa. In the following years, she was a prima donna, including in Rome, Palermo (1870), Turin, Genoa, Venice, Trieste, and also in Nice (1874), Barcelona (1875). In 1875, she returned to Warsaw and on 28 December 1875 appeared for the first time as Amneris in Aida; in 1875–76, she sang Azucena in Il Trovatore, Margaret in Faust, Fides in Le Prophète. In April and May 1876, she performed in amateur performances in Lviv, and in May of the same year in a concert in Krakow. In 1876, she performed abroad again and sang, among others, in Lisbon, Mexico, Havana, New York, Frankfurt, Prague and Kiev. During the 1882/1883 season, she performed at La Scala Milan. In 1885, she went to Lviv with her husband, invited for performances. During the 1885/1886 season, they sang together in Lviv.

Her repertoire was very large and varied. Her best work was in addition to the role of Leonora (Il Trovatore), Amelia and Ulrica (Un ballo in maschera), Lucrezia Borgia and Orsini (Lucrezia Borgia), Valentina and Urbain (Les Huguenots), Norma and Adalgisa (Norma), Rachel (La Juive), Sélika (L'Africaine), Leonora (La Favorite).

Gifted with a remarkably large and strong voice, she could with equal ease sing high light soprano, soprano and even contralto parts... The performances of these roles were always characterised by great life and temperament

writes a Polish critic.

With a beautiful voice, she was a bad actress. She was, however, an excellent teacher. She placed the voices of young singers well

When she retired from the stage, she started teaching and, together with her husband, Auguste Souvestre, founded a singing school in Lviv, which they kept until 1893. Then they moved to Dresden. For a time their school was also in Lugano. They taught a range of excellent Polish and foreign singers : Matja von Niessen-Stone, Irene von Chavanne, Liesel Schuch-Ganzel.
