= Ada Sari (discography) =

Discography of soprano Ada Sari

Discography of a Polish soprano singer Ada Sari. The list includes all takes, even those unpublished. There is apparently no complete discography of this artist, only partial discographies and information at different sources.

== Gramophone [HMV], London, Hayes ==
=== 25 April 1923 ===
Accompanied by Ivor Newton (piano). Recorded on 25 April 1923.

Matrix number	Title and link to a transfer where available	Opera	Composer	Disc catalogue number	Other disc identifiers	Matrix numbers of other known unpublished takes	Language
Cc2888-1	Variations		W. A. Mozart	Test (unpublished)			German?
Cc2889-1	Queen of the Night	Die Zauberflöte	W. A. Mozart	Test (unpublished)			German?

=== 22 November 1923 ===
Accompanied by Clarence Raybould (piano). Recorded on 22 November 1923.

Matrix number	Title and link to a transfer where available	Opera	Composer	Disc catalogue number	Other disc identifiers	Matrix numbers of other known unpublished takes	Language
Bb3878-1	Rosina’s aria "Una voce poco fa", pt 1	Il Barbiere de Siviglia	G. Rossini	Test (unpublished)			Italian
Bb3879-1	Rosina’s aria "Una voce poco fa", pt 2	Il Barbiere de Siviglia	G. Rossini	Test (unpublished)			Italian

== Grammophon, Berlin ==
Recorded in Berlin.

=== 9 December 1924 ===
Orchestra accompaniment. Recorded on 9 December 1924 by Paul Richard Goile (uncredited).

Matrix number	Title and link to a transfer where available	Opera	Composer	Disc catalogue number	Other disc identifiers	Matrix numbers of other known unpublished takes	Language
1881as	Una voce poco fa	Il Barbiere de Siviglia	G. Rossini	72980	J24646 (or J24046)		Italian
1882as(?)	(unidentified aria)	Rigoletto	G. Verdi	(most probably unpublished)			Italian?
1883as(?)	(unidentified aria)	Lakmé	L. Delibes	(most probably unpublished)			Italian?
1884as	E strano!	La traviata	G. Verdi	72957	J24038, 60012 (Japan)		Italian
1885as	Follie! Follie, delirio vano	La traviata	G. Verdi	72957	J24039, 60012 (Japan)		Italian

=== 10 December 1924 ===
Orchestra accompaniment. Recorded on 10 December 1924 by Paul Richard Goile (uncredited).

Matrix number	Title and link to a transfer where available	Opera	Composer	Disc catalogue number	Other disc identifiers	Matrix numbers of other known unpublished takes	Language
1886as	Il dolce suono	Lucia di Lammermoor	G. Donizetti	72958	J24040, 60013 (Japan)		Italian
1887½as	Alfin son tua	Lucia di Lammermoor	G. Donizetti	72958	J24041	1887as	Italian
1888as	Chanson Hindoue	Sadko	N. Rimsky-Korsakov	72959	J24042		Italian
1889as	La Villanelle	-	E. dell'Acqua	72959	J24043		Italian
1890as	L'ultima scena "Un bel di vedremo"	Madama Butterfly	G. Puccini	72960	J24044		Italian
1891as	Mi chiamano Mimì	La Bohème	G. Puccini	72960	J24045		Italian

=== March 1925(?) ===
Orchestra accompaniment. Recorded by Paul Richard Goile (uncredited).

Matrix number	Title and link to a transfer where available	Opera	Composer	Disc catalogue number	Other disc identifiers	Matrix numbers of other known unpublished takes	Language
2045as	Addio del passato	La traviata	G. Verdi	72980	J24047, 60013 (Japan)		Italian
2046as	Voce di primavera	-	J. Strauss II	72981	J24049		Italian
2047as	Vissi d'arte	Tosca	G. Puccini	72981	J24048		Italian

=== 1925 or February 1926 ===
Orchestra accompaniment. Recorded in 1925 or February 1926. Released after March 1926.

Matrix number	Title and link to a transfer where available	Opera	Composer	Disc catalogue number	Other disc identifiers	Matrix numbers of other known unpublished takes	Language
947az	Ah! e strano	Faust	Ch. Gounod	73009	J24070		Italian
961½az	Nella calma	Roméo et Juliette	Ch. Gounod	73009	J24071	961az	Italian
948az	Ombra leggiera	Dinorah	G. Meyerbeer	73010	J24072		Italian
959az	Salute o cavaliere	Les Huguenots	G. Meyerbeer	73010	J24073		Italian
949½az	Regnava nel silenzio	Lucia di Lammermoor	G. Donizetti	73011	J24074	949az	Italian
950½az	Chiari, oh Dio, ben chiari	Lucia di Lammermoor	G. Donizetti	73011	J24075	950az	Italian
953az	Sono andati?	La bohème	G. Puccini	73012	J24076		Italian
958½az	Donde lieta usci	La bohème	G. Puccini	73012	J24077	958az	Italian
955½az	Variazioni. Mi parlo un di d'amor	-	A. Adam	73013	J24078	955az	Italian
965az	Nightingale's Song: Romance / Die Nachtigall: Romanze	-	A. Alyabyev	73013	R24000		Russian
956az	Caro nome	Rigoletto	G. Verdi	73014	J24079		Italian
957az	Dov'è l'indiana bruna	Lakmé	L. Delibes	73014	J24080		Italian
960az	Siccome un di	Les pêcheurs de perles	G. Bizet	73015	J24081		Italian
966az	Non conosci il bel suol	Mignon	A. Thomas	73015	J24082		Italian
967az	Ah! Non credea mirarti	La sonnambula	V. Bellini	73016	J24083		Italian
968az	Ah! Non giunge	La sonnambula	V. Bellini	73016	J24084		Italian
969az	Qui la voce sua soave	I puritani	V. Bellini	73017	J24085		Italian
970az	Vien, diletto	I puritani	V. Bellini	73017	J24086		Italian
	(unidentified aria)	Linda di Chamounix	G. Donizetti	(most probably unpublished)			Italian?

=== 1926 or 1927 ===
Orchestra accompaniment. Recorded in 1926 or 1927 by Paul Richard Goile (uncredited).

Matrix number	Title and link to a transfer where available	Opera	Composer	Disc catalogue number	Other disc identifiers	Matrix numbers of known unpublished takes	Language
62bo	Depuis le jour où je me suis donnée	Louise	G. Charpentier	73069	F24039		French
63bo	Io dico, no non son paurosa	Carmen	G. Bizet	73069	J24111		Italian
61bo	Quando me' n vo soletta per la via	La bohème	G. Puccini	73070	J24112		Italian
64bo	L'altra notte in fondo al mare	Mefistofele	A. Boito	73070	J24113		Italian
65bo	O lieto suol della Turenna	Les Huguenots	G. Meyerbeer	73071	J24114		Italian
68bo	Son vergin vezzosa	I puritani	V. Bellini	73071	J24115		Italian

== His Master's Voice, Vienna ==
=== 6 October 1928 ===
Accompanied by Otto Schulhof (piano). Recorded on 6 October 1928 by Arthur Douglas Lawrence (uncredited).

Matrix number	Title and link to a transfer where available	Composer	Disc catalogue number	Other disc identifiers	Matrix numbers of known unpublished takes	Language
Bw1874-1	Żal (Étude, op.10, no.3)	F. Chopin	AM2886	ER288 (223300)	Bw1874-2	Polish
Bw1875-1	Cudne oczy	W. Friemann	AM2886	ER288 (223301)	Bw1875-2	Polish
Bw1876-1	I fell in love, to my sorrow Op. 8, No. 4 / Полюбила я на печаль свою... (lyrics: А. Плещеев)	S. Rachmaninoff	AM2832	ER289 (7-23012)	Bw1876-2	Russian
Bw1877-1	The coming of Spring Op. 14. No. 11 / Приход весны Оп. 14 № 11	S. Rachmaninoff	AM2832	ER289 (7-23013)	Bw1877-2	Russian
Bw1878-1	Zawód	M. Karłowicz	AM2833	ER290 (223302)	Bw1878-2	Polish
Bw1879-1	Pamiętam ciche, jasne, złote dnie	M. Karłowicz	AM2833	ER290 (223303)	Bw1879-2	Polish

=== 8 October 1928 ===
Accompanied by orchestra directed by prof. Karl Alwin. Recorded on 8 October 1928 by Arthur Douglas Lawrence (uncredited).

Matrix number	Title and link to a transfer where available	Opera	Composer	Disc catalogue number	Other disc identifiers	Matrix numbers of known unpublished takes	Language
Bw1891-2	Cavatina part 1: Una voce poco fa	Il Barbiere di Siviglia	G. Rossini	AM2834	R11088 (7-53131), ER291, HN772	Bw1891-1	Italian
Bw1892-1	Cavatina part 2: Io sono docile	Il Barbiere di Siviglia	G. Rossini	AM2834	R11088 (7-53132), ER291, HN772	Bw1892-2	Italian
Cw1893-2	An der schönen blauen Donau (Strauss)	-	J. Strauss II	AN510 J.E.4 (Polish re-release)	ES459, 0943010	Cw1893-1, Cw1893-3	German
Cw1894-2	Variazioni (Adam-Mozart)	-	A. Adam / W. A. Mozart	AN510 J.E.4 (Polish re-release)	ES459, 2-053332	Cw1894-1	Italian

=== 10 June 1929 ===
Accompanied by Charles Cerné (piano). Recorded on 10 June 1929 by Frank William Rennie (uncredited).

Matrix number	Title and link to a transfer where available	Composer	Disc catalogue number	Other disc identifiers	Matrix numbers of known unpublished takes	Language
BA66-1	a) Veni Creator b) Indele i Menedele	Stanisław Niewiadomski	Unpublished		BA66-2	Polish
BA67-1	Když mne stará matka (Songs my mother taught me)	A. Dvořák	AM3553	70-1983		Czech
BA68-1	Mariä Wiegenlied	M. Reger	AM2836	AM3944 (70-673)	BA68-2, BA68-3	German
BA69-1	Serenada-pieśń (lyrics: Mary Raczynski)	J. Gall	AM2835	ER314 (70-671)	BA69-2	Polish

=== 11 June 1929 ===
Accompanied by Charles Cerné (piano). Recorded on 11 June 1929 by Frank William Rennie (uncredited).

Matrix number	Title and link to a transfer where available	Composer	Disc catalogue number	Other disc identifiers	Matrix numbers of known unpublished takes	Language
BA74-2	Otwórz Janku (lyrics: Bronisława Ostrowska)	Stanisław Niewiadomski	AM2835	ER314 (70-672)	BA74-1	Polish
BA75-2	a) The night wind (lyrics: Eugene Field) b) Prząśniczka (Spinning song)	a) R. Farley b) S. Moniuszko	AM2837	ER316 (70-676)	BA75-1	English / Polish
BA76-2	Roza i Solovey (Rose and Nightingale)	N, Rimsky-Korsakov	AM2837	ER316 (70-675)	BA76-1	Russian
BA77-1	Solovej (The Nightingale)	A. Alyabyev	AM2836	70-674	BA77-2	Russian

=== 7 March 1931 ===
Accompanied by Charles Cerné (piano). Recorded on 7 March 1931 by Douglas E. Larter and Arthur S. Clarke (uncredited).

Matrix number	Title and link to a transfer where available	Opera	Composer	Disc catalogue number	Other disc identifiers	Matrix numbers of known unpublished takes	Language
0L146-2	Колыбельная (Berceuse)	-	A. Grechaninov	AM3671	70-2057	0L146-1	Russian
0L147-1	Восточная пъсня (Chanson orientale)	-	A. Glazunov	AM3671	70-2058	0L147-2	Russian
0L148-1	a) Indele Mendele b) Veni Creator	-	Stanisław Niewiadomski	AM3572	70-1994	0L148-2	Polish
2L149-2	Ten lásky sen	Prodaná Nevěsta	B. Smetana	AN679	72-779	2L149-1	Czech
0L150-2	Chanson indoue	Sadko	N. Rimsky-Korsakov	AM3672	70-2059	0L150-1	Russian

=== 9 March 1931 ===
Accompanied by Charles Cerné (piano). Recorded on 9 March 1931 by Douglas E. Larter and Arthur S. Clarke (uncredited).

Matrix number	Title and link to a transfer where available	Opera	Composer	Disc catalogue number	Other disc identifiers	Matrix numbers of known unpublished takes	Language
2L151-2	"Mesicku na nebi"	Rusalka	A. Dvořák	AN679	72-778	2L151-1	Czech
0L152-1	O sole mio	-	E. di Capua	AM3552	70-1981	0L152-2	Italian
0L153-2	Ay, ay, ay	-	O. Pérez Freire	AM3552	70-1980	0L153-1	Spanish
0L154-1	Gdyby rannem słonkiem	Halka	S. Moniuszko	AM3572	70-1995	0L154-2	Polish
2L155-2	Frühlingsstimmen-Walzer	-	J. Strauss II	AN678	72-776	2L155-1	German
2L156-1	Teurer Name	Rigoletto	G. Verdi	AN678	72-777	2L156-2	German
0L157-2	Chant au soleil	Le Coq d’Or	N. Rimsky-Korsakov	AM3672	70-2060	0L157-1	Russian
0L158-2	Mám tě rád	-	Jan Malát	AM3553	70-1982	0L158-1	Czech

== Polish Radio, Warsaw ==
=== 29 March 1951 ===
Recital recorded at the Polish Radio with Ewa Wernikówna at the piano.

Title	Opera	Composer	Duration	Language
Tacea la notte placida (Act I, Leonora's aria)	Il trovatore	G. Verdi	4:20	Italian
D'amor sull'ali rosee (Act IV, Recitative and Leonora's aria)	Il trovatore	G. Verdi	4:20	Italian
Ah! Fors e lui che l'anima (Act I, Recitative and Violetta's aria)	La traviata	G. Verdi	6:50	Italian
Sul fil d'un soffio etesio (Act II, Nannetta's aria)	Falstaff	G. Verdi	2:40	Italian

According to Kaczyński's book, there could have been two more arias recorded: from Barbiere di Siviglia (Rossini) and from Rigoletto (Verdi), but these do not exist in the archive of the Polish Radio.

== Sources ==
1. Robert Johannesson's discography at http://78opera.com/files/ARTIST_Sa-Sc.pdf
2. Ada Sari's discography at Kelly Database hosted at The Gramophone Co. Discography: https://www.gramophonecompanydiscography.com/ (search for "Ada Sari")
3. Ada Sari's records in the collection of Poland's National Library at: https://katalogi.bn.org.pl/discovery/search?query=any,contains,Ada%20Sari&tab=LibraryCatalog&vid=48OMNIS_NLOP:48OMNIS_NLOP&facet=lds04,include,Muzyka&lang=en&offset=0
4. Bogusław Kaczyński: "Ada Sari - Kulisy wielkiej sławy" ISBN 978-83-927-4516-7, Casa Grande 2018
5. Videos featuring record label photo are preferred, allowing verification
6. Europeana, tagged Ada Sari: https://www.europeana.eu/en/collections/person/31308-ada-sari
7. Dr. Rainer E. Lotz: "Discographie der deutschen Gesangsaufnahmen" (Birgit Lotz Verlag, Bonn) - unpublished draft, with author's permission
8. List of Ada Sari's recordings in archives of the Polish Radio - unpublished, courtesy of Polish Radio.
