= Air assault =

Military movement of ground forces by air into combat or unsecured areas

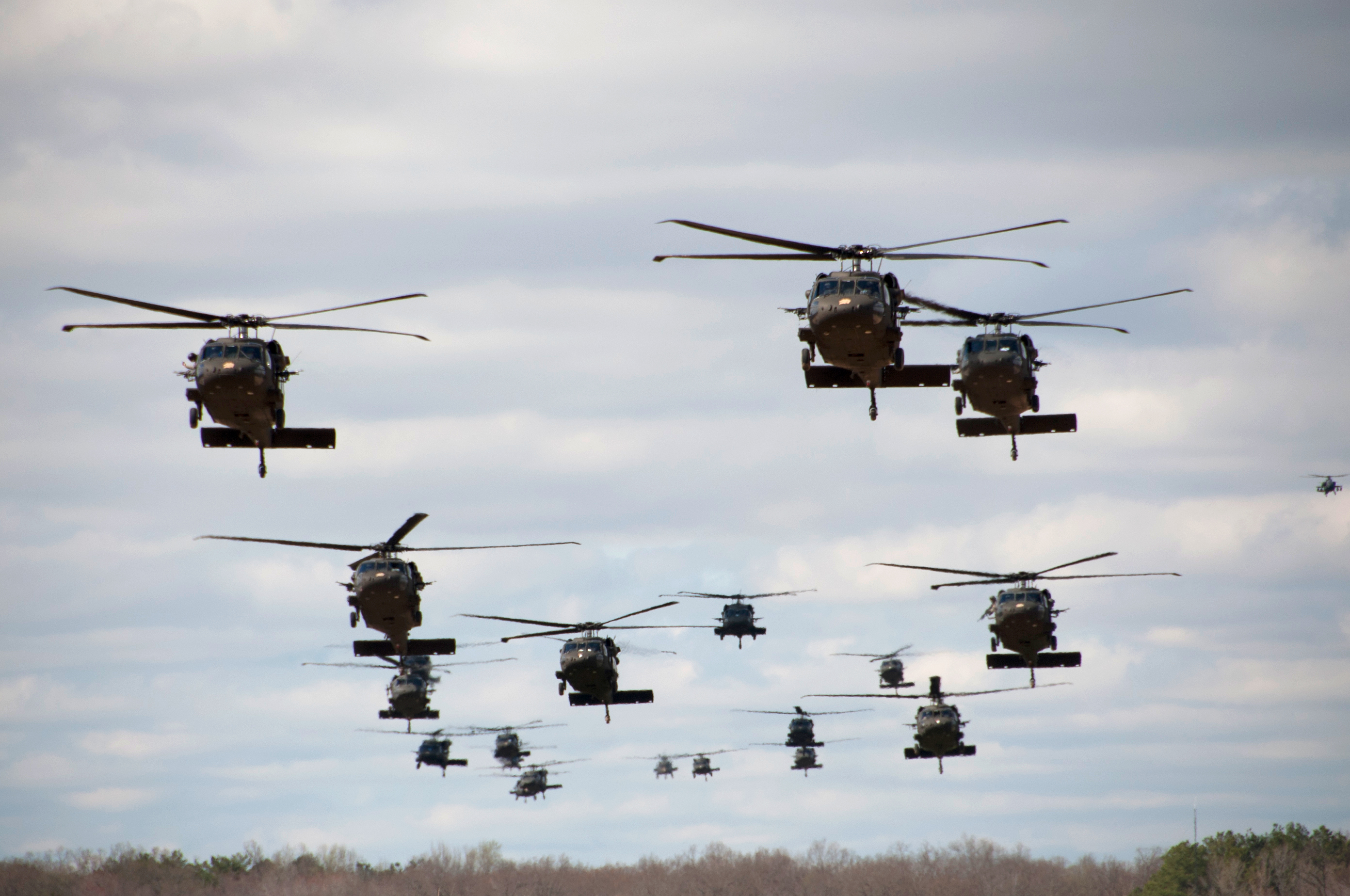
UH-60 Black Hawk helicopters transporting troops for an air assault exercise

Air assault is the movement of ground-based military forces by vertical take-off and landing (VTOL) aircraft, such as helicopters, to seize and hold key terrain that has not been fully secured, and to directly engage enemy forces behind enemy lines. In addition to regular infantry training, air-assault units usually receive training in rappelling, fast-roping techniques, and air transportation. Their equipment is sometimes designed or field-modified to allow better transportation and/or carrying within aircraft.

The United States Army field manual FM 1-02 (FM 101-5-1) describes an "air assault operation" as an operation in which assault forces (combat, combat support, and combat service support), using the firepower, mobility, and total integration of helicopter assets, maneuver on the battlefield under the control of the ground or air maneuver commander to engage and destroy enemy forces or to seize and hold key terrain usually behind enemy lines.

Due to the transport load restrictions of helicopters, air assault forces are usually light infantry, though some armored fighting vehicles, like the Soviet BMD-1 are designed to fit most heavy lift helicopters, which enable assaulting forces to combine air mobility with a certain degree of ground mechanization. Invariably the assaulting troops are highly dependent on aerial fire support provided by the attack helicopters, armed helicopters, and/or fixed-wing aircraft escorting them. A concept called mounted vertical maneuver requires the ability to transport light, motorized, or medium-weight mechanized force by VTOL or super STOL aircraft.

Air assault should not be confused with air attack, air strike, or air raid, which all refer to attack using solely aircraft (for example bombing, strafing, etc.). Moreover, air assault should not be confused with an airborne assault, which occurs when paratroopers, and their weapons and supplies, are dropped by parachute from transport aircraft, often as part of a strategic offensive operation.

== Organization and employment ==
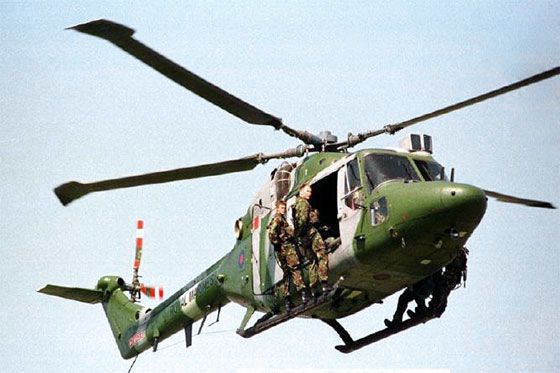
Royal Marines Commandos preparing to abseil down from a Royal Marines Lynx helicopter from 847 Naval Air Squadron (NAS), used in utility support of 3 Commando Brigade. They can also act as attack helicopters with the addition of two pods of four TOW wire-guided anti-tank missiles.

Air assault and air mobility are related concepts. However, air assault is distinctly a combat insertion rather than transportation to an area in the vicinity of combat.

Air assault units can vary in organization; using helicopters not only in transport but also as close air fire support, medical evacuation helicopters and resupply missions. Airmobile artillery is often assigned to air assault deployments. Units vary in size, but are typically company to brigade sized units.

Airmobile units are designed and trained for air insertion and vertical envelopment ("a maneuver in which troops, either air-dropped or air-landed, attack the rear and flanks of a force, in effect cutting off or encircling the force", air resupply, and if necessary air extraction.

One specific type of air assault unit is the US Army air cavalry. It differs from regular air assault units only in fulfilling a traditional cavalry reconnaissance and short raids role. Britain's 16 Air Assault Brigade was formed in 1999 following an amalgamation of elements of 5th Infantry Brigade (5 Airborne Brigade) and 24 Airmobile Brigade, bringing together the agility and reach of airborne forces with the potency of the attack helicopter. Similarly, the US 101st Airborne Division was originally classed as airborne, then airmobile and now air assault.

== History ==
Air mobility has been a key concept in offensive operations since the 1930s. Initial approaches to air mobility focused on parachutists and the use of military gliders. During World War II many assaults were done by military gliders. The World War Two era German Fallschirmjäger, Brandenburgers, and the 22nd Air Landing Division glider borne paras laid the foundation for modern day air assault operations. In 1941 the U.S. Army quickly adopted this concept of offensive operations initially utilizing wooden gliders before the development of helicopters. Following the war, faster aircraft led to the abandonment of the flimsy wooden gliders with the then new helicopters taking their place. Four YR-4B helicopters saw limited service in the China Burma India theatre with the 1st Air Commando Group

In 1943 the Germans conducted the Gran Sasso raid which implemented many aspects of the air assault concept. Another example was the German Brandenburgers' glider borne operation at Ypenburg during World War Two.

In 1946, U.S. Marine General Roy S. Geiger observed the atomic bomb tests at Bikini Atoll and instantly recognized that atomic bombs could render amphibious landings difficult because of the dense concentrations of troops, ships and material at beachheads. During this time, The Commandant of the Marine Corps, Alexander Vandegrift, convened a special board known as the Hogaboom Board. This board recommended that the USMC develop transport helicopters in order to allow a diffused attack on enemy shores. It also recommended that the USMC form an experimental helicopter squadron. HMX-1 was commissioned in 1947 with Sikorsky HO3S-1s. In 1948 the Marine Corps Schools came out with Amphibious Operations—Employment of Helicopters (Tentative), or Phib-31, which was the first US manual for helicopter airmobile operations. The Marines used the term vertical envelopment instead of air mobility or air assault. HMX-1 performed its first vertical envelopment from the deck of an aircraft carrier in an exercise in 1949.

American forces later used helicopters for support and transport to great effect during the Korean War showing that the helicopter could be a versatile and powerful military tool.

=== First helicopter air assaults ===
The first helicopter airlift and helicopter sling load mission was conducted on September 13, 1951, during the Korean War. "Operation Windmill I" was conducted by the United States Marine Corps in support of a battalion clearing the enemy from a series of ridges around a basin called "The Punchbowl." In total seven HRS-1 Marine helicopters made 28 flights that delivered 8,550 kg (18,848 pounds) of supplies and evacuated 74 seriously wounded men.

On November 5, 1956, the Royal Marines' 45 Commando performed the world's first combat helicopter insertion with air assault during an amphibious landing as part of Operation Musketeer, in Suez, Egypt. 650 marines and 23 tons of equipment were flown in ten Westland Whirlwind Mark 2s of 845 Naval Air Squadron from the deck of HMS Theseus, and six each Whirlwinds and Bristol Sycamore HC.12s and HC.14s off HMS Ocean's embarked Joint Experimental Helicopter Unit (JEHU) (Royal Air Force).

The plan was to use the helicopters to drop No. 45 Commando at Raswa, to the south of Port Said, in order to secure two vital bridges. Last-minute concerns about their vulnerability to ground fire meant that they were replaced in this role by French paratroops who conducted a daring low-level drop on 5 November, securing one of the two bridges intact. Instead No. 45 Commando was landed the following day, disembarking close to the seafront in the aftermath of the seaborne landing that had secured the area. This first-ever operational use of helicopters to land troops during an amphibious assault proved successful. With their carriers lying nine miles offshore, the marines were landed far more quickly than could have been achieved using landing craft, and without the need to get their boots wet. However ... they landed the marines in much the same place that old style landing craft would have put them.

In 1956, the United States Marine Corps executed the first Division-strength exercise of vertical envelopment when the 1st Marine Division was helicopter-lifted from converted WWII jeep carriers to landing sites at Camp Pendleton, CA, U.S. Marine Corps Base. One of the ships utilized for this exercise was the USS Thetis Bay. This exercise was the culmination of the Marines' developing strategy of vertical envelopment rather than amphibious assaults on heavily defended beaches. The maneuvers were well-covered by the media of the time, including LIFE Magazine. The Marine Corps subsequently adopted this method as standard operating procedure after proving that helicopters could be used to transport very large numbers of troops and large amounts of supplies in a timely fashion.

Operation Deep Water was a 1957 NATO naval exercise held in the Mediterranean Sea that involved the first units of the United States Marine Corps to participate in a helicopter-borne vertical envelopment operation during an overseas deployment.

During the Vietnam war the U.S. Army's 1st Cavalry Division conducted the first large scale air assault operation in combat during the Battle of Ia Drang.

=== Algerian War ===
The use of armed helicopters coupled with helicopter transport during the Algerian War for the French Army to drop troops into enemy territory gave birth to the tactics of airmobile warfare that continues today.

The machines of the French Army Light Aviation carried out a considerable number of missions against Algerian insurgents between 1955, when the Groupe d’Hélicoptères No.2 (GH 2) was created, and 1962 when the French colonial rule in Algeria finally came to an end. GH 2 was based at Sétif – Aïn Arnat in the east of the country, and it was equipped primarily with machines to undertake transport missions, though the Vertol H-21C, would soon join the unit owing to concerns about the lack of machines which could both defend themselves and carry out offensive missions against the insurgents. Acquiring these machines lay in the hands of the licensee Piasecki given France's urgent need to have them on account of the circumstances. Usually, the H-21 could carry up to 18 troops, yet local operating (as well as climatic) conditions decreed that the French army examples could carry only up to around 12 troops each. In two years, GH 2 received the vast majority of the H-21s acquired by ALAT, which consisted of five squadrons by the end of 1958. A sixth squadron from the French naval air arm, the Aéronautique navale, had operated with GH 2 for little more than a year.

From 1955 to 1962, GH 2 took part in the major battles, which occurred near the frontier between Algeria and Tunisia, including the battle of Souk-Ahras in April 1958. The helicopters, including types such as the H-21, the Alouette II, the Sikorsky H-19 and Sikorsky H-34, together aggregated over 190,000 flying hours in Algeria (over 87,000 for the H-21 alone) and helped to evacuate over 20,000 French combatants from the combat area, including nearly 2,200 at night. By the time the war in Algeria had ended, eight officers and 23 non-commissioned officers from ALAT had died in the course of their duties.

=== Vietnam War ===
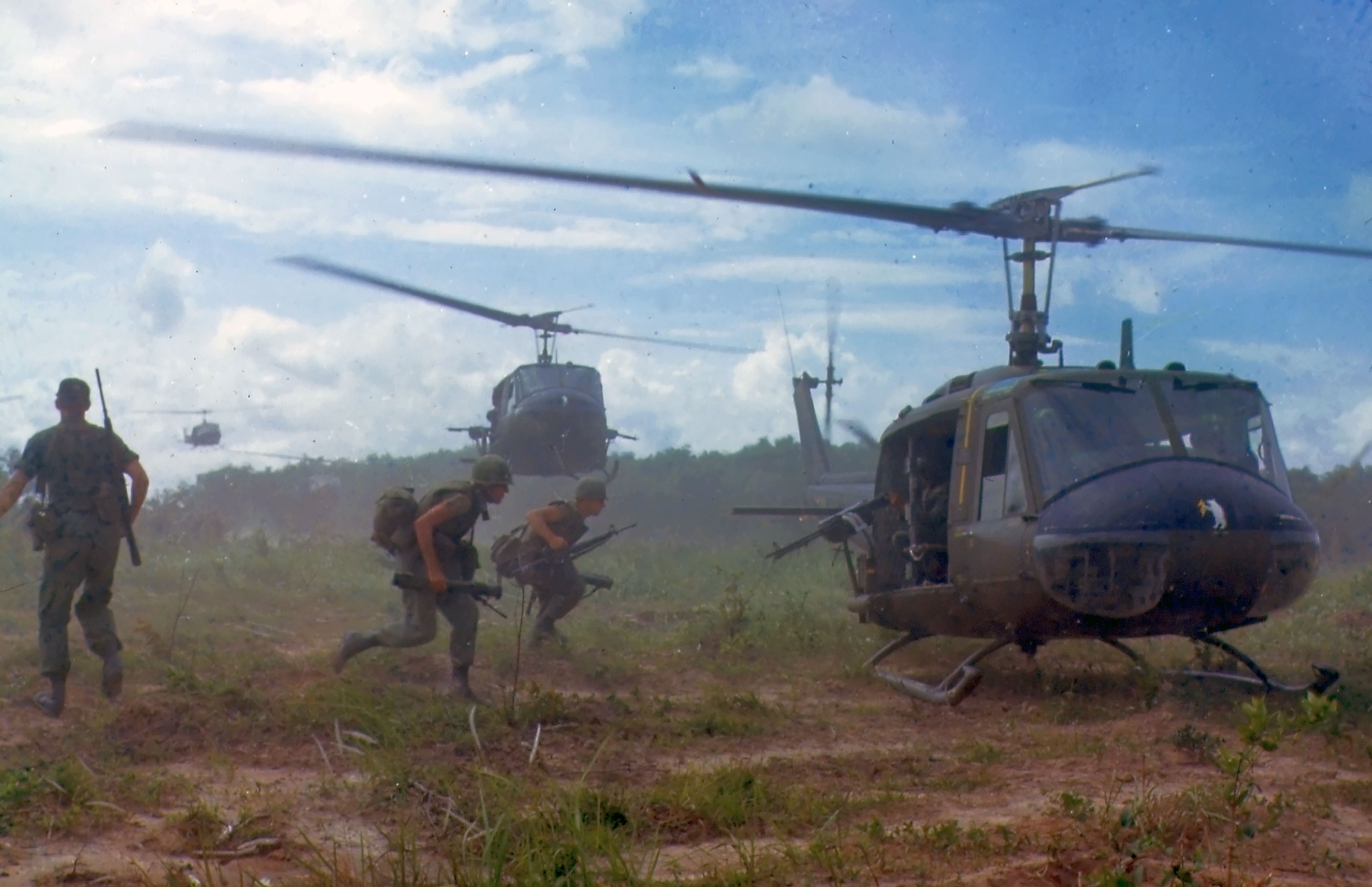
Extraction of troops after an airmobile assault during the Vietnam War.

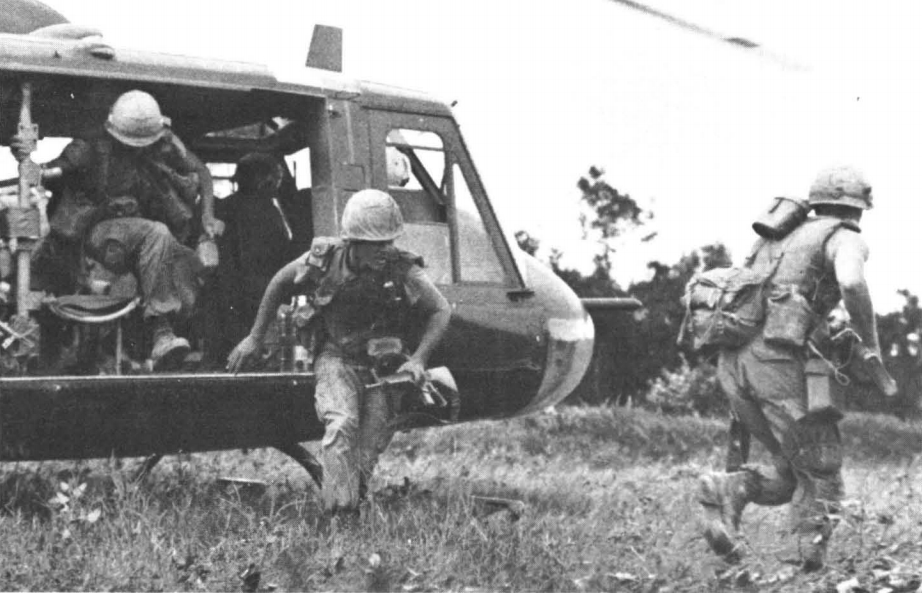
Troops dismounting a UH-1 during the Vietnam War.

U.S. Army CH-21 helicopter transports arrived in South Vietnam on 11 December 1961. Air assault operations using Army of the Republic of Vietnam (ARVN) troops began 12 days later in Operation Chopper. These were very successful at first but the Viet Cong (VC) began developing counter helicopter techniques, and at the Battle of Ap Bac in January 1963, 13 of 15 helicopters were hit and four shot down. The Army began adding machine guns and rockets to their smaller helicopters and developed the first purpose built gunship with the M-6E3 armament system.

U.S. Marine helicopter squadrons began four-month rotations through Vietnam as part of Operation SHUFLY on 15 April 1962. Six days later, they performed the first helicopter assault using U.S. Marine helicopters and ARVN troops. After April 1963, as losses began to mount, U.S. Army UH-1 Huey gunships escorted the Marine transports. The VC again used effective counter landing techniques and in Operation Sure Wind 202 on 27 April 1964, 17 of 21 helicopters were hit and three shot down.

The 2nd Battalion 3rd Marines made a night helicopter assault in the Elephant Valley south of Da Nang on 13 August 1965 shortly after Marine ground troops arrived in country. HMM-361 commanded by LtCol Tom Ross. On 17 August 1965 in Operation Starlite the 2nd Battalion 4th Marines landed in three helicopter landing zones (LZs) west of the 1st VC Regiment in the Van Tuong village complex, 12 miles (19 km) south of Chu Lai, while the 3rd Battalion 3rd Marines used seaborne landing craft on the beaches to the east. The transport helicopters were 24 UH-34s from HMM-361, HMM-261 and HMM-161 in relief, escorted by Marine and Army Hueys from VMO-2 and VMO-6 led by Maj Donald G. Radcliff, US Army who was killed in action. VC losses were 614 killed, Marine losses were 45 KIA and 203 WIA.

The need for a new type of unit became apparent to the Tactical Mobility Requirements Board (normally referred to as the Howze Board) of the U.S. Army in 1962. The Board met at a difficult time; the bulk of the military hierarchy were focused primarily on the Soviet threat to Western Europe, and perceived as requiring heavy, conventional units. The creation of new, light airmobile units could only occur at the expense of heavier units. At the same time, the incoming Kennedy administration was placing a much greater emphasis on the need to fight 'small wars', or counter-insurgencies, and was strongly supportive of officers such as General Howze who were embracing new technologies. The Board concluded that a new form of unit would be required, and commissioned tests – but justified these at the time on the need to fight a conventional war in Europe.

Initially a new experimental unit was formed at Fort Benning, Georgia, the 11th Air Assault Division on 11 February 1963, combining light infantry with integral helicopter transport and air support. Opinions vary as to the level of support for the concept within the Army; some have argued that the initial tests against the context of conventional warfare did not prove promising, and, despite opposition from the Joint Chiefs of Staff, it was primarily the Secretary of Defense Robert McNamara who pushed through the changes in 1965, drawing on support from within the Pentagon which had now begun to establish a counter-insurgency doctrine that would require just such a unit. Others have put more weight on the support of newly appointed senior Army commanders, including the new Chief of Staff General Wheeler, in driving through the changes. Nonetheless, the 11th Air Assault Division assets were merged with the co-located 2nd Infantry Division and reflagged as the 1st Cavalry Division (Airmobile), continuing the tradition of the 1st Cavalry Division. Within several months it was sent to Vietnam and the concept of air mobility became bound up with the challenges of that campaign, especially its varied terrain – the jungles, mountains, and rivers which complicated ground movement.

The first unit of the new division to see major combat was the 1st Battalion, 7th Cavalry Regiment, 1st Cavalry Division, led by Lieutenant Colonel Harold G. Moore. The 7th Cavalry was the same regiment that Custer had commanded at the ill-fated Battle of the Little Bighorn. On November 14, 1965, Moore led his troops in the first large unit engagement of the Vietnam War, which took place near the Chu Pong massif near the Vietnam-Cambodia border. It is known today as the Battle of Ia Drang Valley, and is considered to be the first large scale helicopter air assault.

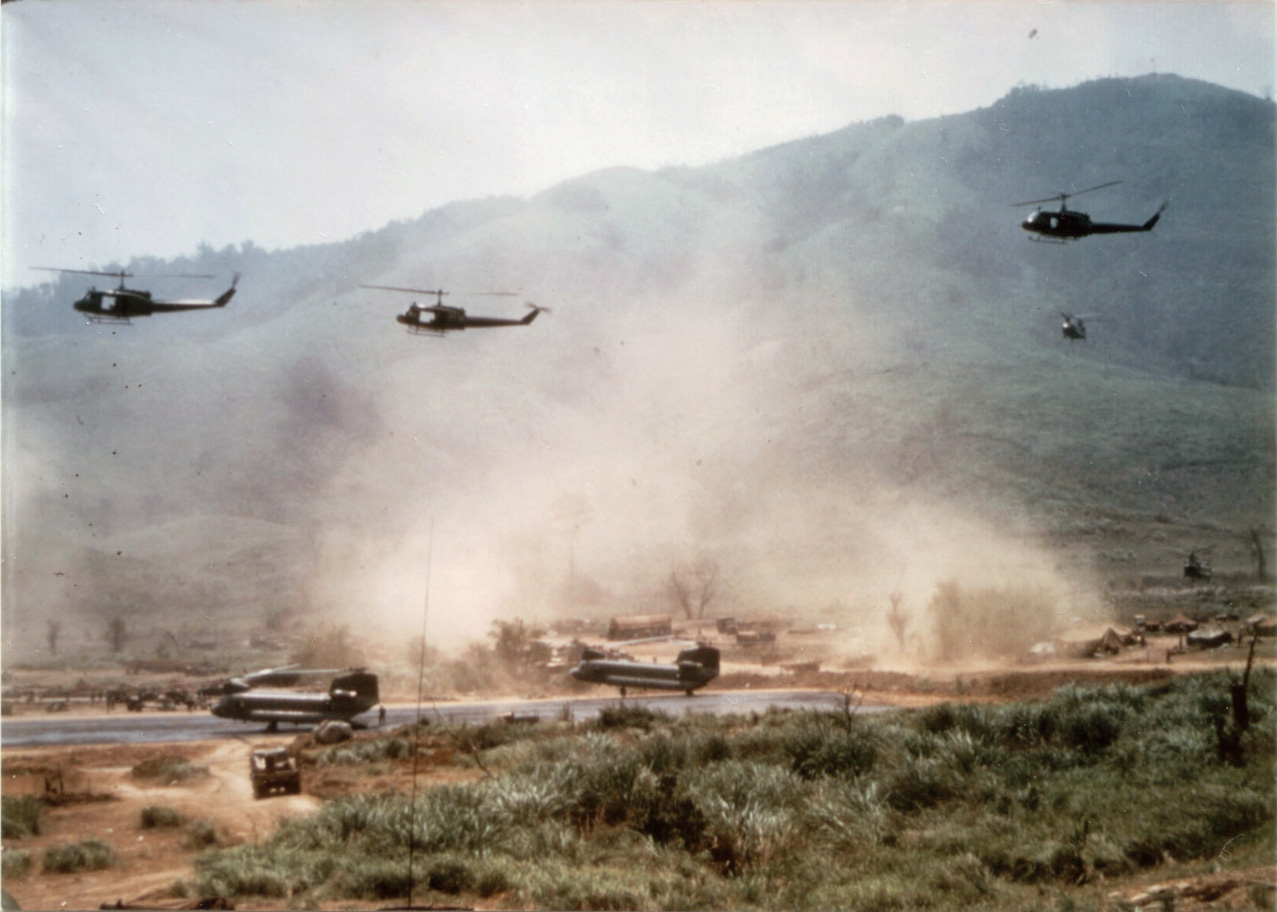
1st Cavalry Division forces at LZ Stud.

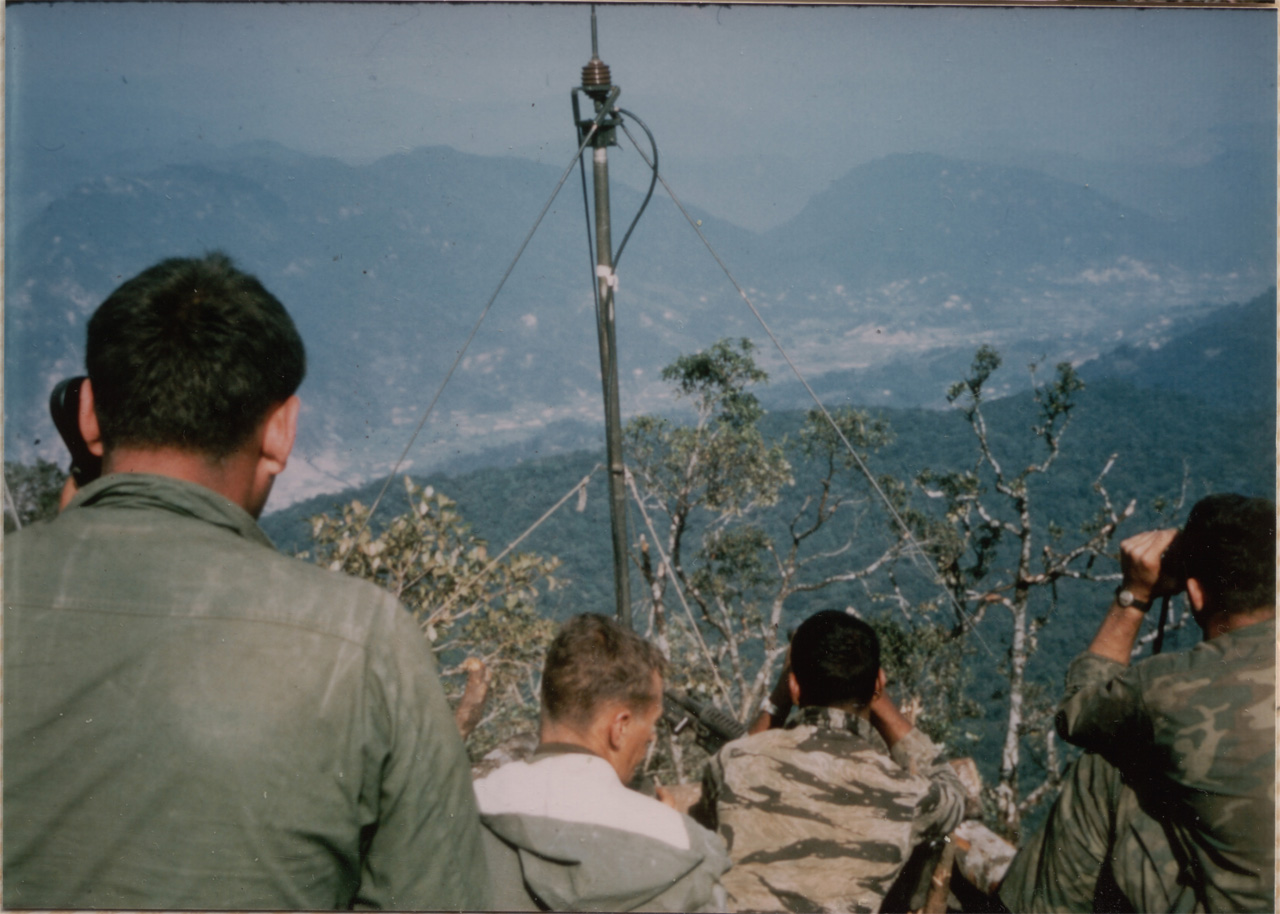
1st Cavalry Division troops directing artillery on enemy trucks in A Shau Valley.

This battalion (vice "squadron," which would have been its nomenclature had it actually been a cavalry organization) gave common currency, albeit incorrectly, to the U.S. term "Air Cavalry." However, 1-7 Cav was in actuality an infantry formation carrying a "Cavalry" designation purely for purposes of lineage and heraldry. (True air cavalry organizations are/were helicopter-mounted reconnaissance units.) Light infantry-centric organizations (battalions, brigades, or divisions) that are trained, organized, and equipped to operate with organic (i.e., owned by the joint parent headquarters of both the light infantry organization and the supporting aviation organization) are classified as "Air Assault," previously designated as "Airmobile."

The Vietnam-era 1st Cavalry Division (Airmobile) was not an "air cavalry" division, per se, although it did contain air cavalry squadrons. The division was a new concept that probably was more akin to a modern version of "mounted rifles," owing to its helicopter "mounts," and, as did 1-7 Cav discussed above, carried the "Cavalry" designation primarily for purposes of lineage and heraldry, and not because of its then current mission or organizational structure.

On a practical level, virtually any light infantry formation can instantly become "airmobile" simply by dividing the assault elements into "chalks" (aircraft load designations pertaining to order of loading and type of aircraft), embarking them on the aircraft, transporting them to the objective/assembly area, and inserting/disembarking them into a landing zone, etc. However, true "air assault" organizations are specialized light infantry (much like airborne troops), who are trained, organized, and equipped specifically to perform the complex, rapid, and dynamic tasks inherent in air assault vice simply being transported by aircraft.

=== Southern African wars ===
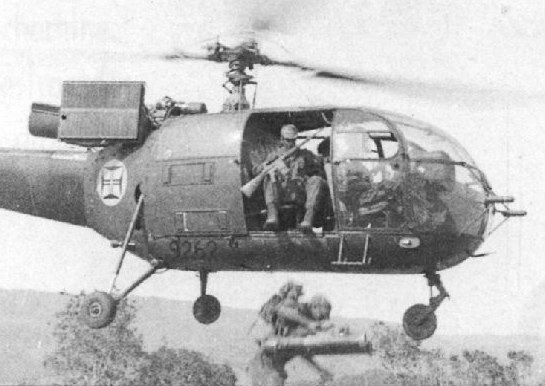
Portuguese Paratroopers jumping from an Alouette III helicopter, in an air assault in Angola, in the early 1960s.

The armed forces of Portugal, Rhodesia and South Africa widely conducted airmobile warfare operations in Southern Africa, during the Portuguese Colonial War (1961–1974), the Rhodesian Bush War (1964–1979) and the South African Border War (1966–1990). The airmobile warfare was part of the counter-insurgency actions made by the forces of the three countries against guerrilla forces in Angola, Portuguese Guinea, Rhodesia, Mozambique and South-West Africa.

The airmobile warfare tactics used by Portugal, Rhodesia and South Africa had many similar characteristics. The air forces of the three countries also used the same types of helicopters (mainly Alouette III and later, regarding Portugal and South Africa, SA 330 Puma), and there were military cooperation agreements and sharing of experience between the three powers, including the secret Alcora Exercise.

Portuguese, Rhodesian and South African airmobile tactics often involved air assaults done by small units of special forces or light infantry, transported in four or five Alouette III helicopters. Assaults were often supported by an Alouette III armed with a side-mounted 20 mm MG 151 autocannon. This helicopter was nicknamed Helicanhão (heli-cannon) by the Portuguese and K-Car by the Rhodesians. Variants of the air mobile warfare tactics used in Africa included the Rhodesian Fireforce and the Portuguese heliborne-horseborne forces cooperation.

=== Bangladesh Liberation War (1971) ===
Meghna Heli Bridge was an aerial operation of Indian and Bangladeshi allied forces during the Bangladesh Liberation War in 1971. It took place on 9 December, when the Indian Air Force airlifted the Mukti Bahini and the IV Corps of the Indian Army from Brahmanbaria to Raipura in Narsingdi over the River Meghna, bypassing the destroyed Meghna Bridge and Pakistani defences in Ashuganj.

=== Post Cold War ===
XVIII Airborne Corps air assault during Desert Storm to secure the Coalition's left flank

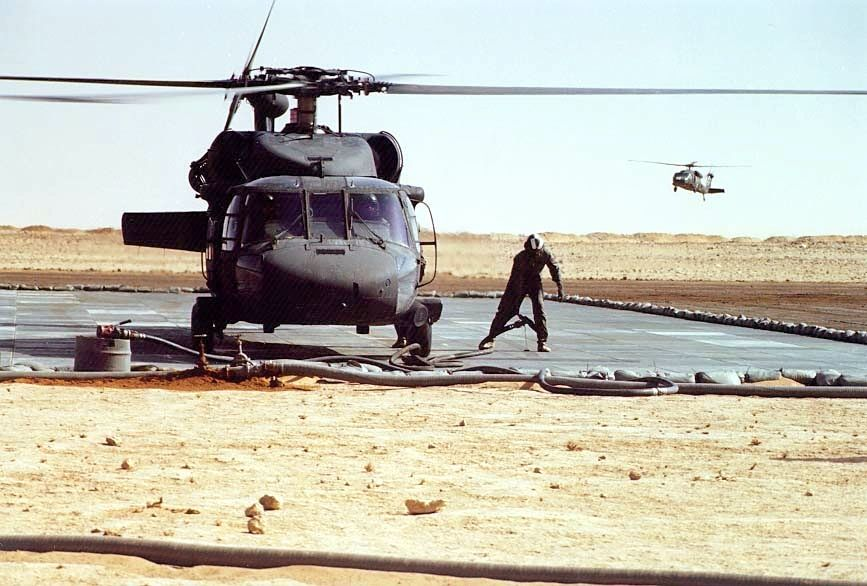
Desert Storm – 101st Airborne's Rapid Refuel Point (RRP) capable of servicing 20 helicopters simultaneously

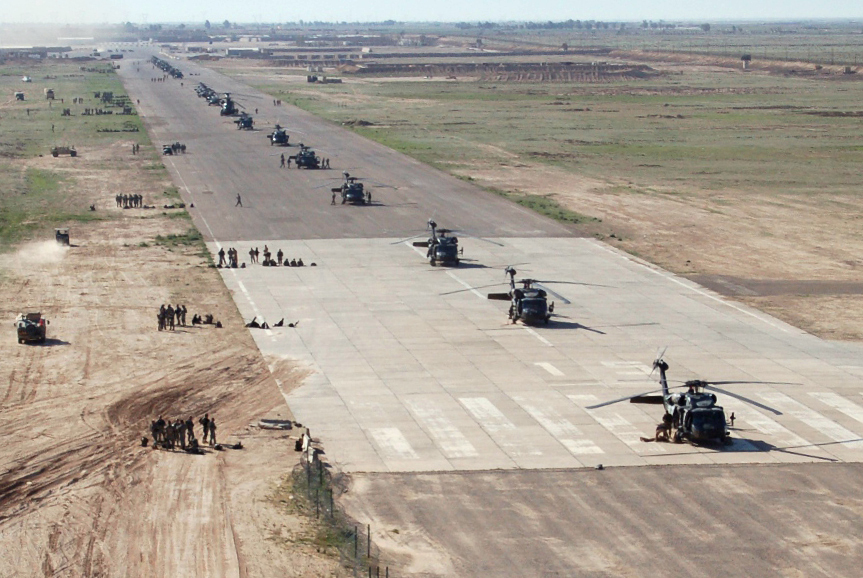
Preparations for Operation Swarmer in Iraq, 2006

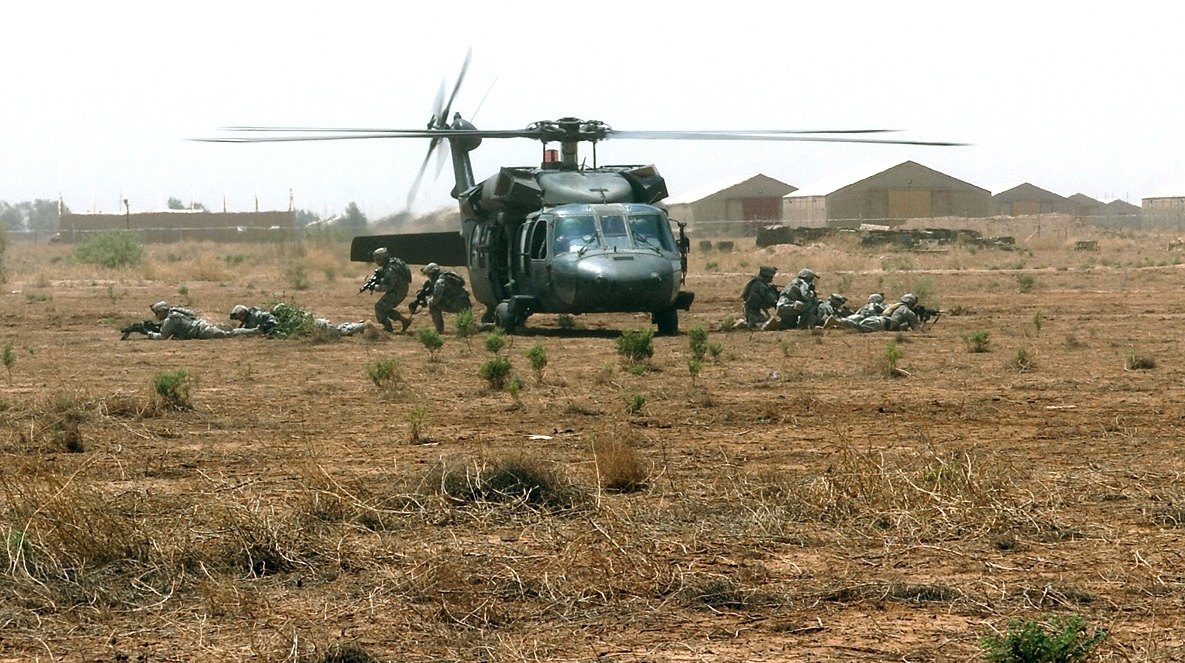
Iraq 2007

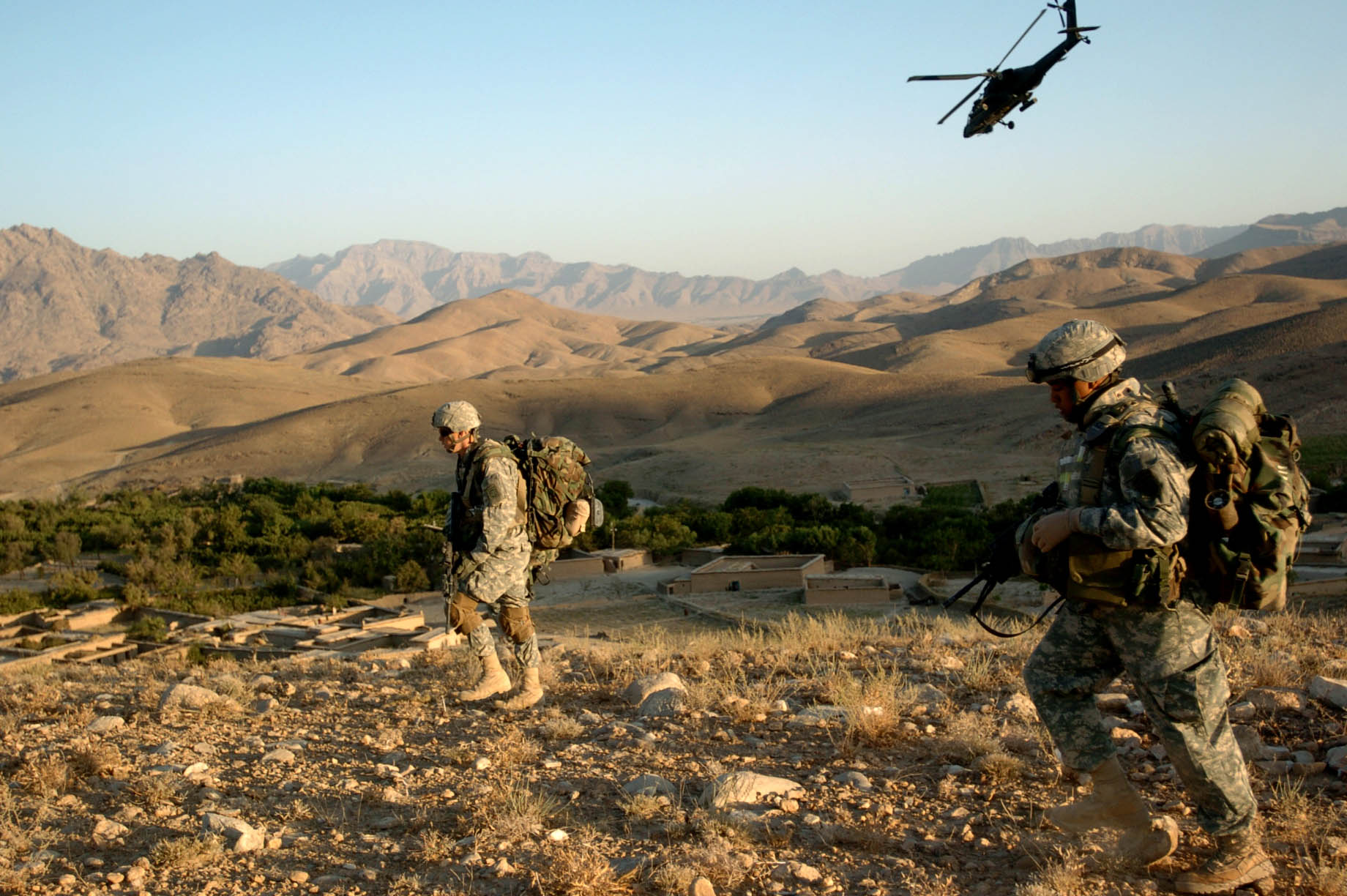
Air assault mission with Apache gunship escort

In the United States Army, the air assault mission is the primary role of the 101st Airborne Division (Air Assault). This unit is a division-sized helicopter-borne fighting force. 101st Airborne Division soldiers attend the Sabalauski Air Assault School. Graduates are qualified to insert and extract using fast rope and rappel means from a hover in addition to the ordinary walk on and off from an airlanded helicopter.

In addition, all U.S. Marine Corps divisions are capable of, and routinely train for and perform, air assault operations. Forward-deployed Marine Corps infantry battalions/regiments (reinforced, organized, and designated as Battalion Landing Teams/Regimental Combat Teams, or BLTs and RCTs, respectively), form the Ground Combat Element (GCE) of a Marine Expeditionary Unit (MEU), or Marine Expeditionary Brigade (MEB). These MEUs and MEBs are capable of embarking aboard amphibious warships and include air assault as one of several means of conducting amphibious landing operations, supported by embarked Marine Corps tilt-rotor, helicopter, and STOVL fixed-wing strike aircraft.

The 10th Mountain Division Light Infantry has a limited capability to perform air assault operations. On September 19, 1994, the 1st Brigade of the 10th Mountain Division conducted the Army's first air assault from an aircraft carrier, the USS Dwight D. Eisenhower, as part of Operation Uphold Democracy. This force consisted of 54 helicopters and almost 2,000 soldiers. This was the Army's largest operation from an aircraft carrier since the Doolittle Raid of World War II.

The 16th Air Assault Brigade of the British Army is the UK's main air assault body. It comprises units of paratroopers from the Parachute Regiment and light infantry units trained in helicopter insertion, as well as light tanks and artillery.

Britain's 3 Commando Brigade Royal Marines are also highly experienced in air assault, both for boarding ships and in land attacks.

==== Russo-Ukrainian War ====
The Battle of Antonov Airport was an operation during the opening days of the 2022 Russian invasion of Ukraine where the Russian Airborne Forces (VDV) attempted an air assault in order to capture Hostomel Airport, in order to use the airport to airlift troops and heavy equipment directly into Kyiv. The VDV was initially able to capture the airport, but without artillery or armored support they were not able to handle a counter-attack started by local Ukrainian forces. The airport was captured only on the second day by a second air assault combined with an armored push from ground troops.

A simultaneous air assault was attempted at Vasylkiv, where VDV paratroopers attempted to seize the Vasylkiv Air Base but the attack was repelled.

== List of air assault forces/units ==
Argentina

- 601 Assault Helicopter Battalion

Brazil

- 12th Light Infantry Brigade (Airmobile)

Colombia

- División de aviación asalto aéreo (DAVAA)
  - Brigada de aviación 25
  - Brigada no. 32 de aviación ejercito
  - Brigada contra el narcotrafico
  - Brigada de fuerzas especiales
  - Batallon de operaciones especiales de aviación

France

- 4th Airmobile Brigade
- 11th Parachute Brigade

Germany

- Rapid Forces Division
  - Germany Air Assault Brigade 1

Netherlands

- 11 Luchtmobiele Brigade

Greece

- 71st Airmobile Infantry Brigade
- 5th Airmobile Infantry Brigade

Iran

- 25th Takavar Brigade
- 55th Airborne Brigade
- 65th Airborne "NOHED" Brigade

Italy

- Friuli Air Assault Brigade
- Folgore Parachute Brigade

Indonesia

- Raider Infantry Battalions
- Paskhas

Japan

- 12th Brigade (Air Assault)

Kazakhstan

- Kazakh Air Assault Forces

Lebanon

- Lebanese Air Assault Regiment (Lebanon)

Malaysia

- 10th Parachute Brigade (Malaysia)

Pakistan

- Special Services Group
  - 1st Commando Battalion "Yaldram"
- Special Services Wing

Poland

- 25th Air Cavalry Brigade

Portugal

- Rapid Reaction Brigade

Romania

- 495th Paratrooper Battalion "Căpitan Ștefan Soverth"

Russia

- 7th Guards Mountain Air Assault Division
- 76th Guards Air Assault Division
- 104th Guards Air Assault Division
- 11th Guards Air Assault Brigade
- 49th Air Assault Brigade
- 83rd Guards Air Assault Brigade

South Africa

- 44 Parachute Regiment (1999 to present)
- 6 South African Infantry Battalion

China

- One brigade under each combined corps

Republic of China (Taiwan)

- ROC Army Aviation and Special Forces Command (陸軍航空特戰指揮部)
  - Special Operations Command (特戰指揮部 )
    - 1st Special Operations Battalion "Might" (特戰第一營 "威")
    - 2nd Special Operations Battalion "Dare" (特戰第二營 "敢")
    - 3rd Special Operations Battalion "Firm" (特戰第三營 "剛")
    - 4th Special Operations Battalion "Fierce" (特戰第四營 "猛")
    - 5th Special Operations Battalion "Strong" (特戰第五營 "強")
  - 601st Aviation Brigade (航空六〇一旅)
  - 602nd Aviation Brigade (航空六〇二旅)
  - Aviation Training Command (飛行訓練指揮部) - 603rd Aviation Brigade (航空六〇三旅)

Singapore

- Guards

Spain

- 7th Light (Air-transportable) Infantry Brigade

Sri Lanka

- Air Mobile Brigade
- Sri Lanka Commando Regiment

Sweden

- 31st Airborne Battalion

Syria

- 14th Special Forces Division
- 15th Special Forces Division

Thailand

- 1st Special Forces Division (1st SFD)
- Long Range Reconnaissance Patrols Company (LRRP)
- Royal Thai Navy SEALs
- RECON
- Special Operations Regiment (SOR)

Ukraine

- Ukrainian Air Assault Forces
- 95th Airmobile Brigade
- 79th Airmobile Brigade
- 80th Airmobile Regiment
- 28th Training Battalion

United Kingdom

- 16 Air Assault Brigade
- 3 Commando Brigade

United States

- 101st Airborne Division
  - 1st Brigade Combat Team
  - 2nd Brigade Combat Team
  - 3rd Brigade Combat Team

Republic of Korea

- 2nd Quick Response Division (South Korea)

== See also ==
- Airborne forces
- Battleplan (documentary TV series)
- Battle of Signal Hill
- Operation Delaware
- Paratroopers
- United States Army Air Assault School
- Company E, 52nd Infantry (LRP) (United States)
