= Arnold Rutkowski =

Polish opera singer

- Born: Łódź, Poland
- Occupation: Opera singer (tenor)
- Years active: 2005–
- Agent: Zemsky/Green

Arnold Rutkowski is a Polish opera singer who has sung leading tenor roles both in his native country and abroad. He is best known for his performances as Don Josè in Carmen, Rodolfo in La bohème, Alfredo Germont in La traviata, the Duke of Mantua in Rigoletto, and Lt. Pinkerton in Madama Butterfly.

== Biography and career ==
Rutkowski was born in Łódź where he received his vocal education the city's Music Academy (1999-2005). While still a student, he made his professional debut as Ferrando in Mozart's Così fan tutte at the Rønne Theater in Bornholm, Denmark and after graduation sang in Verdi's Un giorno di regno at St. Moritz. From 2006 to 2008 he broadened his repertoire of leading tenor roles in performances at Wrocław Opera House and the Grand Theatre, Warsaw as Rodolfo (La bohème), Duke of Mantua (Rigoletto), Don José (Carmen), Alfredo Germont (La traviata), and Stefan (The Haunted Manor).

Following his Italian debut at the Teatro Comunale Modena in 2009, returned to Italy for performances at the Teatro Comunale in Ferrara and Teatro Alighieri in Ravenna that same year. He was auditioned in Paris by Plácido Domingo who invited him to perform at his 2009 his concert in Łódź and to enter Operalia, The World Opera Competition where he won the CulturArte Prize. 2009 also saw performances as Don José at the Centro de Bellas Artes Luis A. Ferré in San Juan, Puerto Rico and with Phoenix Opera in the United States. Rutkowski made his German debut in 2010 singing at the Wiesbaden Opera House as the Duke in a Rigoletto Gala. He returned to Germany in 2011 to perform at the Rheingau Music Festival's Grosse Operngala broadcast by Bayerischer Rundfunk. He performed as Pinkerton in Madama Butterfly with the Deutsche Oper am Rhein in Düsseldorf. In the 2010 and 2011 seasons he returned to Düsseldorf as well as making several house debuts, including the Michigan Opera Theatre (as the Duke in Rigoletto) Staasoper Oper in Berlin, Finnish National Opera (as Rodolfo in La bohème), the Royal Swedish Opera (as Alfredo Germont in La traviata), Staatsoper Unter den Linden in Berlin (as Alfredo Germont), and the Hamburg State Opera (as the Duke of Mantua). He also performed at the Szeged Open-Air Festival in Hungary.

In 2012 he returned to the Staatsoper Unter den Linden as Lensky on Tchaikovsky's Eugene Onegin and sang The Duke of Mantua in performances of Rigoletto at the Tchaikovsky Concert Hall in Moscow.

== Awards ==
In 2009 Rutkowski won the Jan Kiepura Vocal Competition, the Prize CulturArte - Bertita & Guillermo Martinez at the 2009 Operalia competition, and the Viennese Public Prize for "Best Singer" at the Klassikmania Competition in Vienna.

== Repertoire ==
Rutkowski's performances include:

- Don José in Carmen – Teatro Comunale Modena (2009), Teatro Comunale di Ferrara (2009), Phoenix Opera (2009), Kraków Opera (2010, 2011), Deutsche Oper am Rhein (2011), Vienna Volksoper (2011)
- Stefan in The Haunted Manor – Polish National Opera (2009, 2010)
- Pinkerton in Madama Butterfly – Kraków Opera (2009, 2010, 2011) Baltic State Opera (2010), Deutsche Oper am Rhein (2010, 2011) Poznań (2011)
- Rodolfo in La bohème – Finnish National Opera (2010, 2011), Royal Swedish Opera (2011, 2012)
- Alfredo Germont in La traviata – Staatsoper Unter den Linden (2011), Polish National Opera (2011)
- Duke of Mantua in Rigoletto – Polish National Opera (2011), Hamburg State Opera (2011, 2012), Michigan Opera Theatre (2011)
- Lensky in Eugene Onegin – Staatsoper Unter den Linden (2012)
