= Etelka Gerster =

Hungarian soprano (1855–1920)

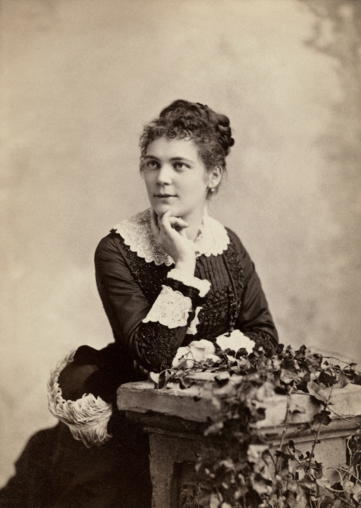
- Gerster in the 1880s
- Born: 25 June 1855; Košice, Hungary
- Died: 20 August 1920; Pontecchio, Italy
- Occupation: Operatic soprano

Etelka Gerster (25 June 1855, Košice – 20 August 1920, Pontecchio) was a Hungarian soprano. She studied with Mathilde Marchesi at the Vienna Conservatory, and made her debut at the La Fenice in Venice with great success as Gilda in Verdi's Rigoletto (January 1876). In 1876/77, she had her first successes at Marseille and Genova. In 1877 she was at Berlin with an Italian Opera company that brought forth much sensation at the Kroll Oper. Her older sister, the soprano Bertha Krause-Gerster (1852-1885) was also a member of this company.

The following year, she married her director Pietro Gardini, and after a tour of Europe visited the United States, singing at the Academy of Music, New York, in 1878, 1883 and 1887. In 1877, she came to London and was so successful as Amina in Bellini's La sonnambula, that in the following years and towards the end of her career in 1890, she returned many times to London (Her Majesty's Theatre and Covent Garden) to give glittering performances. From 1878 to 1887 she performed mainly in North America with the Mapleson Opera Company, that undertook extensive tours through the US. There was great rivalry between Gerster and Adelina Patti, and the American public took part in this battle. Gerster lost her voice soon after her first child was born. In 1889, she returned to Berlin and opened a singing school, which gained general acceptance and where she taught until 1917.

In 1890, when she reappeared in London, her vocal powers became suddenly impaired, and she retired from public life. She set up a singing school in Berlin which had Lotte Lehmann as one of her pupils. Gerster was one of the favorite prima donnas at the old Academy of Music. It is said that she had a voice of exquisite beauty and was an artist of extraordinary vocal and dramatic genius.

From 1896 until 1917, she taught singing in Berlin. Among her students were Ilona Durigo, Therese Schnabel, Matja von Niessen-Stone, and Dutch contralto Julia Culp (1880-1970).

Her daughter married Fritz Reiner.

== Sources ==
- Enciklopedia Slovenska. II. zväzok. Bratislava, 1978. VEDA
- Seeger, Horst: Opernlexikon. 3. ... überarb. ... Aufl. Berlin, 1986. Henschelverlag. ISBN 3362000142
