= The Haunted Manor (opera) =

Opera in 4 acts by Stanisław Moniuszko

- Opera by Stanisław Moniuszko
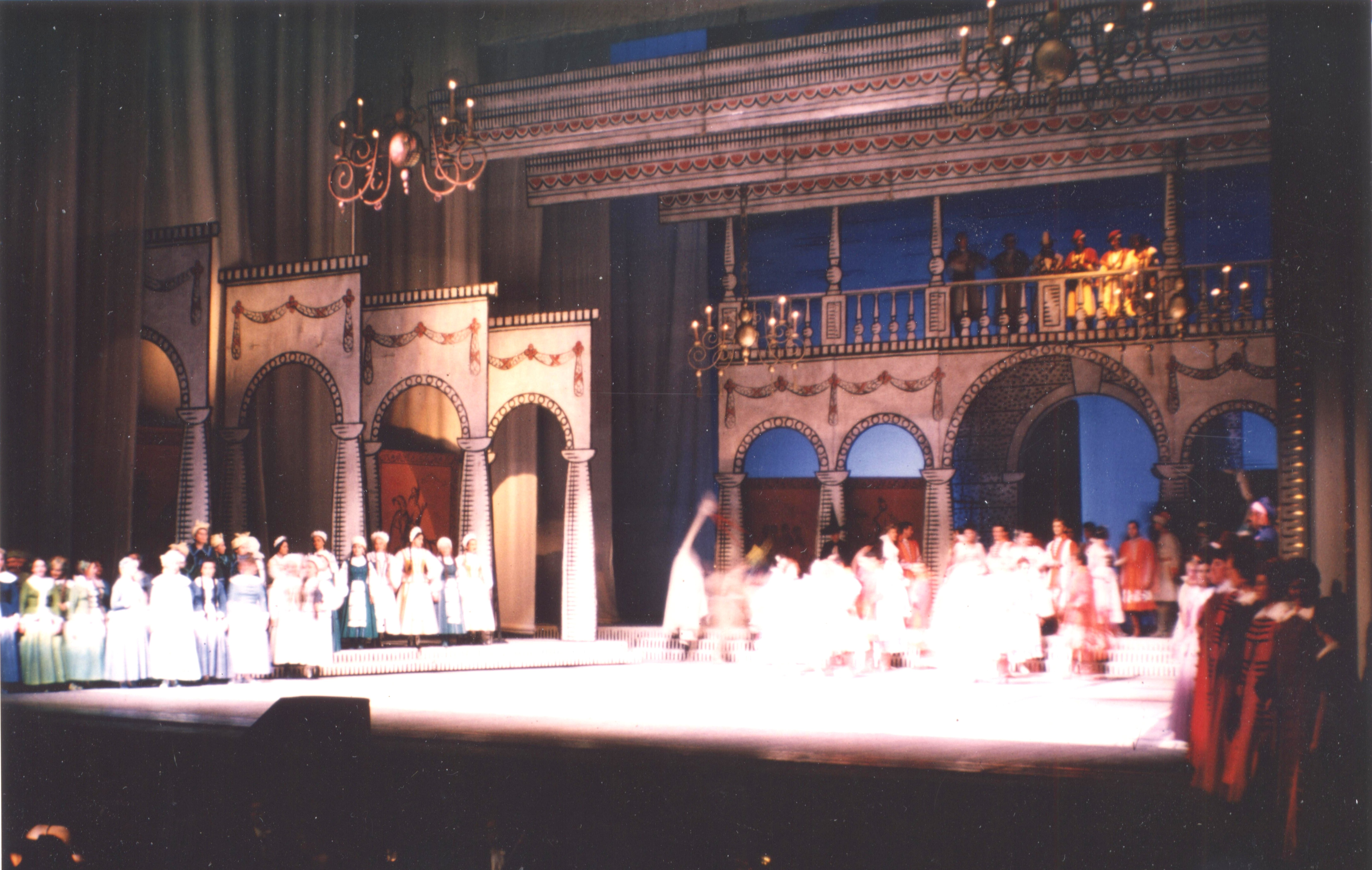
- A production at the Grand Theatre, Warsaw, on 22 September 1966
- Native title: Straszny dwór
- Librettist: Jan Chęciński
- Language: Polish
- Premiere: 28 September 1865; Teatr Wielki, Warsaw

The Haunted Manor (Polish: Straszny dwór) is an opera in four acts composed by Polish composer Stanisław Moniuszko in 1861–1864. The libretto was written by Jan Chęciński. Despite being a romance and a comedy, it has strong Polish patriotic undertones, which made it both popular with the Polish public and unpopular – to the point of being banned – by the Russian authorities of Congress Poland.

It is considered Moniuszko's best opera and the greatest 19th-century Polish opera score. However, it is mostly unknown outside Poland.

== Background and reception ==
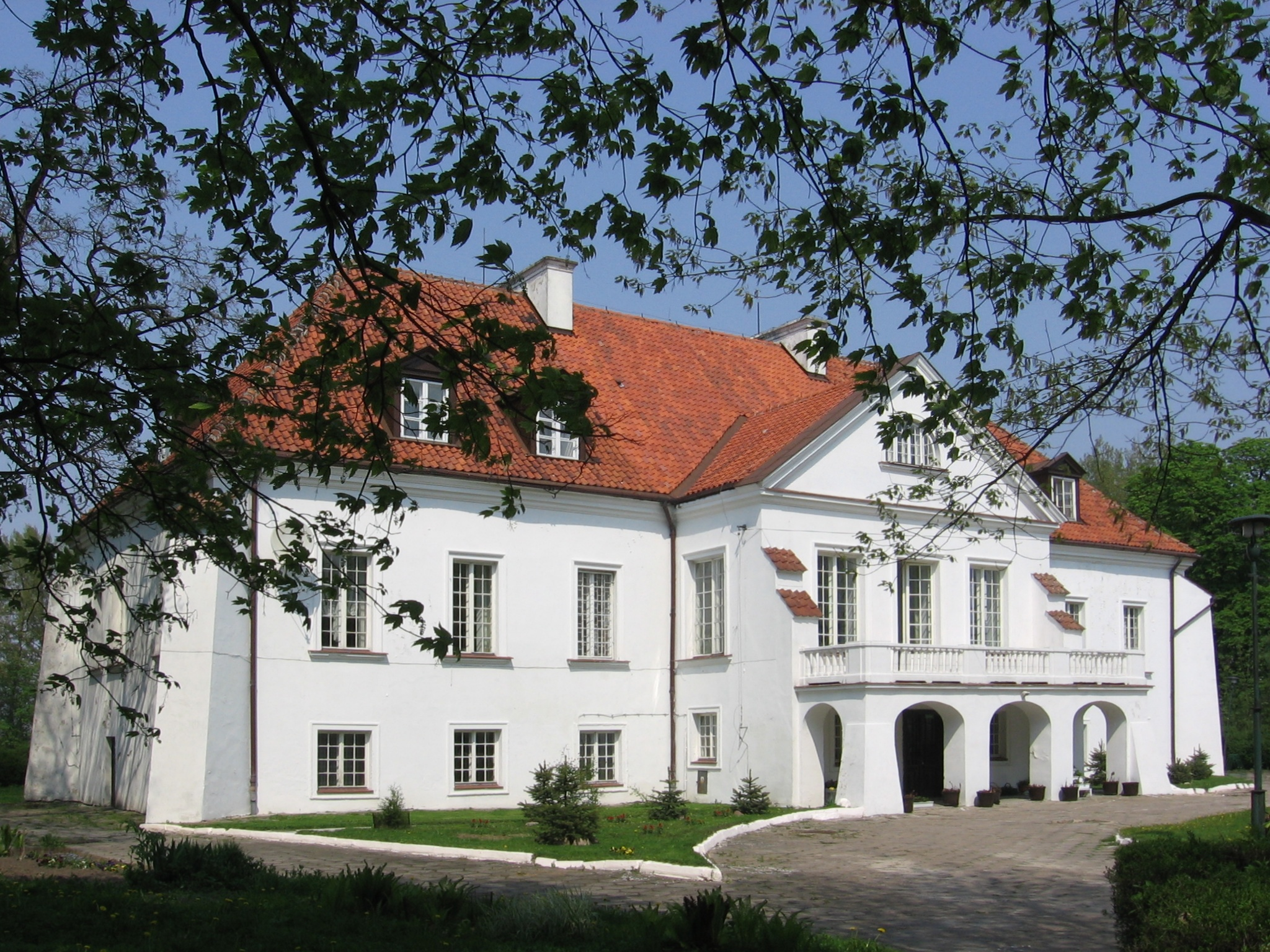
Manor house in Kalinowa, the probable original location for the setting of The Haunted Manor

The story represents both an idyllic view of life in a Polish country manor house, and at the same time an idealistic preoccupation with the patriotic duties of the soldier, the military virtues of courage, bravery, and readiness to take up arms against any enemy of the nation, and the importance of family honor. It presents in its opening scenes the obvious conflict between those patriotic aspirations on the one hand, and every man's desire for a quiet home life, love and marriage, on the other.

The opera is one of the most popular opera scores in Poland, praised for its harmonies, construction of group scenes, instrumentation, dramatic style, integration of Polish songs and dances (mazurkas, polonaises, varsoviennes, polkas and krakowiaks), and Polish atmosphere.

== Performance history ==
The Haunted Manor was first performed in Warsaw's Grand Theatre, on 28 September 1865, and received only two more performances before being banned by the tsarist authorities of Congress Poland. The Polish patriotic undertones of this piece were deemed dangerous, particularly as the January Uprising had ended only two and a half years earlier. Moniuszko lived until 1872 but the opera, considered his best and most original, was never performed again in his lifetime.

An English language version of The Haunted Manor was created in 1970 by translator Dr. George Conrad working with opera singer and singing teacher Mollie Petrie. The world premiere of this English version was given by the University of Bristol Operatic Society in 1970, which caused some excitement in the Polish expatriate community in England. Many Polish émigrés travelled to Bristol to attend the amateur production by university students. That English version has been performed a number of times in England since 1970, including in an acclaimed production by Opera South (formerly Opera Omnibus) in February 2001.

In October 1982, Michigan Opera Theater in Detroit under the leadership of founder David DiChiera mounted what was proclaimed the American premiere of the opera under the title of The Haunted Castle with the support of the local Polish community. The translation was by Sally Williams-Haik, whose husband, Wojciech Haik, directed; the production was conducted by Jacek Kasprzyk.

In April 2009, a new English translation by Donald Pippin, funded by the National Endowment of the Arts, was presented by Pocket Opera in San Francisco.

== Roles ==
Role	Voice type	Premiere cast, 28 September 1865 (Conductor: Stanislaw Moniuszko)
Miecznik, The sword-bearer	baritone	Adolf Kozieradski
Hanna, Miecznik's daughter and sister of Jadwiga	soprano	Bronislawa Dowiadowska-Klimowiczowa
Jadwiga, Miecznik's daughter and sister of Hanna	mezzo-soprano	Józefa Chodowiecka-Hessowna
Stefan, a hussar and brother of Zbigniew	tenor	Julián Dobrski
Zbigniew, a hussar and brother of Stefan	bass	Wilhelm Troszel
Cześnikowa, aunt of Stefan and Zbigniew	contralto	Honorata Majeranowska
Maciej, servant of Cześnikowa and her family	baritone	Ján Koehler
Skołuba, Miecznik's head servant and gatekeeper	bass	Józef Prohaska
Pan Damazy, a foppish barrister	tenor	Józef Szczepkowski
Marta, a housekeeper	mezzo-soprano	
Grześ, a farm hand	baritone	
Old woman	mezzo-soprano	
Chłopiec, a house-boy	speaking role	

== Synopsis ==
=== Act I ===
The two brothers Stefan and Zbigniew and their servant Maciej are returning home from war. While enjoying a parting drink with their comrades, the brothers swear to remain single and to live in a household free of women, in order to be ready to lay down their lives for their country when needed. "For if I married a lovely woman, how could I leave her to go to war?"

On arriving at the family home, the brothers are given the traditional welcoming offering of bread and salt, and they look forward to a life of peace and tranquillity. Their dream is soon shattered by the arrival of their aunt Cześnikowa, who immediately unveils her plans to marry them off to two girls she has chosen for them. The brothers explain their vow, and inform her that they are off to visit an old friend of their father's, Miecznik, (the "sword bearer") to collect money due to them.

Miecznik lives in a manor at Kalinowa, and he has two daughters with whom Cześnikowa is sure the brothers will fall in love, contrary to her own plans. She tries to put them off their visit by telling them that the manor is haunted.

=== Act II ===
It is New Year's Eve and, inside the "haunted" manor, Miecznik's daughters Hanna and Jadwiga are preparing for the customary fortune-telling to determine who will be their future husbands. Wax is melted, and they see the shapes of soldiers' helmets, pikes and chargers. Hanna is being courted by a foppish barrister, Damazy, who insists that he can see his wig and tail coat in the wax. Miecznik looks on indulgently and then explains to the assembled crowd that the type of husband he seeks for his daughters is brave, a soldier and a patriot, mindful of customs and traditions – a description that Damazy does not measure up to.

Cześnikowa arrives in advance of Stefan and Zbigniew, with the intention of portraying them as cowards in order to put Miecznik and his daughters off. At that moment, a hunting party led by Skołuba bursts in, and a heated debate concerning the killing of a boar ensues. Skołuba is adamant that he killed it, but it transpires that two strangers and their servant were seen at the time of the shooting and that one of the strangers actually shot the boar. Stefan and Zbigniew arrive with Maciej, and the two sisters decide to test out what Cześnikowa has told them by playing a trick on the brothers. Damazy, anxious to eliminate his potential rivals, has the same idea and involves Skołuba, who had hoped to take credit for killing the boar and now resents the brothers' presence, in his plan.

=== Act III ===
During the evening, the visitors retire for the night. After the brothers go in one room and Maciej goes in another, Skołuba points out two life-size portraits of fine ladies, and a clock, all of which have magic properties. In an aria with a splendid triple-time melody, Skołuba manages to scare Maciej out of his wits, causing Maciej to leave him alone.

Stefan and Zbigniew arrive and merely laugh at Maciej's superstitious fears. Zbigniew takes Maciej off to sleep, leaving Stefan alone. The clock mysteriously chimes and Stefan is reminded of his mother. Zbigniew, unable to sleep, joins him and the brothers admit to each other that they have fallen in love with Hanna and Jadwiga, despite their vows. They are completely unaware that the two girls are hiding behind the portraits, and that Damazy is in the clock. They decide to investigate the source of the strange sounds they hear. Damazy comes out from his hiding place and, to save his skin, invents a story (told to another fine tune) that the house is known as the 'Haunted Manor' as a result of its having been built with the proceeds of some infamous acts. The rather moralistic brothers decide they cannot stay, and make plans to leave straight away.

=== Act IV ===
Discovering the boys about to leave, Miecznik believes them to be cowards after all; but Maciej repeats Damazy's story. Miecznik is about to reveal the truth about his house when a party of revellers and dancers burst into the house, one of whom is Damazy in disguise. When confronted, Damazy explains that he is in love with Hanna, and leaves hurriedly.

Miecznik then explains that his great-grandfather had nine beautiful daughters and that every man who came to the manor would propose to one of them. Envious mothers with unmarried daughters who lived nearby grew to refer to the manor as "haunted" as it obviously had magic powers. Stefan and Zbigniew apologise for their suspicions, and declare their love for Hanna and Jadwiga. Miecznik gives his blessing to weddings between his daughters and the brothers. Everyone is happy – except for the schemers Cześnikowa, Damazy, and Skołuba.

== Recordings ==
- 1953-54 Marian Woźniczko (Miecznik), Barbara Kostrzewska (Hanna), Felicja Kurowiak (Jadwiga), Radzisław Peter (Damazy), Bogdan Paprocki (Stefan), Edmund Kossowski (Zbigniew), Antonina Kawecka (Cześnikowa), Zygmunt Mariański (Maciej), Henryk Łukaszek (Skołuba); Poznań State Moniuszko Chorus & Orchestra; Walerian Bierdiajew, conductor. CD: Naxos/Cat: 8.111391-2
- 1965 Andrzej Hiolski (Miecznik), Halina Słonicka (Hanna), Krystyna Szczepańska (Jadwiga), Zdzisław Nikodem (Damazy), Bogdan Paprocki (Stefan), Edmund Kossowski (Zbigniew), Bożena Brun-Barańska (Cześnikowa), Bernard Ładysz (Skołuba); Choir & Orchestra of the Warsaw State Opera; Witold Rowicki, conductor. CD: Polskie Nagrania/Cat: PNCD 093 A-D (Highlights)
- 1978 Andrzej Hiolski (Miecznik), Bożena Betley-Sieradzka (Hanna), Wiera Baniewicz (Jadwiga), Zdzisław Nikodem (Damazy), Wiesław Ochman (Stefan), Leonard Mróz (Zbigniew), Aleksandra Imalska (Cześnikowa), Florian Skulski (Maciej), Andrzej Saciuk (Skołuba); Choir & Orchestra of the Polish Radio and Television in Cracow; Jan Krenz, conductor. CD: Polskie Nagrania/Cat: PNCD 610 A-D
- 2001 Adam Kruszewski (Miecznik), Iwona Hossa (Hanna), Anna Lubańska (Jadwiga), Krzysztof Szmyt (Damazy), Dariusz Stachura (Stefan), Piotr Nowacki (Zbigniew), Stefania Toczyska (Cześnikowa), Zbigniew Macias (Maciej), Romuald Tesarowicz (Skołuba); The Polish National Opera, Warsaw; Jacek Kaspszyk, conductor. CD: EMI Classics/Cat: PM 613
- 2018 Leszek Skrla (Miecznik), Anna Fabrello (Hanna), Karolina Sikora (Jadwiga), Ryszard Minkiewicz (Damazy), Paweł Skałuba (Stefan), Stanisław Daniel Kotliński (Zbigniew), Stefania Toczyska (Cześnikowa), Krzysztof Bobrzecki (Maciej), Piotr Lempa (Skołuba); The Choirs & Symphony Orchestra of the Stanisław Moniuszko Academy of Music in Gdańsk; Zygmunt Rychert, conductor. CD: Dux/Cat: DUX 1500/1501
- 2019 Tomasz Konieczny (Miecznik), Edyta Piasecka (Hanna), Monika Ledzion-Porczyńska (Jadwiga), Karol Kozłowski (Damazy), Arnold Rutkowski (Stefan), Mariusz Godlewski (Zbigniew), Małgorzata Walewska (Cześnikowa), Marcin Bronikowski (Maciej), Rafał Siwek (Skołuba); Podlaskie Opera and Philharmonic Choir & Orchestra of the 18th Century; Grzegorz Nowak, conductor. CD: Frederick Chopin Institute/Cat: NIFCCD084

== Film ==
A Polish film adaptation under the same title was directed by Leonard Buczkowski in 1936.
