= Edyta Piasecka =

Polish dramatic coloratura soprano

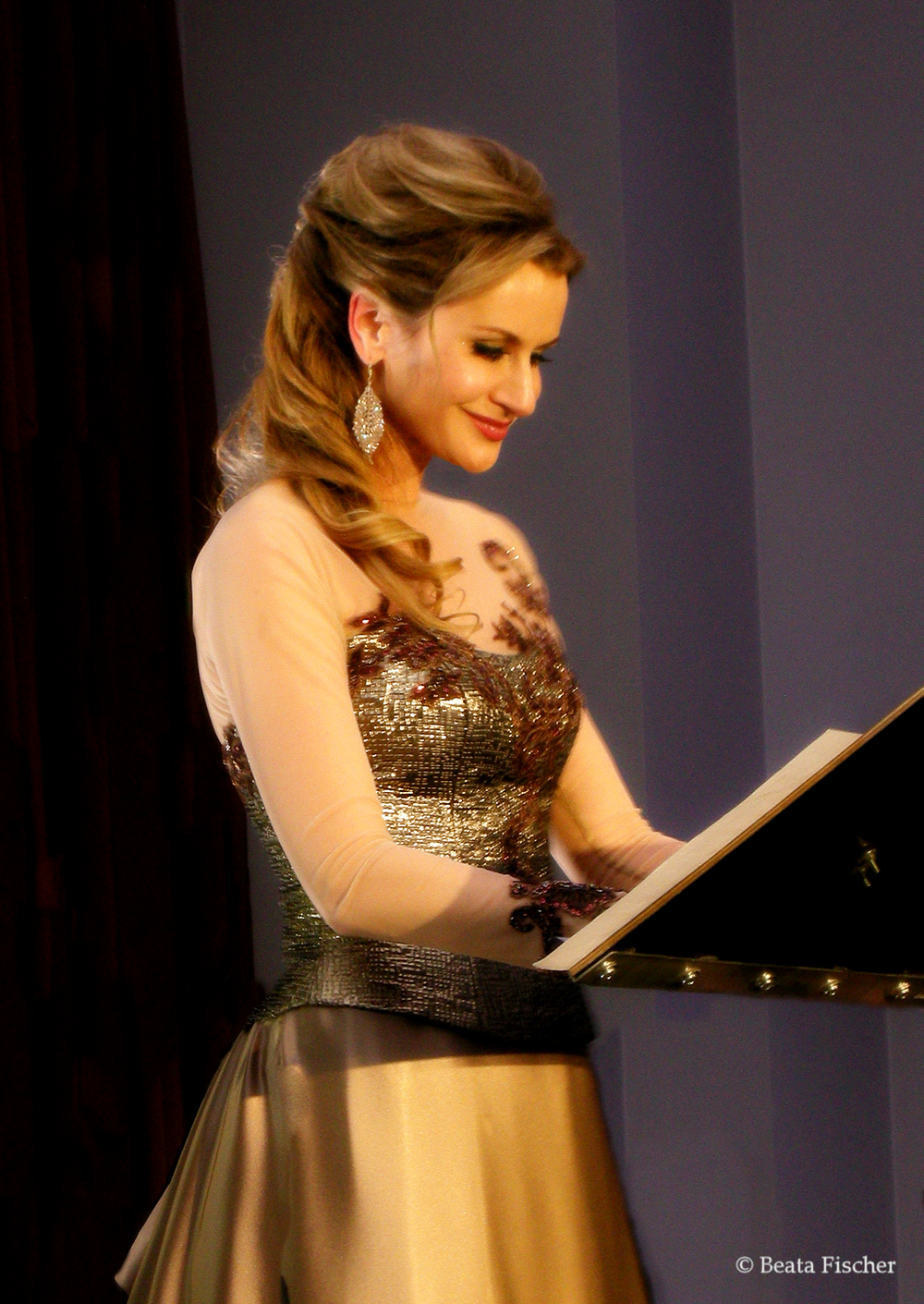
- Piasecka in 2016
- Born: Poland
- Education: Academy of Music in Kraków
- Occupation: Opera singer (soprano)
- Website: www.piasecka.pl

Edyta Piasecka, is a Polish soprano. She has been a resident artist at Opera Krakowska since 2002; a position she remains in as of 2024.

== Biography ==
Edyta Piasecka was born in Kraków, Poland. She graduated from the Academy of Music in Kraków.

She participated in a range of master classes, including, a. o. the Internationale Bachakademie Stuttgart with Anna Reynolds, and courses led by Antonina Kawecka, Christian Elsner, Ryszard Karczykowski and Izabela Kłosińska.

She made her debut at the Kraków Opera, singing the Queen of the Night in Mozart's The Magic Flute (while still a student). She became a soloist with the Kraków Opera in 1999, when she sang Rosina in Rossini's The Barber of Seville, Nedda in Leoncavallo's Pagliacci, Hanna in Moniuszko's The Haunted Manor, Lucia in Donizetti's Lucia di Lammermoor, Coraline in Adolphe Adam's Le toréador, Violetta in Verdi's La traviata, Gilda in Verdi's Rigoletto, Fiordiligi in Mozart's Così fan tutte and Rosalinda in J. Strauss's Die Fledermaus.

She made her debut at the Grand Theatre in Warsaw in 2003 as Contessa di Folleville in the Polish premiere of Rossini's Il viaggio a Reims. She sang there Sophie in Moniuszko's Halka directed by Maria Fołtyn, Rosina in The Barber of Seville conducted by Will Crutchfield, Violetta in Verdi's La traviata, Hanna in Moniuszko's The Haunted Manor directed by David Pountney, and the title part in Żeleński's Goplana.

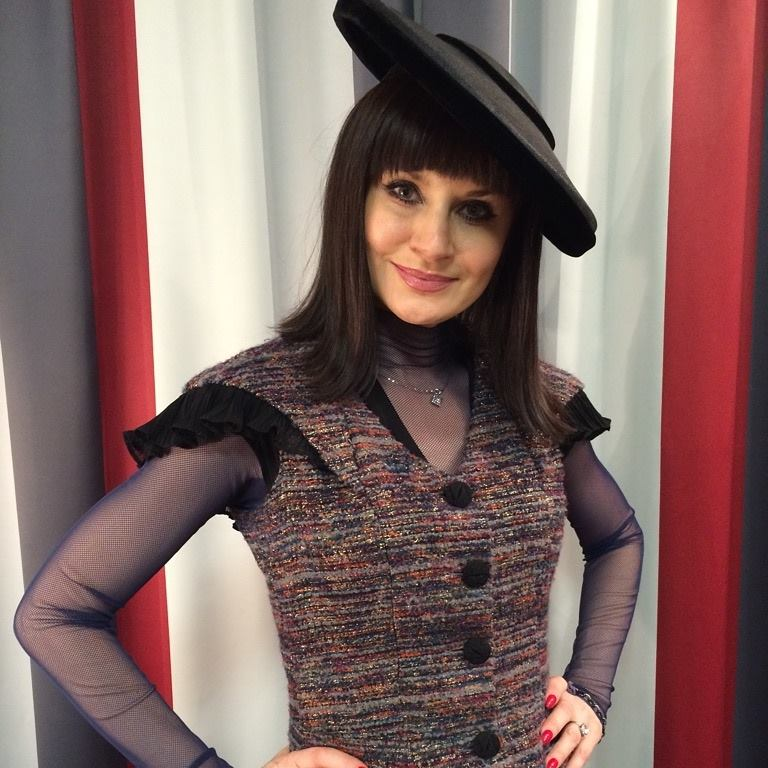
Piasecka as Fiorilla in Rossini's Il turco in Italia, Warsaw 2017

Two productions with her were broadcast-ed by Opera Platform: Moniuszko's The Haunted Manor and Żeleński's Goplana (rewarded by International Opera Awards in category "Work rediscovered").

In 2010 she was the soprano soloist in Orff's Carmina Burana with the Silesian Philharmonic.

In March 2017 she performed Fiorilla in Rossini's Il turco in Italia directed by Christopher Alden in Warsaw.

She also sang, in concert version, Mimi in Puccini's La bohème and Bellini's Norma.

She performs in many oratorios and symphonic work, such as Verdi's Messa da Requiem; Mozart's Exsultate, jubilate, Coronation Mass, Requiem; Stabat Maters by Pergolesi, Rossini and Szymanowski; Vivaldi's Gloria; Villa-Lobos' Bachianas Brasileiras. She collaborates with Polish and international opera houses and philharmonics, she has performed in music festivals in Poland and abroad.

Outside of Poland, she has sung in Hungary, Belgium, the Netherlands, Germany, the USA, Denmark, Kuwait, and Italy.

== Repertoire ==
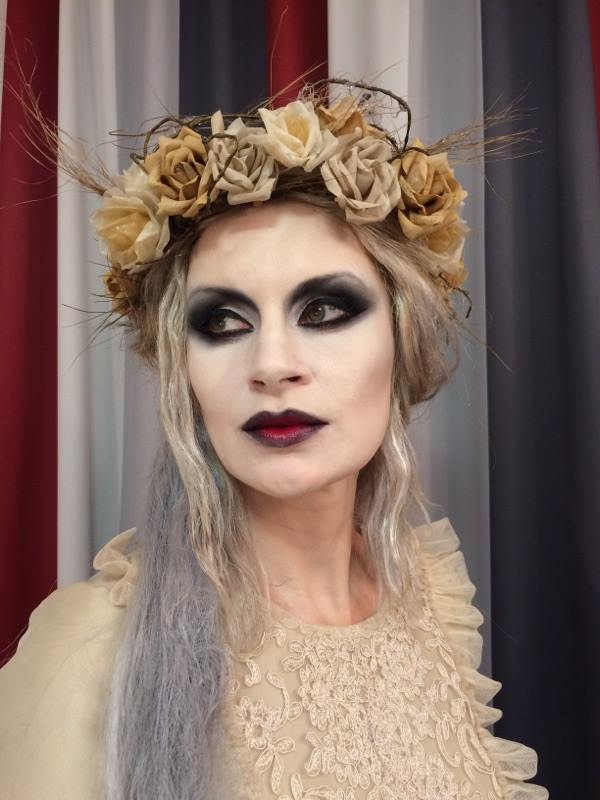
Edyta Piasecka as Goplana in Żeleński's opera

Opera:

- T. Adam, Toreador, Coralina
- V. Bellini, Norma, Norma
- G. Donizetti, Lucia di Lammermoor, Lucia
- R. Leoncavallo, Pagliacci, Nedda
- S. Moniuszko, Halka, Sophia
- S. Moniuszko, The Hanted Manor, Hanna
- W.A. Mozart, Cosi fan tutte, Fiordiriligi
- W.A. Mozart, The Magic Flute, Queen of the Night
- W.A. Mozart, Don Giovanni, Donna Anna
- W.A. Mozart, Le nozze di Figaro, Contessa
- G. Puccini, La boheme, Mimi, Musetta
- G. Rossini, Il barbiere di Siviglia, Rosina
- G. Rossini, Il viaggio a Reims, Contessa di Folleville
- G. Rossini, Il turco in Italia, Fiorilla
- G. Verdi, Rigoletto, Gilda
- G. Verdi, Traviata, Violetta
- W. Żeleński, Goplana, Goplana

Operetta:

- J. Strauss, Die Fledermaus, Rosalinda

Oratoria and symphonic works:

- H. M. Górecki, II Symphony "Copernicus"
- W.Kilar, Angelus
- W.Kilar, Te deum
- G. Mahler, II Symfonia c-moll
- W.A. Mozart, Exsultate, jubilate
- W.A. Mozart, Msza Koronacyjna
- W.A. Mozart, Requiem;
- W.A. Mozart, Grabmusik
- C.Orff, Carmina Burana
- G.B.Pergolesi, Stabat Mater
- G. Rossini, Stabat Mater
- Fr. Schubert, Msza As-dur
- K. Szymanowski, Litania
- K. Szymanowski, Stabat Mater
- A. Vivaldi, Gloria
- G. Verdi, Quatro pezzi sacri
- G. Verdi, Requiem
- H. Villa-Lobos, Bachianas Brasileiras

Songs of Polish composers:

- Fryderyk Chopin;
- Witold Friemann;
- Mieczysław Karłowicz;
- Witold Lutosławski,
- Stanisław Moniuszko;
- Karol Szymanowski;
- Władysław Żeleński.
