= Piasecki =

Piasecki (feminine: Piasecka, plural: Piaseccy) is a Polish family name and may refer to one of the following.

- Anna Piasecka (1882–1980), Polish politician
- Barbara Piasecka Johnson (1937–2013), Polish-American philanthropist and art collector
- Bartosz Piasecki (born 1984), Norwegian fencer
- Bolesław Piasecki (1915–1979), Polish politician
- Edyta Piasecka, Polish soprano
- Fabian Piasecki (born 1995), Polish footballer
- Francis Piasecki (1951–2018), French footballer
- Frank Piasecki (1919–2008), American engineer and founder of two aviation businesses:

- Piasecki Helicopter
- Piasecki Aircraft

- Jess Piasecki, British long-distance runner
- Karol Piasecki (1897–1953), Polish military officer and intelligence operative
- Lech Piasecki (born 1961), Polish cyclist
- Paweł Piasecki (1579–1649), Polish bishop and historian
- Sergiusz Piasecki (1901–1964), Polish writer
- Stanisław Piasecki (1900–1941), Polish right-wing activist, politician and journalist
- Zofia Posmysz-Piasecka (1923–2022), Polish writer
- Zygmunt Piasecki (1893–1954), Polish general, recipient of Virtuti Militari order
