= Ján Koehler =

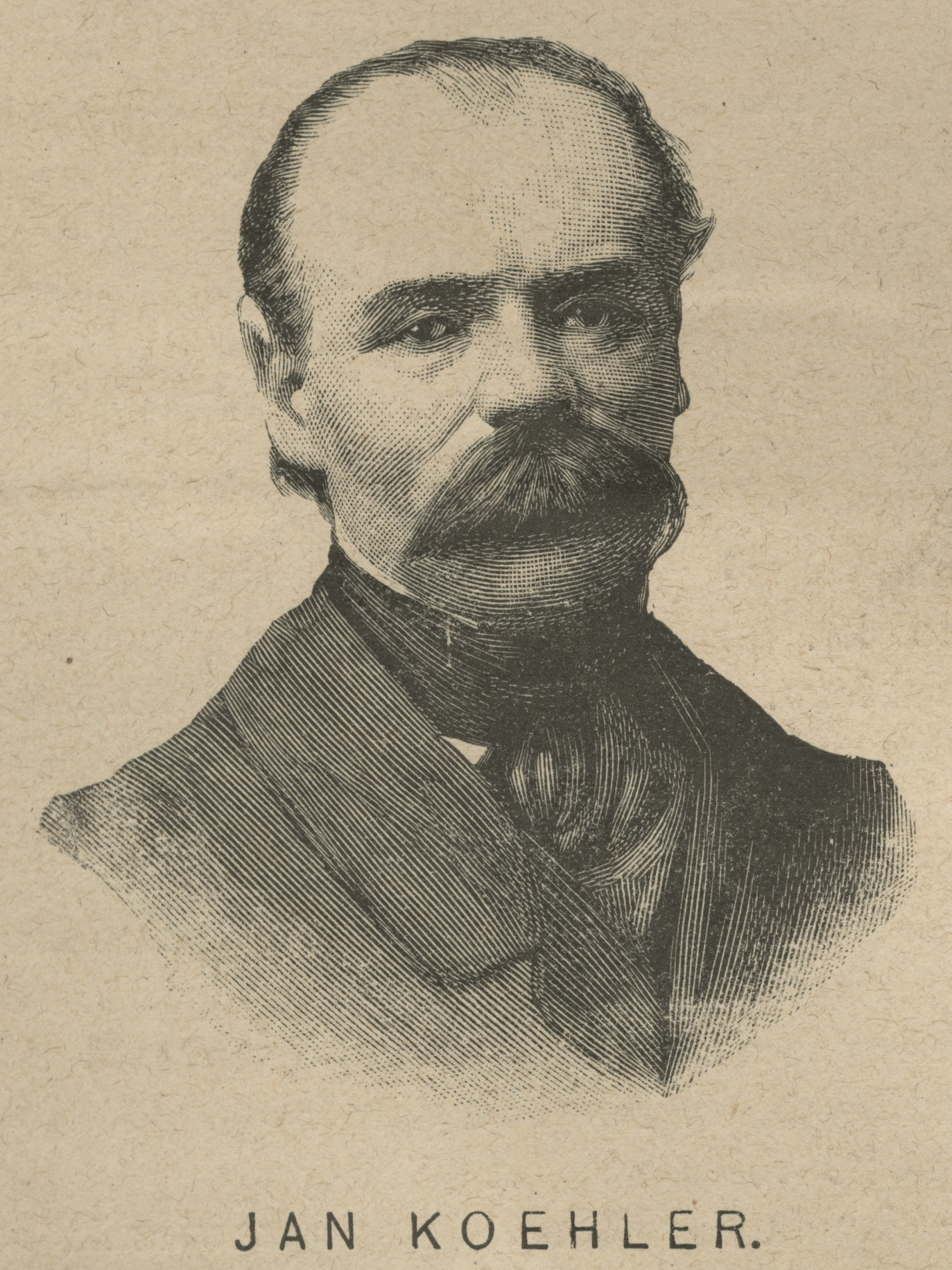
Jan Koehler

Ján Koehler (died 28 June 1895) was a Polish operatic baritone. Born in Lviv, he studied singing in his native city and in Vienna. He made his professional debut in Lviv in 1845 as Raimunds in Conradin Kreutzer's Der Verschwender. From 1857 to 1872 he was a leading artist at the Teatr Wielki, Warsaw where he notably created the role of Maciej in the world premiere of Stanisław Moniuszko's The Haunted Manor.

He retired from the stage in 1885 and lived in retirement in Lviv until his death there 10 years later.
