= Wilhelm Troszel =

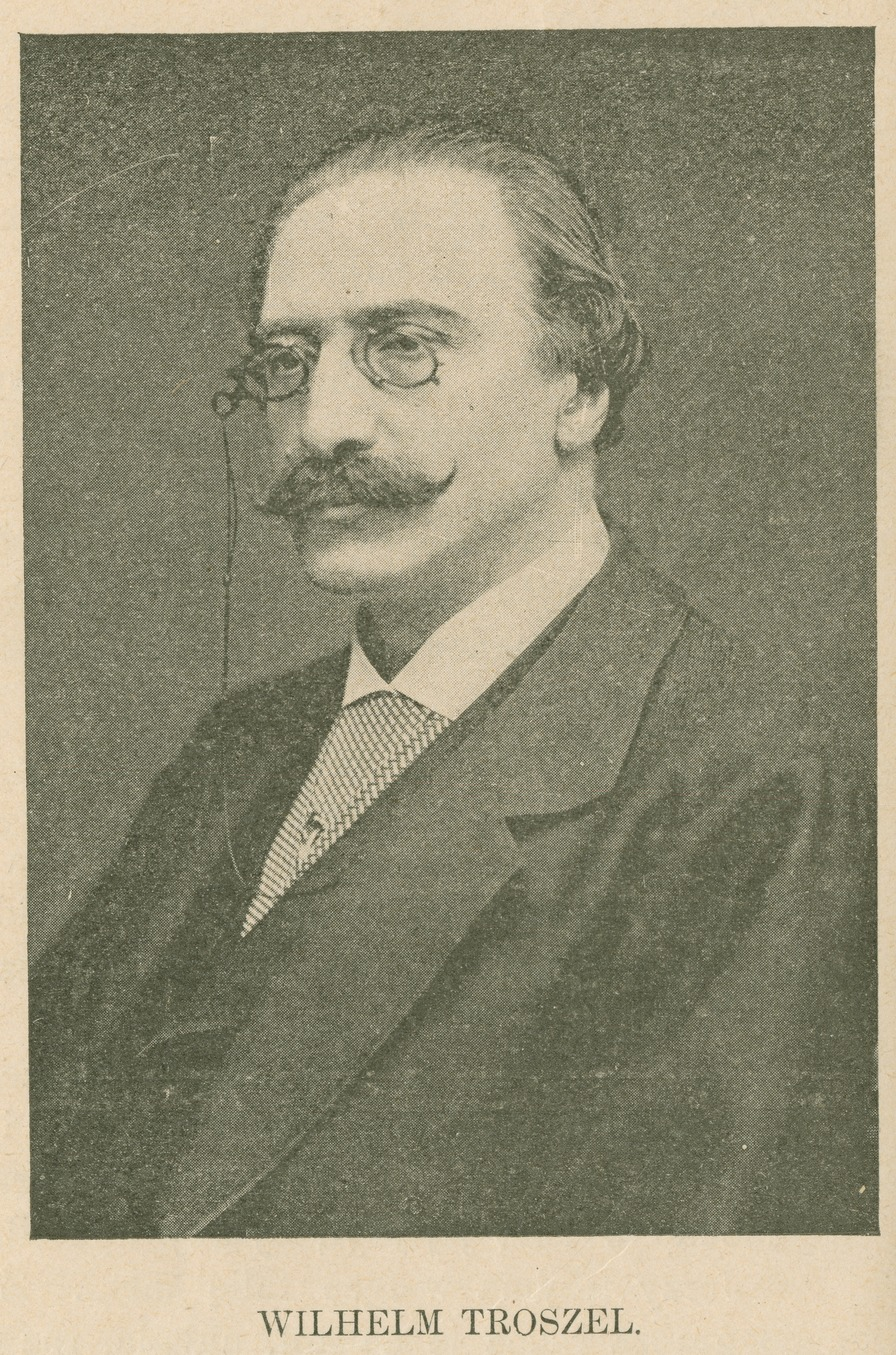
Wilhelm Troszel

Wilhelm Troszel (26 August 1823 - 2 March 1887) was a Polish composer and operatic bass. Born in Warsaw, he was the son of composer and piano maker Wilhelm Troschel. Toszel studied vocal techniques with August Freyer. He made his stage debut at the Grand Theatre, Warsaw on 17 April 1843. At that theatre he notably created the role of Zbigniew in the world premiere of Stanisław Moniuszko's The Haunted Manor at the Grand Theatre, Warsaw in 1865.
