= Matja von Niessen-Stone =

German opera singer (1870–1948)

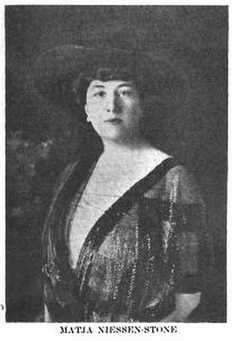
- von Niessen-Stone, from a 1919 publication

Background information
- Birth name: Matja von Niessen
- Born: December 28, 1870; Moscow, Russia
- Origin: Dresden, Germany
- Died: June 8, 1948 (aged 77); New York City, New York, U.S.
- Genres: Opera
- Occupation: Singer
- Years active: 1890–1940s

Matja von Niessen-Stone (December 28, 1870 — June 8, 1948) was a Russian-born German concert singer. She sang with the Metropolitan Opera from 1908 to 1910.

== Early life ==
Matja von Niessen was born in Moscow, the daughter of Hermann von Niessen, an architect, and Mathilde Bergmann von Niessen. She was raised in Germany by her mother after 1876, and educated there. She studied music under Adelina Paschalis, Etelka Gerster, and George Fergusson.

== Career ==
Matja von Niessen was variously classified as a mezzo-soprano, contralto, and mezzo-contralto during her career. She gave her debut concert in Dresden in 1890, and toured extensively in Europe after that. She was appointed as an instructor at the Imperial School of Music in Odessa in 1896, and in 1901 at music school in Riga.

She moved to the United States in 1906. "Matja von Niessen-Stone is the mistress of a faultless vocal method and unusual interpretive gifts," noted an American publication in 1907, "an unalloyed treat for discerning music lovers." Matja von Niessen-Stone made her Metropolitan Opera debut in 1908, in Die Walküre; she also appeared in productions of La Traviata, Carmen, Faust, Rigoletto, and Cavalleria Rusticana. She was a last-minute substitute for Louise Homer in 1910, when she was too ill to perform in Tristan und Isolde in Boston. Also in 1910, she sang at a meeting for women's suffrage in New York. She was known for her impressive language skills, and for singing new works by American women composers such as Carrie Jacobs-Bond, Rhea Silberta, Emilie Frances Bauer, and Fay Foster.

She also taught at Frank Damrosch's Institute of Musical Art in New York (precursor to the Juilliard School), where she was head of the vocal department. Later in life, she taught at the Delaware School of Music, and at the Zeckwer-Hahn Philadelphia Musical Academy.

== Personal life ==
Matja von Niessen married W. E. Stone in 1897, in Berlin. They had a son, Patrick William Stone. Matja von Niessen-Stone died in 1948, aged 77 years, in New York City.
