= Adolf Kozieradski =

Polish operatic bass-baritone

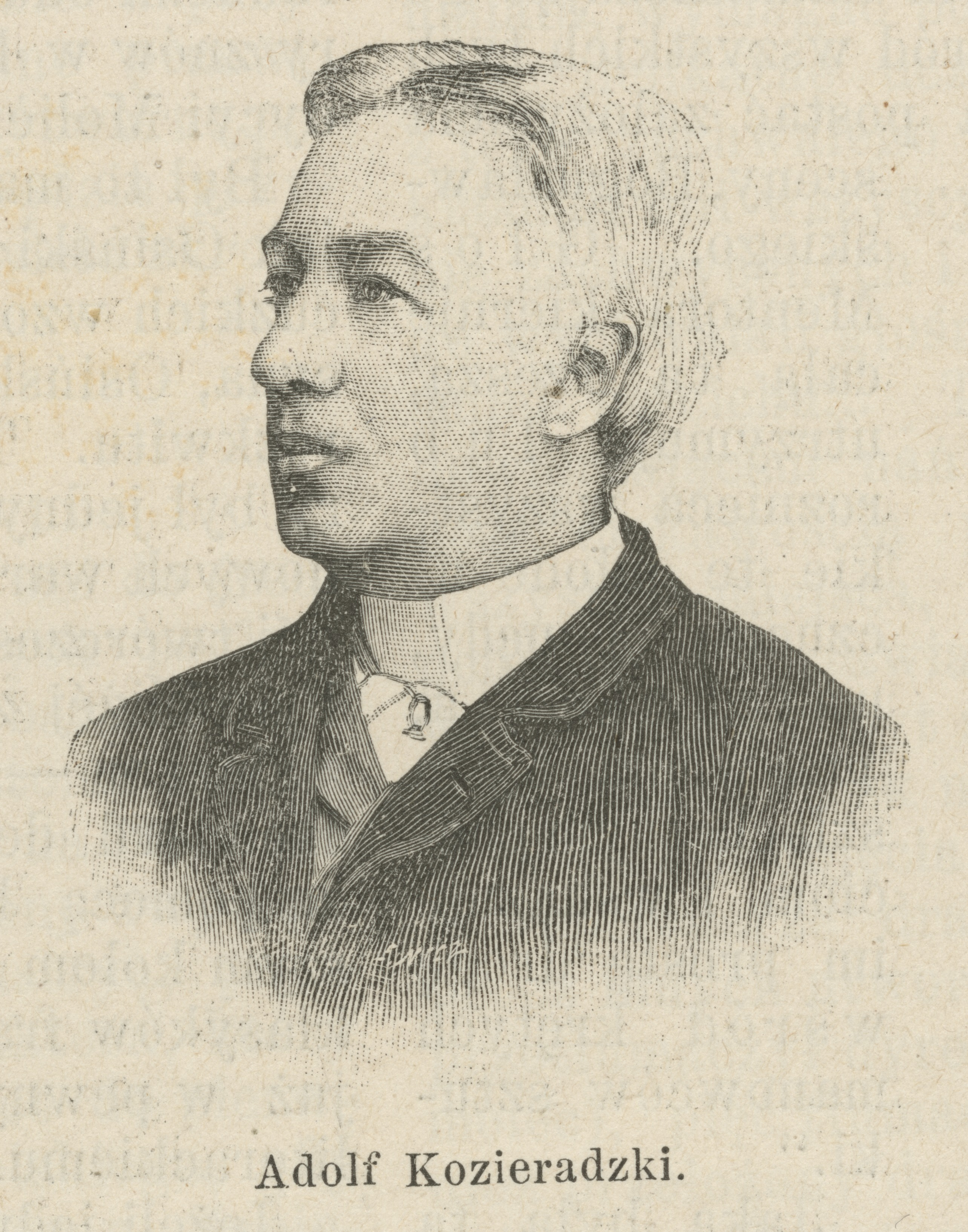
Adolf Kozieradski

Adolf Kozieradski (30 June 1835 - 14 November 1901) was a Polish operatic bass-baritone. He notably created the role of Miecznik in the world premiere of Stanisław Moniuszko's The Haunted Manor at the Great Theatre, Warsaw in 1865.
