= Julián Dobrski =

Polish operatic tenor

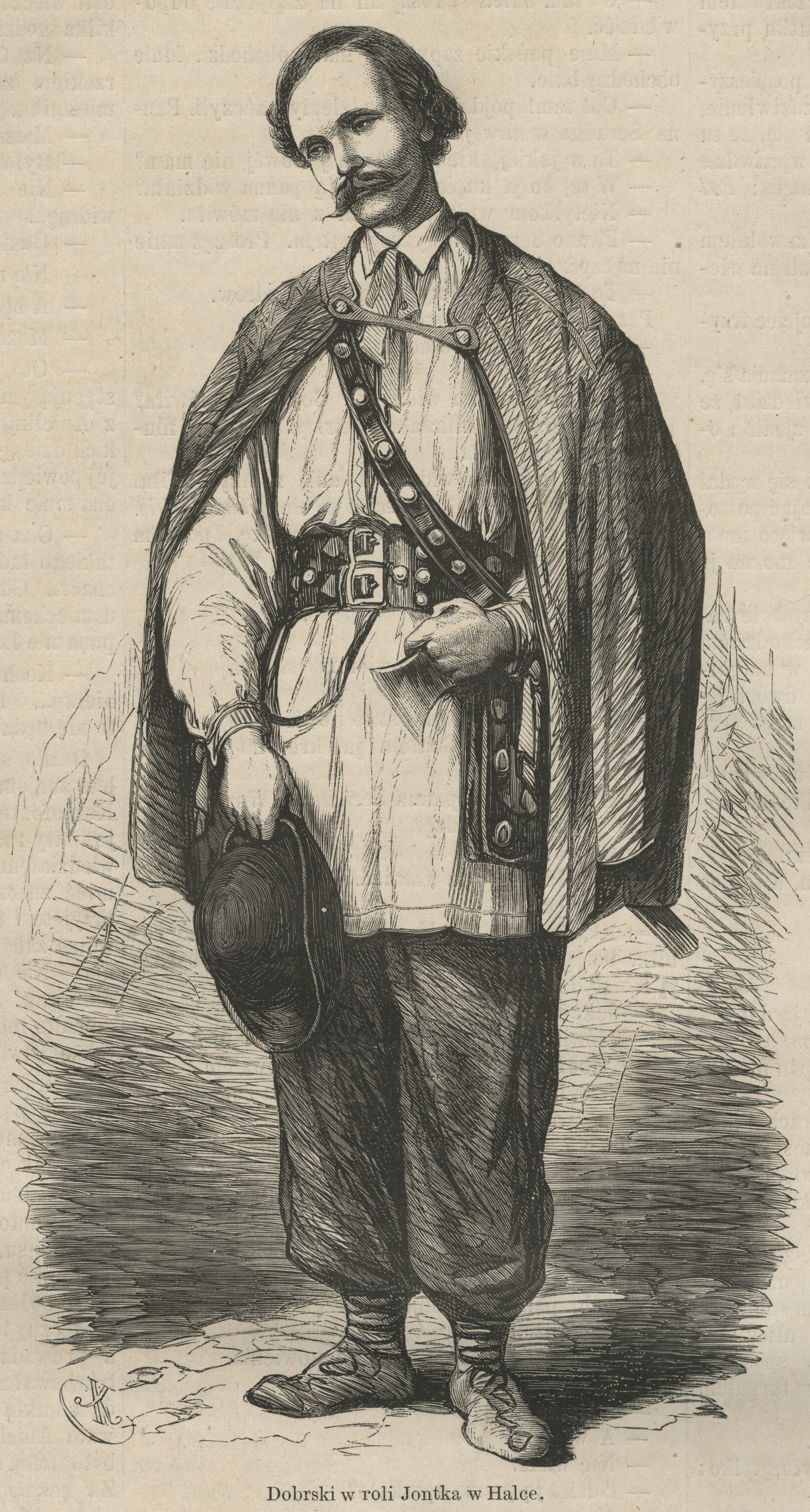
Julian Dobrski

Julián Dobrski (31 December 1811 or 1812, Nowe - 2 May 1886, Warsaw) was a Polish operatic tenor. He studied in Warsaw with Carlo Evasio Soliva and was one of the main tenors at the Grand Theatre, Warsaw, from 1832 to 1861, and again in 1865 when he sang the role of Stefan in the world premiere of Stanisław Moniuszko's The Haunted Manor.
