= Witold Friemann =

Polish composer, pianist and conductor

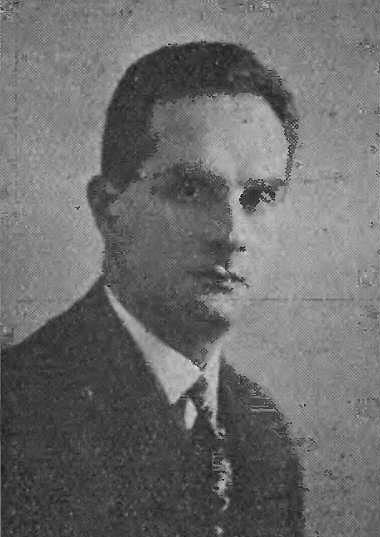
Witold Friemann

Witold Friemann (20 August 1889 in Konin – 22 March 1977 in Laski) was a Polish composer, pianist, conductor and pedagogue. He was very prolific and composed more than 350 Opuses, most of which remain inedited.

== Compositions ==
=== Stage ===
- Giewont, musical drama (dramat muzyczny; libretto by Kazimierz Brończyk; 1927–1929, 1934)
- Kain, opera (1952)
- Kasia, baśń operowa (1955)
- Bazyliszek (legenda warszawska), vaudeville (1958)

=== Vocal ===
- Psalm VIII for soloists, chorus and orchestra, text by Jan Kochanowski (1910)
- Psalm XXX for soloists, chorus and orchestra, text by Jan Kochanowski (1921)
- Psalm XC for chorus, text by Jan Kochanowski (1922)
- Suita podhalańska for baryton solo and string orchestra (1946/1950)
- Polskie misterium ludowe for soloists, mixed chorus and piano, text by Maria Konopnicka (1946)
- 4 suity mazowieckie for soloists, mixed chorus and orchestra (1948–51)
- Spod Warszawy for soloist, mixed chorus and orchestra (1949)
- Cień Chopina for baryton, piano and orchestra, text by Kazimierz Przerwa-Tetmajer (1949)
- Rapsod mazowiecki for soloist, mixed chorus and orchestra (1950)
- Pacem in terris (pro memoria Joannes XXIII, Op.253, for mixed chorus and orchestra (1963)
- Cudne oczy (second version) for soprano (or tenor) and orchestra (1967)
- Litania o zjednoczenie chrześcijan, Op.316, for mixed chorus and orchestra (1969)
- Litania o zjednoczenie ludzkości, Op.318, for soprano, tenor, baryton, bass, female, male and mixed choruses and orchestra (1969)
- Cudne oczy (third version) for soprano (or tenor) and orchestra (1970)
- Równy krok for mixed chorus and orchestra (1971)
- Piosenka o Koninie for mixed chorus a cappella (1971)
- Didache for chorus and piano (1974)
- Hymn dla Polski for chorus and piano (1976)

=== Orchestral ===
- Konrad Wallenrod, symphonic poem (1908)
- Inwokacja for 12 winds and timpani (1926)
- Funeral march (1928)
- Symphony No. 1 Słowiańska (1948)
- Symphony No. 2 Sinfonietta Mazowiecka (1950)
- 2 suity chłopskie (1952)
- Symphony No. 3 (1953)
- Suita mazowiecka (1956)

=== Concertant ===
- Piano Concerto No. 1 Koncert-fantazja, Op.16 (1910-1913)
- Cień Chopina, fantasy for piano and orchestra, Op.77 (1937)
- Cello Concerto (1950)
- Piano Concerto No. 2 (1951)
- Piano Concerto No. 3 (1952)
- Viola Concerto No. 1, Op.175 (1952)
- Violin Concerto (1954)
- Piano Concerto No. 4 (1956)
- Clarinet Concerto No. 1 (1960)
- Oboe Concerto Concerto lirico (1961)
- Clarinet Concerto No. 2 (1961)
- Concerto for soprano and orchestra (1961)
- Concerto for 2 pianos solo (1962)
- Piano Concert No. 5 Concerto impetuoso (1963)
- Flute Concerto (1963)
- Bassoon Concerto (1963)
- Concertino for 2 pianos solo (1963)
- Concerto for tenor trombone and orchestra No. 1 Concerto eroico (1966)
- Horn Concerto, for French horn in F and orchestra (1966–68)
- Trumpet Concerto (1967)
- Viola Concerto No. 2, for viola solo, string orchestra, timpani and cymbals (1968)
- Concerto for 2 bassoons and orchestra (1968)
- Concerto for tenor trombone and orchestra No. 2 (1969)
- Concerto for bass trombone and orchestra (1969–70)
- Double bass Concerto, Op.329 (1970)
- Cztery pieśni rycerskie, Concertino for viola and harp with flute, oboe, clarinet, 2 bassoons, contrabassoon and percussion (1970)
- Tańce polskie for clarinet and orchestra (1975)

=== Chamber ===
- Violin Sonata No. 1 Sonata polska (1912)
- Elegy for cello and piano (1913)
- Nokturne for violin and piano (1921)
- Romance for violin and piano (1922)
- Opowieść wschodnia for oboe, violin, cello and piano (1931)
- String Quartet No. 1 Rapsod śląski (1932)
- Prelude for cello and piano (1933)
- 4 pieśni rycerskie, suite for viola and harp or piano (1935)
- Suita antica for violin and piano (1935)
- Viola Sonata (1935)
- Mazurek for violin and piano (1939)
- Oberek for violin and piano (1939)
- 3 pieces for viola and piano (1940–47)
- String Quartet No. 2 (1942)
- Piano Quintet No. 1, with clarinet (1943)
- Violin Sonata No. 2 (1947)
- 2 Romances for violin and piano (1947)
- Clarinet Sonata No. 1 Quasi una sonata (1949)
- Polska suita for violin and piano, in A major (1950)
- String Quartet No. 3 (1953)
- Wind Trio (1953)
- Suite for clarinet and piano (1953)
- Piano Quintet No. 2 (1954)
- Piano Quartet (1954)
- Prelude for violin and piano, in G minor (1954)
- Clarinet Sonata No. 2 (1959)
- Clarinet Sonata No. 3 Romantica (1959)
- Polska suita for flute and piano (1964)
- 3 Mazurkas for violin and piano (1954)
- Improvisation for tenor trombone (1966)
- Taniec śląski for violin and piano (1967)
- I Suita kontemplacyjna (Contemplative suite No. 1) for trombone and piano (1968)
- Polonez majestatyczny for tuba and piano (1969)
- Danse a l’antique for flute and piano (1970)
- Myśli for viola and piano (1971)
- Choral for 4 trombones (1972)
- Suite for 4 trombones and bass drum (1972)
- Improvisation and Polonaise for clarinet and piano (1973)
- Nocturne for cello and piano, in G major (1974)
- Andante molto for clarinet and piano, in F major (1974)
- Mazurek for viola and piano, in G minor (1975)
- Suite for 4 trombones (1976)
- 2 pieces for 3 trombones (1976)
- Kiedy ranne wstają zorze for 2 clarinets, 2 bassoons, contrabassoon, timpani and cymbals (1976)
- Duet-romanza for 2 trombones (1976).

=== Piano solo ===
- Smutna opowieść (1910)
- Suita staroświecka (1927)
- Etude in seconds, Op.53 (1928)
- Opowieść morska (1943)
- Introduction and ballade (1948)
- 18 Miniatures, Op.154 (1950)
- 50 miniatur dwugłosowych (1966)
- 50 utworów romantycznych: preludia, mazurki (1966)
- Quasi Notturno (1969)
- Preludium tragiczne (1969)
- Romance and Vita dolorosa (1975)
- Pensées tres tristet [?] (1976)
- Mazurkas, more than 160
- Preludes, more than 180

=== Organ ===
- Muzyka w czasie Mszy św. (1944)

=== Songs with piano ===
- Anioł, song for voice and piano, text by Michail Lermontov (1909)
- Modlitwa, song for voice and piano, text by Leopold Staff (1913)
- Pieśń czerkieska, song for voice and piano, text by Michail Lermontov (1922)
- Zwycięstwo, song for voice and piano, text by Rabindranath Tagore (1925)
- Cudne oczy, song for voice and piano, text by Kazimierz Przerwa-Tetmajer (1928)
- Pamiętam ciche, jasne, złote dnie, song for voice and piano, text by Kazimierz Przerwa-Tetmajer (1928)
- Noc majowa, song for voice and piano, text by Kazimierz Przerwa-Tetmajer (1928)
- Chanson d’automne, song for voice and piano, text by Paul Verlaine (1933)
- Cudne oczy (first version) for soprano (or tenor) and piano (1967)
- Gwiazdy w twych włosach for tenor (or soprano) and piano (1969)
- Przez dżungle i puszcze for tenor (or mezzo-soprano) and piano (1969)
- Dwa for tenor (or mezzo-soprano) and piano (1969)
