= List of compositions by Stanisław Moniuszko =

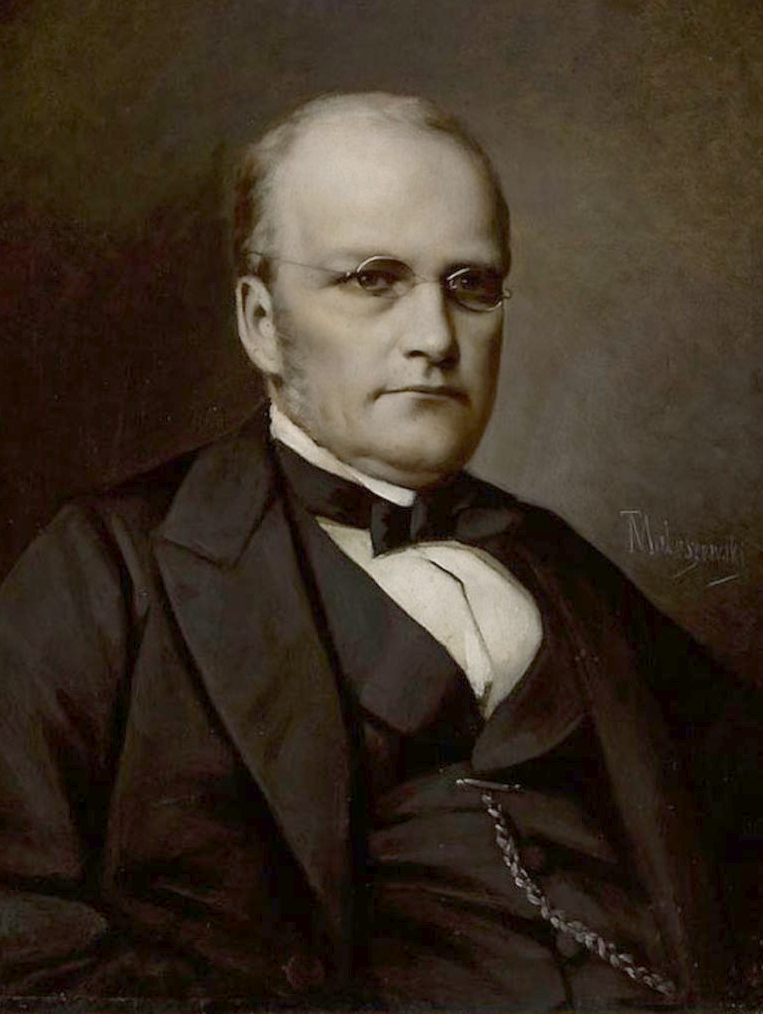
Stanisław Moniuszko

This is a list of compositions by Stanisław Moniuszko.

== Stage works ==
=== Operettas ===
| Work | Form | Composed | Libretto | Première |
|---|---|---|---|---|
| Biuraliści (The Bureaucrats) | operetta in one act | c. 1835 | I F Skarbeck | unperformed |
| Nocleg w Apeninach (A Night in the Apennines) | operetta in one act | c. 1837-9 | A Fredro | Vilnius, 1839 |
| Cudowna woda (The Miraculous Water) | operetta in two acts, lost except overture | 1840-1 | | |
| Ideał, czyli Nowe Precjoza (Perfection, or The New Preciosa) | operetta in two acts | c. 1841 | O Milewski | Vilnius, 1840 |
| Karmaniol, czyli Francuzi lubią żartować (Carmagnole, or The French Like Joking) | operetta | c. 1840-1 | O Milewski (after Théaulon de Torges and E Jaime) | unperformed |
| Nowy Don Kichot, czyl Sto szaleństw (The New Don Quixote, or 100 Follies) | operetta in three acts | 1841 | A Fredro (after M de Cervantes) | Lwów 1849; Warsaw, 1923 |
| Żółta szlafmyca (The Yellow Nightcap) | operetta | c. 1841 | F Zablocki | lost |
| Loteria (The Lottery) | operetta in one act | c. 1842-3 | O Milewski | Minsk, 1843 |
| Cyganie (The Gypsies) (revised as Jawnuta 1860) | operetta | c. 1852 | F D Kniaźnin | Vilnius, 20 May 1852 |
| Beata | operetta in one act | c. 1870-1 | Jan Chęciński | Warsaw, 2 February 1872 |
| Pobór rekrutów (Conscription) | operetta | 1842 | Vintsent Dunin-Martsinkyevich | lost |

=== Operas ===
| Work | Form | Composed | Libretto | Première |
|---|---|---|---|---|
| Halka | opera in two acts, later enlarged to four acts | c. 1847–8 & 1857 | Włodzimierz Wolski (after Kazimierz Władysław Wójcicki) | Vilnius, 1 January 1848 |
| Sielanka (Idyll) | opera in two acts | c. 1848? | Vintsent Dunin-Martsinkyevich | Minsk, 9 February 1852 |
| Betty | comic opera in two acts | c. 1852 | F Schober (after Scribe and Mélesville) | Vilnius, 20 May 1852 |
| Flis (The Raftsman) | opera in one act | c. 1858 | S Boguslawski | Warsaw, 24 September 1858 |
| Rokiczana (The King of Peasants) | incomplete | c. 1859 | J Korzeniowski | unperformed |
| Hrabina (The Countess) | opera in three acts | c. 1859 | Włodzimierz Wolski | Warsaw, 7 February 1860 |
| Jawnuta | opera in two acts | c. 1860 | | Warsaw 5 June 1860 |
| Verbum nobile | opera in one act | c. 1860 | Jan Chęciński | Warsaw, 1 January 1861 |
| Straszny Dwór (The Haunted Manor) | opera in four acts | c. 1861–4 | Jan Chęciński (after Kazimierz Władysław Wójcicki) | Warsaw, 28 September 1865 |
| Paria | opera in three acts with prologue | c. 1859–69 | Jan Chęciński (after a play by Delavigne) | Warsaw, 11 December 1869 |
| Trea | incomplete | c. 1872 | J Jasiński after a Femish legend | unperformed |
| Nowy dziedzic (The New Landlord) | incomplete | undated | | unperformed |
| Sen wieszcza (The Seer's Dream) | incomplete | undated | Władysław Syrokomla after J B Rosier and A de Leuven | unperformed |
| Walka muzyków (The Musicians' Struggle) | incomplete | undated | Vintsent Dunin-Martsinkyevich | lost |

=== Ballet ===
- Monte Christo, after Alexandre Dumas (1866)
- Na kwaterunku (On the Billet) (1868)
- Figle szatana (Satan's Tricks aka Devil's Frolics) (1870)
- Merry Wives of Windsor (c. 1849), ballet music composed for the opera of Otto Nicolai

=== Theatre ===
- Kasper Hauser (1843), melodrama by Auguste Anicet-Bourgeois and d'Ennery. First performance: Minsk, November 18, 1843
- Sabaudka (Savoyardess or the Mother's Blessing) melodrama in 5 acts by d'Ennery and Lemoine. First performance: Vilnius, May 6, 1845
- Hamlet. Shakespeare's tragedy. First performance: Warsaw, March 24, 1871
- Zbojcy (Die Rauber). Schiller's tragedy. First performance: Warsaw 1870 and 1871
- Hans Mathis, drama (1872). Finished by Adam Munchheimer
- Karpaccy gorale, drama by J. Korzeniowski

== Vocal ==
=== Cantatas ===
| Work | Form | Composed | Text | Première |
|---|---|---|---|---|
| Milda | cantata for solo voices, mixed choir and orchestra | 1848 | J.I. Kraszewski, after Witolorauda | Vilnius, 18 December 1848 |
| Nijoła (Wundyny | cantata for solo voices, mixed choir and orchestra | after 1848 | partly from Witolorauda | Vilnius, 8 March 1852 |
| Florian Szary (The Grey) | ballad from unfinished opera Rokiczana for baritone solo, choir and orchestra | 1858-9 | J. Korzeniowski | Warsaw, 16 December 1860 |
| Widma (The Ghosts) | cantata for solo voices, mixed choir and orchestra | before 1859 | Adam Mickiewicz, after Dziady (The Forefathers) | Warsaw, 1865 |
| Sonety krymskie (Crimean Sonnets) | cantata (8 sonnets) for solo voices, mixed choir and orchestra | 1867 | Adam Mickiewicz | Warsaw, 16 February 1868 |
| Pani Twardowska | ballad for solo voices, choir and orchestra | 1869 | Adam Mickiewicz | Warsaw, December 1869 |
| Kurmine | cantata | unfinished | | |

=== Sacred ===
==== Masses and litanies ====
| Work | Form | Composed | Text | Première |
|---|---|---|---|---|
| Litanie ostrobramskie (Litanies of Ostra Brama) No.1 in F major | solo voices, mixed choir, organ and orchestra | 1843 | Litaniae Lauretanae (Latin) | |
| Litanie ostrobramskie (Litanies of Ostra Brama) No.2 in F major | solo voices, mixed choir, organ and orchestra | 1849 | Litaniae Lauretanae (Latin) | |
| Pieśni żałobne do mszy świętej za dusze zmarłych (Polish funeral mass) in D minor | solo voices, mixed choir and organ | 1850 ca. | Alojzy Feliński | |
| Polish Mass in E minor | female choir (2 sopranos, alto) and organ | 1855 | A.E. Odyniec (Polish), Achilles Bonoldi (Latin) | |
| Polish Mass in A minor | female choir (soprano, alto) and organ | 1856 ca. | A.E. Odyniec | 1857 or earlier |
| Litanie ostrobramskie (Litanies of Ostra Brama) No.3 in E minor | solo voices, mixed choir, organ and orchestra | before 1854 | Litaniae Lauretanae (Latin) | |
| Litanie ostrobramskie (Litanies of Ostra Brama) No.4 in C major | solo voices, mixed choir, organ and orchestra | 1855 | Litaniae Lauretanae (Latin) | |
| Latin Mass in E♭ major | solo voices, mixed choir, organ and string quintet | 1865 | Latin | Warsaw, 26 November 1865 |
| Latin Mass in D♭ major | solo voices, mixed choir, organ and string quintet | 1870 | Latin | Warsaw, September/October 1871 |
| Msza żałobna (Funeral Mass) in G minor | solo voices, mixed choir, organ | 1871 ca. | Requiem (Latin) | |
| Polish Mass in B♭ major "Piotrowinska" (Piotrowin Mass) | solo voices, mixed choir and organ | 1872 | Józef Wojewódzki | Warsaw, 19 May 1872 |

==== Minor works ====
| Work | Form | Composed | Text | Première |
|---|---|---|---|---|
| Oto drzewo krzyza (Ecce lignum crucis) | motet for baritone solo, mixed choir and organ | 1872 | Latin or Polish translation by M. Kotarbinski | Warsaw, 29 March 1872 |
| Modlitwa Panska "Ojcze nasz" in E minor (The Lord's Prayer "Our Father") | 4-part mixed choir and orchestra or organ | | | Warsaw, 17 June 1859 |
| Psalm "Ne memineris" | solo voices, mixed choir, organ and string quintet | | Latin | |
| Psalm "Vide humilitatem meam" | mixed choir, sting quintet and organ | | Polish | |
| Requiem aeternam | 11 solo voices, mixed choir and orchestra | | | |

=== Songs ===
More than 300, listing the most popular:

- Chochlik (The Imp). Text by A.E. Odyniec
- Czaty (The Ambush), ballad. Text by A. Mickiewicz. Also in a version with orchestra
- Czarny krzyżyk (The Little Black Cross). Text by Bruno Bielawski.
- Dziad i baba (The Old Man and The Old Woman). Text by J.I. Kraszewski
- Dziadek i babka (Grandpa and Grandma). Text by P. Jankowski
- Entuzjasta (The Enthusiast). Text by J. Prusinowski
- Kozak (Cossack). Also known as Tam na gorze jawor stoi
- Kum i kuma (Chums). Text by J. Czeczot
- Łzy (Tears). Text by A.E. Odyniec
- Maciek. Text by T. Lenartowicz
- Magda karczmarka (Magda, the Innkeeper). Also known as W pustej karczmie Magda siedzi, ballad. Text by E. Sztyrmer
- Nad Nidą (On Nida River). Text by Włodzimierz Wolski
- Panicz i dziewczyna (The Young Master and The Girl). Also known as W gaiku zielonym. Text by A.E. Odyniec
- Pieśń wieczorna (The Song at Dusk). Also known as Po nocnej rosie. Text by W. Syrokomla
- Piosnka żołnierza (Soldier's Song). Also known as Już matka zasnęła. Text by J. Korzeniowski
- Polna różyczka (The Little, Field Rose). Text by J. Grajnert
- Powrót taty (Father's Return). Text by A. Mickiewicz
- Prząśniczka (The Spinner). Text by J. Czeczot. Also in a version with orchestra
- Rozmowa (Conversation). Also known as Kochanko moja, na co nam rozmowa. Text by A. Mickiewicz
- Rybka (The Fish). Text by A. Mickiewicz
- Świerszcz (The Cricket). Text by J.N. Kaminski
- Świtezianka (The Nymph of Lake Switez). Text by A. Mickiewicz
- Tren X (Lament No. X). Also known as Urszulo moja wdzieczna. Text by J. Kochanowski
- Trzech Budrysów (Three Budryses). Text by A. Mickiewicz. Also in a version with orchestra
- Trzy śpiewy: Niepewnosc, Pieszczotka, Sen (Three Chants: Uncertainty, Cuddlesome One, Dream). Text by A. Mickiewicz. German translation Blankensee
- Wilija (Christmas Eve). Text by A. Mickiewicz
- Znaszli ten kraj (Do You Know Such Land). Text by A. Mickiewicz, after J. W. Goethe

== Instrumental ==
=== Chamber ===
- String quartet no.1 in D minor (1839)
- String quartet no.2 in F major (before 1840)

=== Organ ===
- Organ compositions on the themes of church songs, among others Vespers and Song of Ostra Brama. Published: Warsaw, 1862.

=== Piano ===
- Fraszki (Trifles). Two books. Published: Vilnius, 1843
- Nocturne in A♭ major. Published: Vilnius, 1846
- Mazurka in D major. Published: Vilnius, before 1846
- Six Polonaises. Published: Vilnius, 1846
- Polka in C major. Published: Warsaw, 1851
- Polka, "Daniel". Published: Warsaw, 1852
- Polka, "Gabirela". Published: Warsaw, 1855
- "Spring" Polka. Published: Warsaw, 1860
- Vilanelle in B♭ major. Published: Warsaw, 1851
- Three Waltzes. Published: Warsaw, 1852
- "Wedding" Mazurka. Published: Warsaw, 1872
- Kolysanka (Cradle Song) in D major. Published: Warsaw, 19 March 1872
- Piano transcriptions of opera fragments and of works by other composers, among others Six Polonaises of Michal Oginski. Published: Warsaw, before 1858
- Original compositions and transcriptions for piano duet

=== Symphonic ===
- Bajka (Fairytale), fantastic overture (1848). Two versions. First performed: Vilnius, 1 May 1848
- Kain, overture (1856). First performance: St. Petersburg, March 1856
- War Overture. First performance: Vilnius, 19 March 1857
- Polonez koncertowy (concert polonaise) in A major, for large orchestra (1866)
- Polonez obywatelski, civic polonaise in F major (after 1863)
