= Paulina Rivoli =

Polish operatic soprano (1823–1881)

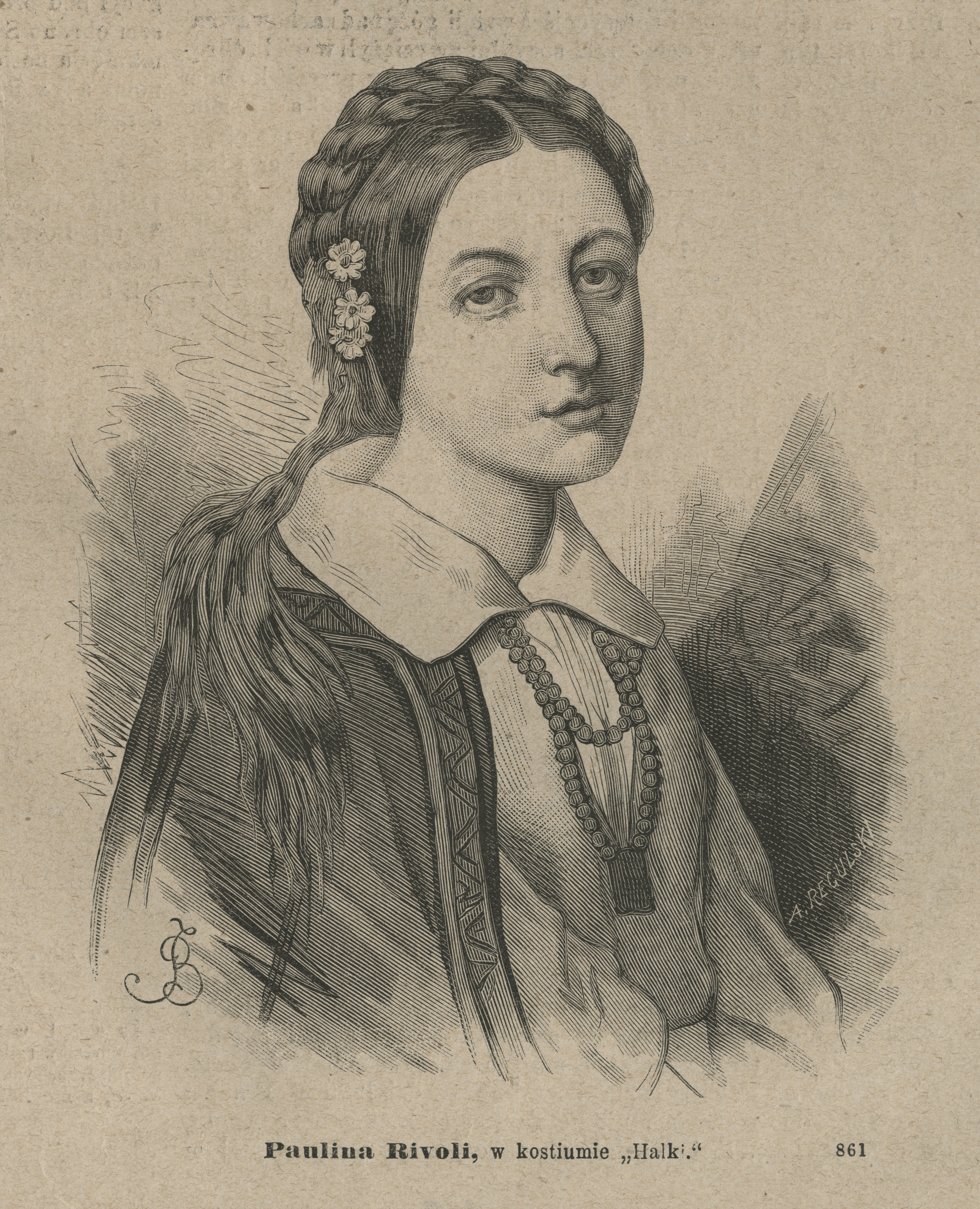
Paulina Rivoli

Paulina Rivoli (born Paulina Rywacka, 22 July 1817 (Note: Some sources give the year 1822, but according to Leo Riemens and K. J. Kutsch the 1817 year is the correct year. Grove Music Online gives both years as possible.) – 12 October 1881) was a Polish operatic soprano who had an active career as a leading soprano in Warsaw from 1837–1860. She mainly performed in Poland, and only occasionally appeared in theaters in other countries. She began her career at the Teatr Wielki in 1837; leaving there to become a resident soprano at the Grand Theatre, Warsaw in 1842. The Grand Theatre remained her artistic home until her retirement in 1860.

== Life and career ==
Paulina Rywacka was born on July 22, 1817 in Vilnius, Lithuania. She was born into a Polish family of actors who lived a nomadic existence. Her older sister was the coloratura soprano Ludwika Rywacka (1814–1858) who like Paulina had a career as a resident artist at the Warsaw Opera. Paulina was trained as an opera singer by Karol Kurpiński at the Wielki Theatre (WT); beginning her studies in 1834. She made her opera debut at the WT on 17 June 1837 in L'italiana in Algeri.

In 1842 Rivoli made her debut at the Grand Theatre, Warsaw (GTW) in Adolphe Adam's Le Brasseur de Preston. She was thereafter a much admire prima donna at that opera house until her retirement in 1860. At the GTW she had great success in the roles of Agathe in Carl Maria von Weber's Der Freischütz, Carolina in Domenico Cimarosa's Il matrimonio segreto, and the title role in Friedrich von Flotow's Martha among other parts. She was also successful in the operas of Daniel Auber and Stanisław Moniuszko in addition to appearing in other opera by Weber and Cimarosa.

In 1851 Rivoli spent time performing as a guest artist in opera houses in Italy. A major triumph in her career was a critically successful portrayal of the Jewess Rachel in the first staging in Poland of Fromental Halévy's La Juive at the GTW in 1857. In 1858 she portrayed the title role in the first staging in Warsaw of Moniuszko's Halka. This was notably the premiere of a Moniuszko's revised version of his opera. In her late career she created roles in the world premieres of two operas by Moniuszko at the GTW; portraying Zosia in Flis (1858) and the title role in Hrabina (1860).

Rivoli died in Warsaw on October 12, 1881.

== Notes and references ==
=== Bibliography ===
- Kutsch, K. J.; Riemens, Leo (2003). "Rivoli, Paulina". In Rost, Hansjörg (ed.). Grosses Sängerlexikon. K. G. Saur Verlag. ISBN 9783598440885.
