= Stanisław Moniuszko =

Polish composer, conductor, and pedagogue (1819–1872)

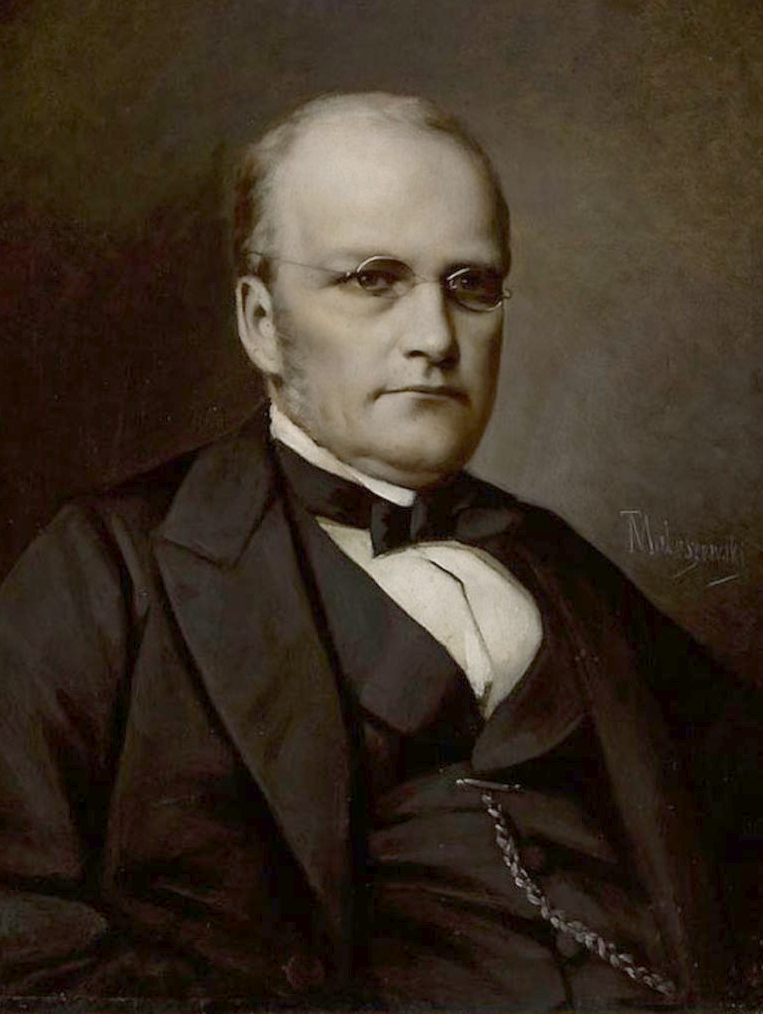
- Moniuszko in 1865
- Born: 17 May [O.S. 5 May] 1819; Ubiel, Russian Empire
- Died: 4 June 1872 (aged 53); Warsaw, Congress Poland, Russian Empire
- Works: List of compositions

Signature
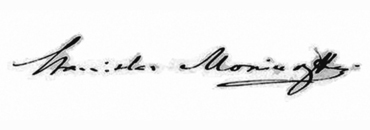

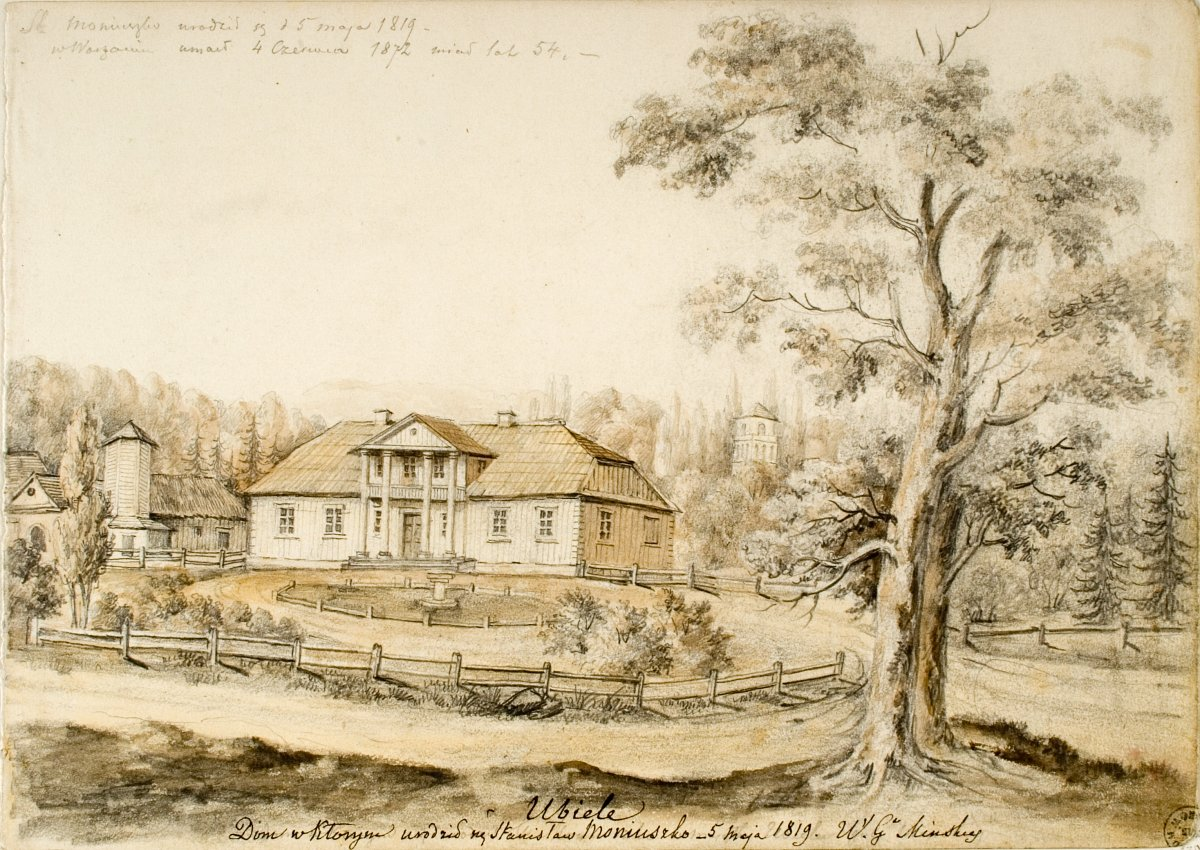
Manor house of the Moniuszko family in Ubiel, sketch by Napoleon Orda created between 1864–1876

Stanisław Moniuszko (Polish: [stãˈɲiswaf mɔ̃ˈɲuʃkɔ]; 17 May [O.S. 5 May] 1819 – June 4, 1872) was a Polish composer, conductor, organist and pedagogue. He wrote many popular art songs and operas, including The Haunted Manor and Halka, and his music is filled with patriotic folk themes of the peoples of the former Polish–Lithuanian Commonwealth (mainly Poles, Lithuanians and Belarusians). He is generally referred to as "the father of Polish national opera". Since the 1990s, Stanisław Moniuszko has been recognized in Belarus as an important figure to Belarusian culture as well. (Note: There is a Museum of Stanisław Moniuszko in Belarus.)

== Life ==
Moniuszko was born into a noble landowning family in Ubiel, (Note: The Moniuszko family had roots in the area of Goniądz in Podlachia.) Minsk Governorate (Russian Empire, now Belarus). His father, Czesław, and his uncle, Ignacy, both served in Napoleon’s army. His first piano teacher was his mother, Elżbieta (Elizabeth) Madżarska of Armenian descent. He later continued his musical education in Warsaw and Minsk, and studied under Carl Friedrich Rungenhagen in Berlin.

In 1840, he married Aleksandra Mueller, with whom he had ten children, and settled down in Vilnius, taking up the position of organist at the Church of St. John's. Moniuszko also offered private music lessons, which turned out to be an important source of income for his family. His first operettas Loteria (Lottery) and Żółta szlafmyca (Yellow Nightcap) were not very successful. However, in 1847, the premiere staging of Halka (the two-act version), considered one of his most notable operas, was more successful. It took place in Vilnius and was conducted by the composer himself. Moniuszko travelled to Sankt Petersburg in order to introduce its audiences to his music. They were received with acclaim and had favourable reviews. During his stay there, Moniuszko became acquainted with some of the leading composers and musicians of Russia, including Mikhail Glinka, Alexander Dargomyzhsky, César Cui, and Alexander Serov.

In 1854, he established St Cecilia's Society with the assistance of Achilles Bonoldi, its amateur members giving two public concerts twice a year. Owing to the composer's good relations with Warsaw's bourgeoisie and aristocracy, such as Józef Sikorski, editor-in-chief of the music magazine Ruch Muzyczny, Moniuszko's career started to gain momentum. In 1858, he moved with his family to Warsaw where he was appointed conductor at the Warsaw Opera. During the Warsaw period, he composed his most famous musical works – the operas The Countess, Verbum nobile, The Haunted Manor and Paria.

Between 1862–1864, Moniuszko worked on The Haunted Manor, arguably his greatest opera. The premiere performance of the opera was delayed by the outbreak of the January Uprising of 1863 and ultimately took place on 28 September 1865 at the Grand Theatre in Warsaw. In 1868, Moniuszko travelled to Prague where he met Bedřich Smetana in order to discuss the staging of Halka. The same year, the opera was performed at the National Theatre in Prague and was directed by Smetana himself. In 1869, his opera Paria premiered in Warsaw while Halka was staged for the first time in Moscow. He also served as a professor at the Warsaw Conservatory.

In 1871, he published Pamiętnik do nauki harmonii (A Textbook for Studying Harmony). On 2 February 1878, the Grand Theatre in Warsaw staged his last operetta Beata. He died of a heart attack in Warsaw in 1872 and was buried at the Powązki Cemetery. His funeral was attended by up to 100,000 people and turned into a national and patriotic manifestation.

== Works ==
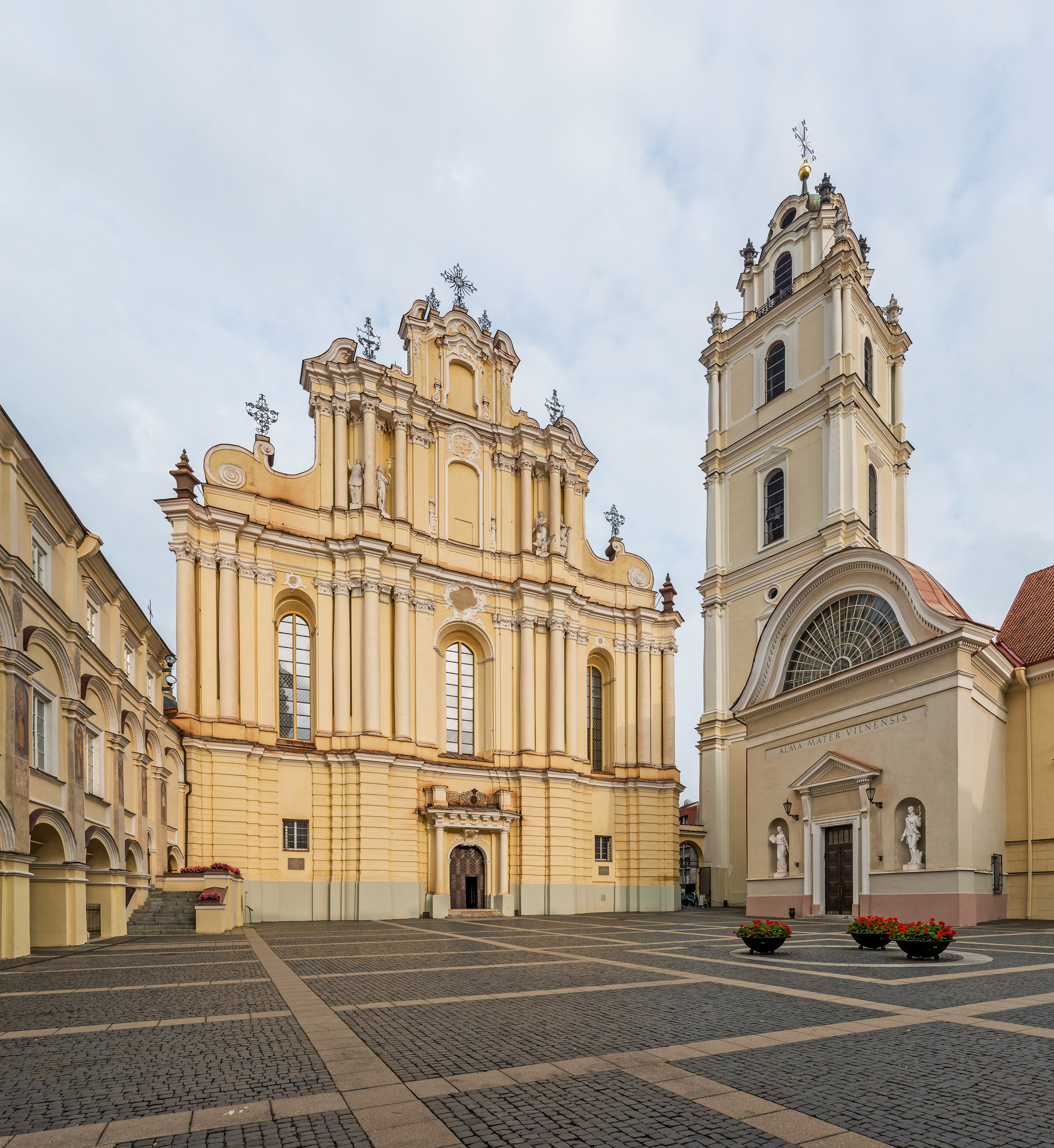
Church of St. Johns in Vilnius where Moniuszko worked as an organist.

Moniuszko composed more than 300 individual songs, primarily to texts of Polish poets, and around two dozen operas. His series of twelve song books is notable and contains songs to the words of Adam Mickiewicz, Antoni Edward Odyniec, Józef Ignacy Kraszewski, Stefan Witwicki, Antoni Malczewski, and Wincenty Pol.

Similarly to other prominent composers of the time, like Bedřich Smetana or Antonín Dvořák, Moniuszko wrote music based on his country's culture, reflecting the widespread rise of nationalism in 19th-century Europe, which aimed at asserting the national identities of various European nations. The composer himself noted that his songs, which were published under the collective title Śpiewnik Domowy (Home Songbook), had a national character. Their 'Polishness' is found in his use of and reference to traditional Polish dance rhythms like Polonaise, Mazurka, Kujawiak, and Krakowiak and the propagation of texts written by Polish national poets. The songbook contained sets of songs intended "for everyday use", which turned Moniuszko into a figure loved and admired by masses of his compatriots. The songs were often performed by the 19th-century Polish choirs in Austria, Germany, and Russia, and became a point of reference for other Polish composers. The songs remain popular to this day and include such titles as Prząśniczka, Krakowiak, Znasz-li ten kraj or Świtezianka.

According to director Ilaira Lanzino, the composer had always been interested in people excluded from society, a point of view which back in Moniuszko's times was often interpreted as Poland's oppression by foreign powers. However, she further observes that he was rather interested in the internal exclusion of people within society and never actually sought to become "the national composer".

Moniuszko's opera style bears similarities to that of Daniel Auber and Gioachino Rossini, but with stronger emphasis on chorus and melodies inspired by Polish dances. Lithuanians stress, that Stanisław Moniuszko was eagerly using Lithuanian motifs – e.g. his cantatas "Milda", "Nijolė", based on Lithuanian mythology, were issued in Vilnius.

Halka is an opera to a libretto written by Włodzimierz Wolski, a young Warsaw poet with radical social views. After being staged in Warsaw in 1858, it became the most widely known Polish opera and is part of the canon of Polish national operas.

== Modern performances ==
An English version of Straszny dwór (The Haunted Manor, or The Haunted Castle) was created and premiered by the student operatic society at Bristol University in 1970; this version has been performed since, specifically in 2001 by Opera South, which company also presented the world premiere of a specially created new English version of Verbum Nobile in 2002.

In 2009, Pocket Opera, of San Francisco, CA, USA, premiered Artistic Director Donald Pippin's English language translation of The Haunted Manor; and in 2010, Pippin's translation of Halka.

Moniuszko's opera Flis (The Raftsman) was performed and recorded in the Grand Theatre of Polish National Opera at the 2019 Chopin and his Europe International Music Festival, marking the 200th anniversary of Moniuszko's birth.

Paria was performed at Poznań Opera in June 2019, directed by Graham Vick and conducted by Gabriel Chmura.

Moniuszko's operas are regularly performed at the Belarusian National Opera.

== Remembrance ==
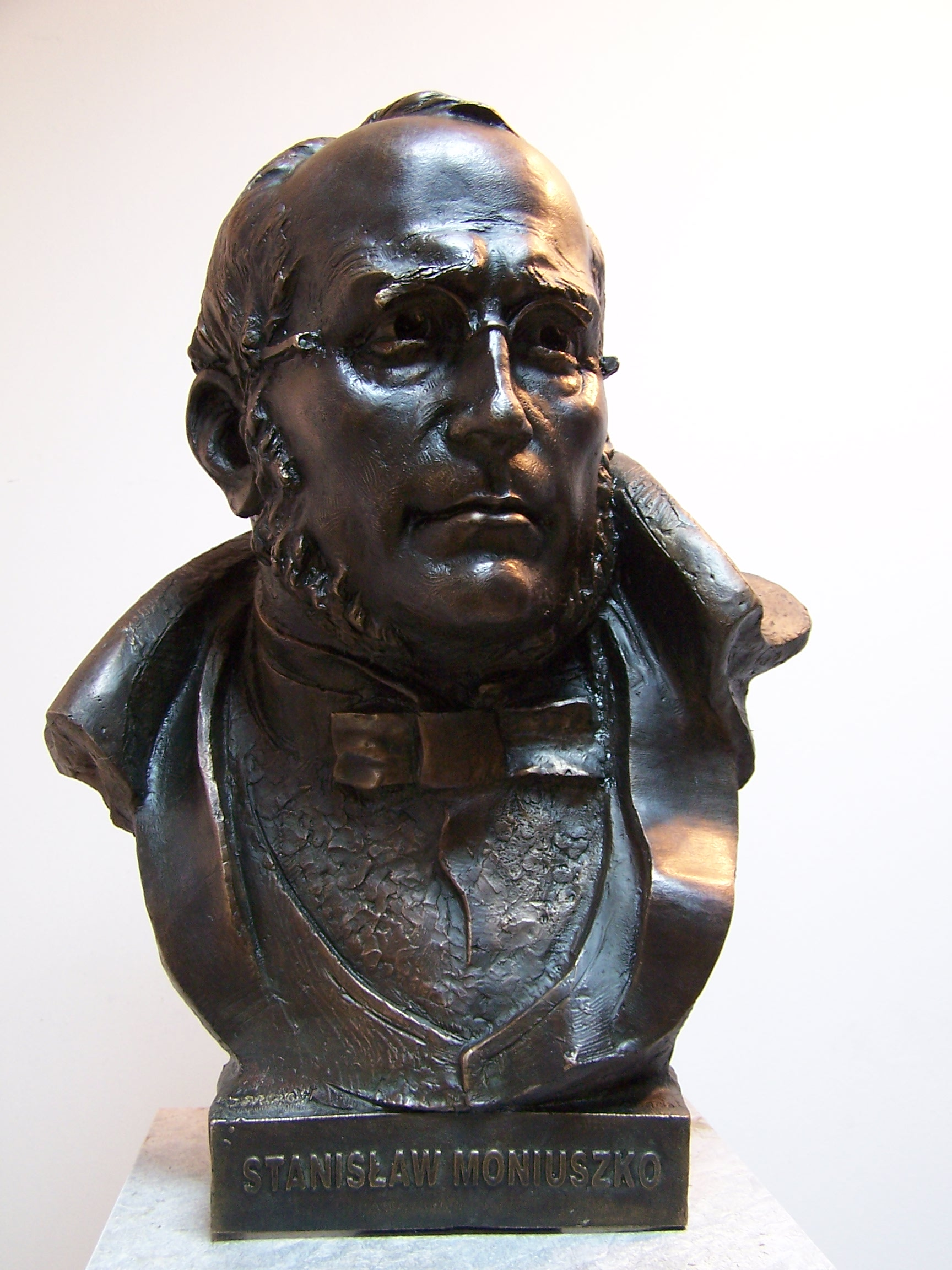
Bronze bust of Stanisław Moniuszko by Gennadij Jerszow, at the Music Academy in Gdansk.

- On 26 October 1908, a commemorative plaque devoted to Moniuszko was unveiled at the building on 3 Mazowiecka Street in Warsaw where the composer died.
- In 1922, a sculpture of Moniuszko created by Bolesław Bałzukiewicz was unveiled at the Church of St. Catherine in Vilnius, Lithuania.
- In 1936, a statue of Moniuszko designed by Jan Szczepkowski was unveiled at the Theatre Square (Polish: Plac Teatralny) in front of the Grand Theatre in Warsaw, Poland. In 1944, during World War II, the original monument was destroyed by Nazi Germans. It was subsequently reconstructed in 1965, a year after the sculptor's death. Apart from Warsaw, the statues of Moniuszko can also be found in such Polish cities as Katowice, Toruń, Częstochowa, Racibórz, Żory and Łódź.
- A sculpture of the composer is featured on the façade of the Hungarian State Opera House, Budapest, at Andrássy 22 Street and was created by Károly Antal.
- In 1949, the Grand Theatre in Poznań was officially given the name of the composer.
- Since 1951, the Warsaw Music Society, established in 1871 on the initiative of Władysław Wiślicki, has borne the name of Stanisław Moniuszko. The society owns most of the Moniuszko memorabilia which has been preserved to present times.
- In 1980s, a museum dedicated to the life and musical legacy of Moniuszko was established in his birthplace of Ubiel, present-day Belarus.
- Between 1990–1996, Moniuszko was featured on the 100,000-zloty banknote issued by the National Bank of Poland.
- Stanisław Moniuszko is a patron of many streets in numerous Polish cities including Warsaw, Łódź, Poznań, Gdańsk, Białystok, Olsztyn, Bytom, Radom and Giżycko.
- In 2004, a street named in honour of the composer was opened in Minsk, Belarus.
- In 2016, a statue of Moniuszko (alongside the statue of Vintsent Dunin-Martsinkyevich) was ceremonially unveiled nearby the Minsk City Hall. The statue was designed by Leu and Siarhei Humileusky.
- In 2018, the Sejm of Poland and the Senate of Poland established 2019 as "The Year of Moniuszko" to commemorate the composer's 200th birth anniversary.
- The images of Moniuszko also appeared on a number of postage stamps issued by the Polish Post including in 1951, 1958, 1972, and 2019.
- On 5 January 2019, the Warszawa Centralna railway station was officially given the name of Stanisław Moniuszko.

== Selected compositions ==
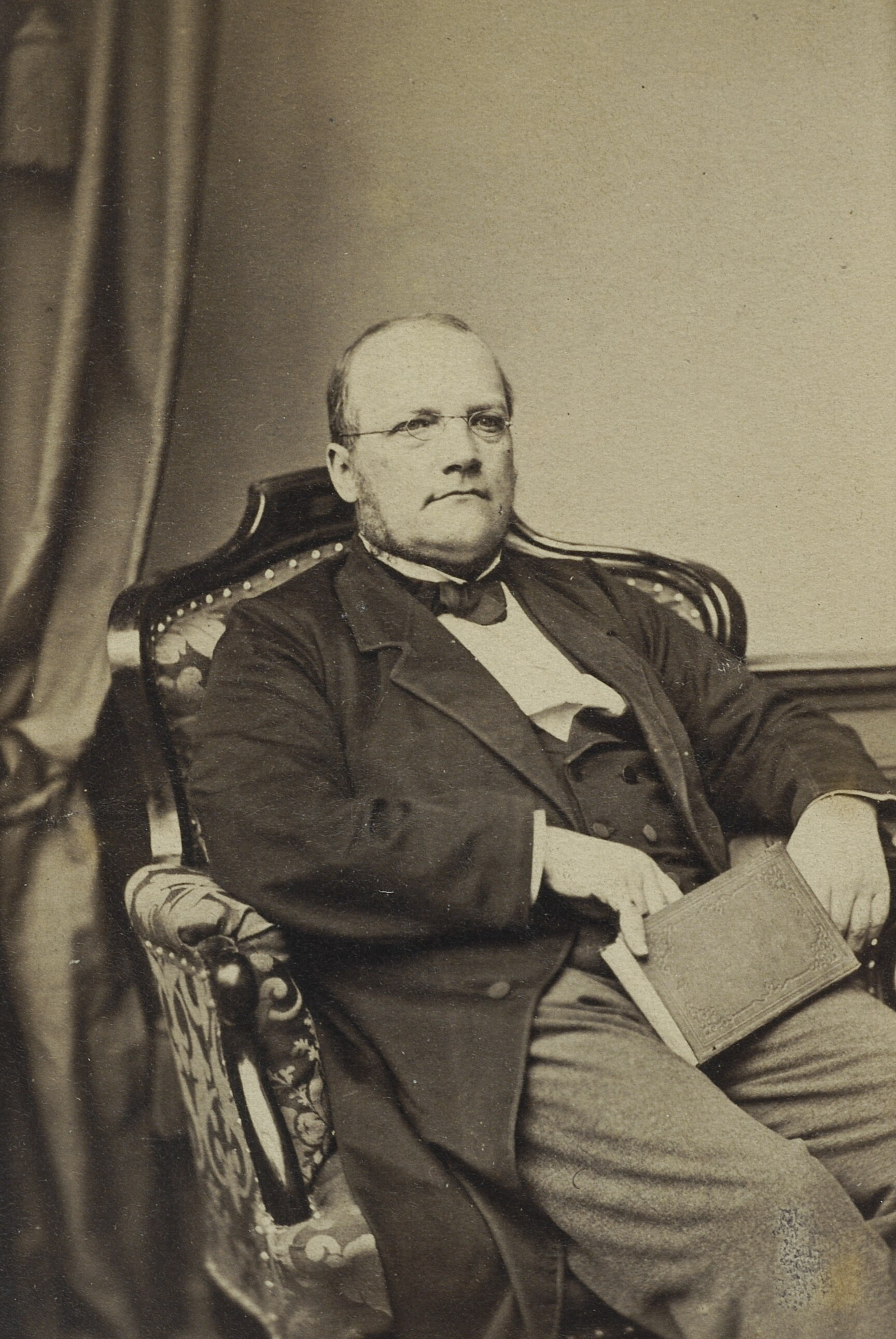
Moniuszko in 1865

=== Operas ===
- Halka, libretto by Włodzimierz Wolski, 1848
- Sen Wieszcza (The Seer's Dream), libretto by Władysław Syrokomla, unfinished, 1852–1854
- Flis (The Raftsman), libretto by Stanisław Bogusławski, 1858
- Rokiczana (The King of Peasants), libretto by Józef Korzeniowski, unfinished, 1858–1859
- Hrabina (The Countess) libretto by Włodzimierz Wolski, 1860
- Verbum nobile, libretto by Jan Chęciński, 1861
- The Haunted Manor, libretto by Jan Chęciński, 1865
- Paria, libretto by Jan Chęciński, 1868
- Trea, libretto by J.S. Jasiński, unfinished, 1872

=== Ballets ===
- Monte Christo, 1865
- Na kwaterunku, 1868
- Figle szatana, 1870

=== Operettas ===
- Nocleg w Apeninach, libretto by Aleksander Fredro, 1839
- Ideał, libretto by Oskar Korwin-Milewski, 1840
- Loteria, libretto by Oskar Korwin-Milewski, 1840
- Karmaniol, czyli Francuzi lubią żartować, libretto by Oskar Korwin-Milewski, 1841
- Żółta szlafmyca, libretto by Franciszek Zabłocki, 1841
- Jawnuta, libretto by W.L. Anczyc, 1850
- Bettly, libretto by Franciszek Szober, 1852
- Beata, libretto by Jan Chęciński, 1870

=== Cantatas ===
- Milda, 1848
- Nijoła, 1848
- Widma, c. 1858
- Florian Szary, 1858–1859
- Sonety krymskie, 1867
- Pani Twardowska, 1869

=== Chamber ===
- String Quartet No. 1 in D minor, 1839
- String Quartet No. 2 in F major, c. 1840
