= Old Spaghetti Factory Cafe =

San Francisco restaurant (1956–1984)

- Interactive map of the Old Spaghetti Factory Cafe area

General information
- Status: Used for other businesses
- Location: 478 Green Street, San Francisco, California, United States
- Coordinates: 37.7999°N 122.4071°W
- Year built: 1908
- Renovated: 1956
- Closed: 1984

Design and construction
- Architect: Unknown

San Francisco Designated Landmark
- Designated: 1981-06-07
- Reference no.: 127

The Old Spaghetti Factory Cafe, officially known as the Old Spaghetti Factory and Excelsior Coffee House at the time of opening, is a historic commercial building, first built for industrial purposes in 1908, located in North Beach, San Francisco, California, United States. It was converted from a spaghetti factory to a nightclub, coffee house, and restaurant by Frederick Walter Kuh in 1956 after it was heavily damaged in a fire several years earlier. It was listed as San Francisco Designated Landmark number 127 on June 7, 1981.

It was known for being a center of beatnik culture, hosting a variety of live performances of music and comedy, decorated with Kuh's large personal collection of Victorian furniture on its interior. The business ran until 1984, excluding an approximately year-long period where the main building was shut down for fire code violations, when Kuh retired and sold the restaurant and its furnishings.

== History ==
The building that would later become the Old Spaghetti Factory Cafe was originally a "barn like, wood-frame building", first constructed after the 1906 San Francisco earthquake. It was first used to manage imported olive oil and cheese; it was later used as a factory for bottling seltzer water. Before it became the restaurant, it was owned by three Italian-American men named Baccigalupi, Casaretto, and Demartini, who operated a spaghetti factory out of it. The building was heavily damaged in a fire in January 1954, requiring later remodeling. Richard Whalen, a local artist and friend of Kuh, claimed Kuh had been attending a party across the street from the building while it was on fire, and voiced plans to buy it if it were vacated afterwards.

Frederick "Freddie" Walter Kuh was born to a Jewish-German family in Chicago, Illinois, in 1927. His father was a stock broker, and his mother a teacher. He had attended the University of Illinois before graduating from Lake Forest College. He was a World War II veteran, having served in the mechanized cavalry division in the North African campaign, despite not knowing how to drive or ride a horse; he was transferred to the infantry after he ran over a superior officer, breaking their arm. After the end of the war, he spent time studying the arts in Paris.

Kuh first moved to San Francisco in 1954, where he worked at a nightclub, The Purple Onion. He opened the Old Spaghetti Factory Cafe, also described as a nightclub and a cabaret club, after pressure from friends over finding a new place to store his collection of Victorian style furniture in 1956. In June, Kuh placed a legal notice in The San Francisco News stating his intention to begin selling alcohol after a short waiting period, and initial reports suggested a planned opening day of August 1.

It was first open to the general public for business during the third week of October 1956, (Note: Conflicting sources have given the opening date as October 16, October 19, October 20, and October 21.) seemingly due to issues obtaining the liquor license. The full, official name at the time was the "Old Spaghetti Factory and Excelsior Coffee House". (Note: Also referred to as the "Old Spaghetti Factory Cafe and Excelsior Coffee House" in contemporary sources.) Kuh originally co-owned the restaurant with James "Jim" Silverman, but Silverman, described by Caen as "an original Beatnik-hater", sold his share of ownership to Kuh by 1961.

Kuh recruited his friend George Donald Currie, who had experience running a nightclub in Paris after World War II, to run the kitchen. The restaurant quickly became a popular hangout spot, and Kuh was later said to be the "father of funk" by journalist Herb Caen. It was a popular gathering spot for beatniks at the time. Spaghetti was not originally an actual menu item – it was primarily a coffee house that also served beer. Repeated customer requests from people unfamiliar with the business's intended role led to spaghetti actually being served, and the success of the menu offering lead to expansion into more traditional restaurant offerings. The Chronicle, who had previously reported on the menu's lack of its namesake dish before full opening in June, reported that it was present on the menu in a January 1, 1957 column.

=== Fire safety shutdown ===
The Old Spaghetti Factory Cafe was shut down by the fire marshal after two years of operation as a nightclub in November 1962 for violating building codes. Hosting public gatherings of 50 or more people in a three-story wooden building was classified as a code violation, regardless of any other safety precautions taken. Kuh filed an appeal to the Board of Permit Appeals in August 1963. Concerns were also raised about the number of exits from the building. One board member, George Gillin, protested that the shutdown was an "arbitrary interpretation" of the building code. Richard Whalen, who managed a flamenco performance that was shut down, complained that the restaurant was being targeted specifically, while a majority of North Beach venues would be shut down under the same rulings. Some acts, such as Donald Pippin's concerts, moved to perform directly in the smaller restaurant next door. One writer for the San Francisco Chronicle voiced concerns that the code enforcement was not consistent, and that the Old Spaghetti Factory Cafe was a victim of being in the middle.

The Board of Appeals unanimously declined to appeal the board's decision after their inspection. Gillin, who attended the inspection, complained of "atrocious" housekeeping causing immense fire risks. The building inspector had previously reported that the other North Beach venues in question had a lower capacity than 50 people, and the appeals commissioner recommended removing the top two floors of the building. The Spaghetti Factory Cafe's management complained in response that the verdict was made after an unfairly short inspection, and that other nightclubs had only obtained exemption through misrepresenting themselves as a food venue with entertainment on the side. A writer for the San Francisco Chronicle agreed, stating "anybody over 5 years old knows this is a sham".

A petition was circulated, primarily by the Flamenco troupe operating in the restaurant next door, that acquired around 5,000 signatures protesting the city's decision, including many other North Beach venue owners. The petition was not sufficient, and Kuh was given three weeks to bring the venue into compliance with the code's safety standards. He agreed to shut down the top two floors and install sprinklers, but ran into issues with the city bureaucracy; he was permitted to receive the night club license after installing the sprinklers, but the building inspector, John Goodyear, refused to issue the permit for installing the sprinklers until Kuh had the night club permit. Additionally, Kuh was the building's tenant, not the landlord. The owner, who resided in Europe at the time, reportedly had a history of refusing to make "capital improvements", such as the installation of a sprinkler system. Kuh was eventually able to sort out the bureaucratic and logistic issues, and the venue had reopened by 1964.

=== Relation to The Old Spaghetti Factory ===
In April 1971, it was reported that a restaurant named The Old Spaghetti Factory in Portland had opened, spawning a chain that featured the same theming and menu as the San Francisco location, and had applied for a trademark. One of the chain's operators, Guss Dussin, admitted to copying the name. They had originally intended to purchase naming rights, but were not willing to pay the price Kuh set for the name, and a lawsuit began. The Oregon Daily Journal characterized Dussin's objection that Kuh's version of the Old Spaghetti Factory brand started as a coffee house, not a spaghetti restaurant, a "spaghetti-like tangle of logic". Negotiations for the name were eventually successful. The first location of the restaurant chain did not open in the San Francisco Bay Area until 1988; part of the contract stipulated that they would not be allowed to open one there until Kuh's restaurant had closed.

=== Landmark status and closing ===
In May 1980, the landlord of the building the Old Spaghetti Factory Cafe occupied died, leaving management of approximately 40 parcels of land around San Francisco to two of his cousins in France. By December 1980, the lots received a probate sale managed by Wells Fargo. Kuh intended to place a bid, but knew he would not be able to place a winning offer. The price after appraisal was $2.5 million, which he estimated to be more than twice that which the rent could warrant, and expected the new owner to end up tearing down whatever was built on the lots. An effort emerged to get the old factory building designated as a landmark to protect it from demolition after ownership changed, led by Mary Burns, the manager of one of Kuh's other propeties, the Savoy Tivoli. Landmark status was eventually granted, although Burns complained of "an obvious political maneuver" being pulled in the process to delay the hearing that would grant it a one-year protection against demolition. The proposal was approved by the Board of Supervisors on April 27, 1981, and it was listed as Designated Landmark number 127 on June 7, 1981. The landmark designation granted a degree of protection for the building. Any changes to its exterior would have to be approved by the landmark advisory board, and demolition permits could be delayed by up to one year. At the time, no buildings that had been listed as a city landmark had ever been demolished.

In October 1981, Herb Caen reported that Kuh had managed to buy the building by selling his Telegraph Hill house and taking out a loan, thus saving it from demolition. However, by January 1983 he had sold the Savoy Tivoli and was said to be looking for a buyer for the Old Spaghetti Factory Cafe. He was ultimately unable to find a buyer for it, so the restaurant was closed and sold off, with the decorations sold at a liquidation auction, as he retired in March 1984. Over 700 items were sold to several hundred bidders (estimates ranged from over 350 to over 500), including the bar itself (for $18,000) and the liquor license (for $27,500). Butterfield & Butterfield, the auctioneering company in charge of the event, estimated the total value of the goods sold to be nearly $100,000 (equivalent to $309,898 in 2025). The last show performed was a comedy special by Darryl Henriques and Geoff Hoyle, as a benefit for the Pickle Family Circus, ending on March 17, 1984.

Kuh died at the age of 70 from a cerebral hemorrhage at his residence in St. Helena, France on November 6, 1997. His home in France had a large collection of art, collectables, and various memorabillia that was sold by a Bay Area auction house over a period of four months in 1998.

== Legacy ==
Robin Williams performed at the Old Spaghetti Factory Cafe early in his career, and participated in a "Save the Old Spaghetti Factory!" benefit in 1980. Adlai Stevenson II used it as an "unofficial local headquarters" for his 1956 presidential campaign. The Macaroni Show, a 1962 variety show that evolved into Beach Blanket Babylon, and Donald Pippin's Pocket Opera started in the "Blue Noodle Room" at the Old Spaghetti Factory Cafe. Pippin received a benefit concert there in 1962 to help raise funds to pay off medical bills he received during (successful) treatment of a tumor in one of his arms. The Old Spaghetti Factory Cafe influenced the careers of other San Francisco restaurateurs, such as Alan Palmer and Ruben Medina, who were employed there.

The new owner of the building that housed the Old Spaghetti Factory Cafe was issued a cease and desist order for modifying a Historic Landmark building without proper approval on February 1, 1985, the first time that any incidents had happened since the system had been established. He was fined $500 (equivalent to $1,497 in 2025) for each day that the building was in non-compliance.

In an article that ran in the San Francisco Business Journal in 1985, Nancy Peters viewed the closure of the Old Spaghetti Factory Cafe as emblematic of the end of an era in North Beach, as a wooden sculpture that was in front of the restaurant was destroyed with an axe. Rising rents for commercial were seen as pricing local businesses out of operation, as chain businesses with larger cash reserves were considered to be more reliable by landlords.

A 2010 paper by Tony Dumas for the Pacific Review of Ethnomusicology credited the Old Spaghetti Factory Cafe for helping to establish a social network of Flamenco dancers for a duration of nearly 30 years, creating a local identity for flamenco.

=== Successors ===
Various other restaurants have been established in the landmark building in the years after closing. Parts of the building were leased separately; the main part, considered the "heart and soul of the Old Spaghetti Factory" by Chronicle writer Patricia Unterman, was occupied by a restaurant named Cars; the other tenant was the Telegraph Hill Bistro. Cars was founded by a man named Pascal Chevillot, and was opened for business before the end of 1984; the Telegraph Hill Bistro was opened by March 1985. By 1987, Cars was replaced with RAF (also known as RAF Centrogriglia), an upscale Italian restaurant. Cars had featured a prop police car crashed through a wall, while RAF was minimalist and rustic in its interior design (although the design of its waiters uniforms, black shirts with "RAF" stamped on them, was criticized).

The longest-lasting successor took over operations after RAF. A local chain of Humphrey Bogart-themed restaurants established a "Bogie's" location within the landmark building in 1990, which had opened their first location in San Mateo in 1982. A following cease-and-desist order from the Bogart estate resulted in the owner, Ugur, changing the name to Bocce in May 1991 before selling off the San Francisco location the following year. Then known as the Bocce Cafe, it operated continuously until it was replaced by a gastropub, The Barbary Coast, in April 2016; it did not have the same longevity, closing in January the following year. A Mexican restaurant, Equal Parts, was opened in December 2025 (following an Iranian-operated restaurant named American Bites), and is the current resident as of 2026.
