= Parsons Restaurant =

American-influenced restaurant in London

Coordinates: 51.4868°N 0.1793°W

Parsons Old Spaghetti Factory and Coffee House
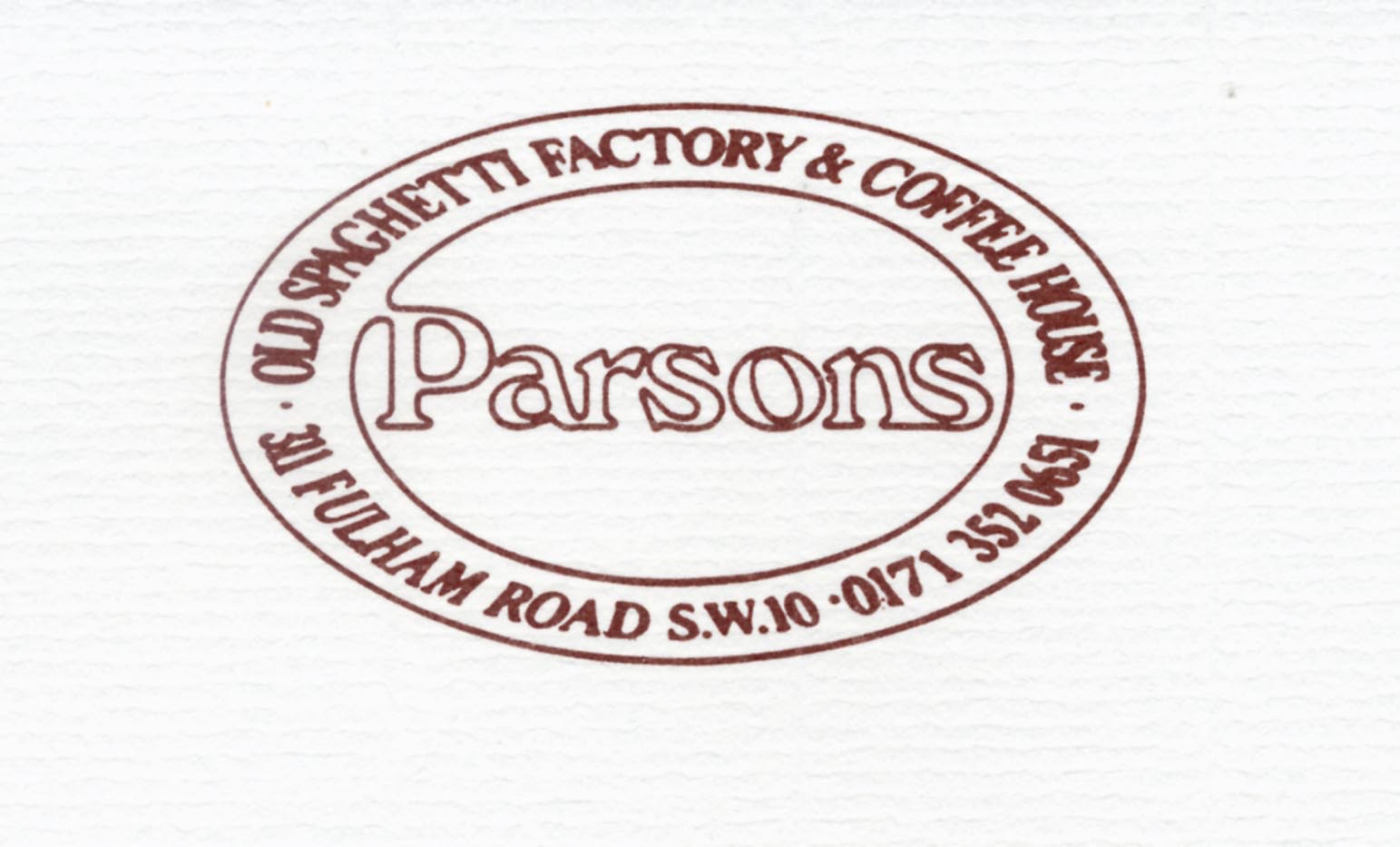
- Restaurant Logo
- Interactive map of Parsons Old Spaghetti Factory and Coffee House

Restaurant information
- Established: 2 December 1970
- Closed: 3 August 1997
- Location: 311 Fulham Road, London, United Kingdom

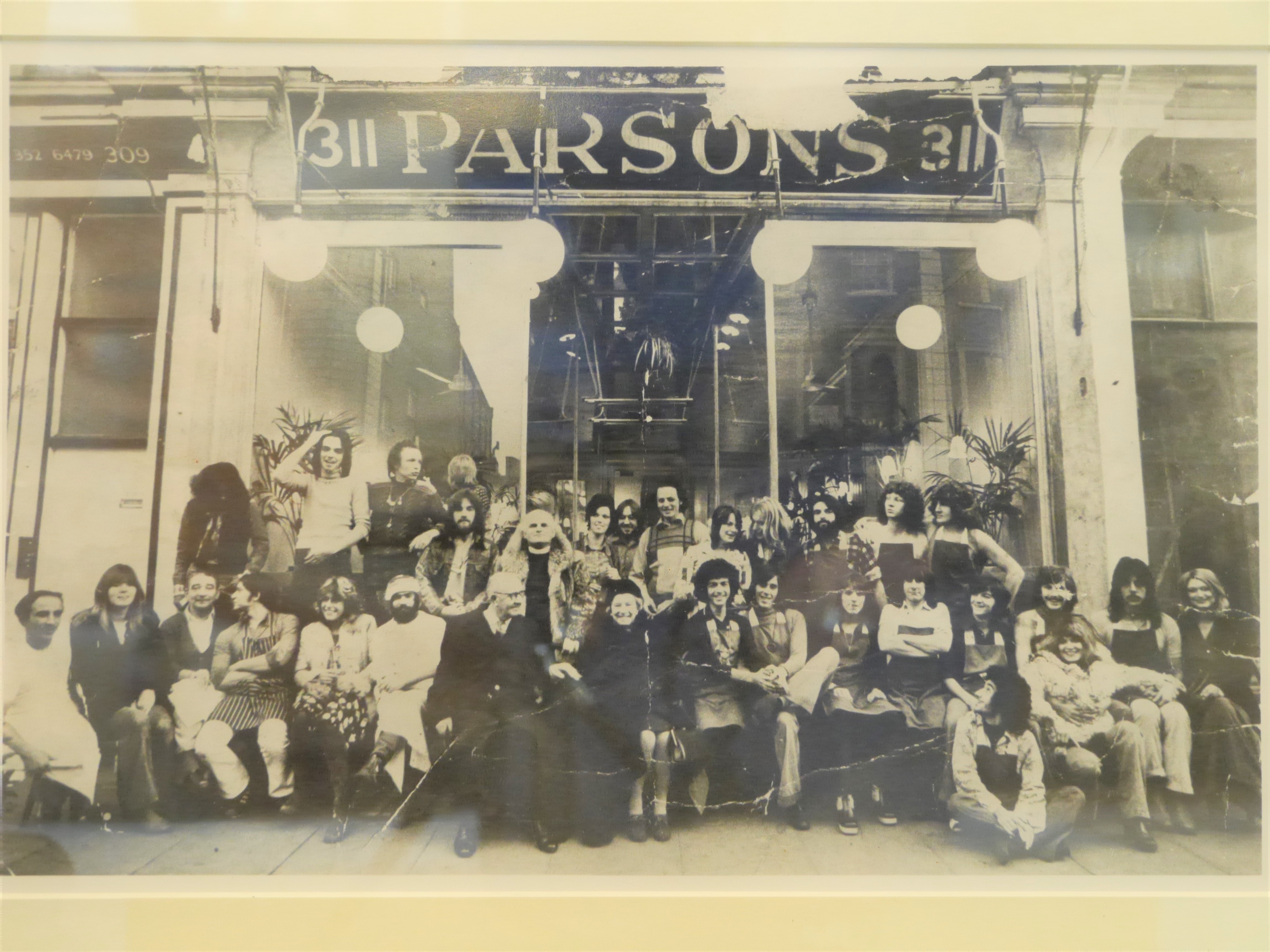
Parsons' first anniversary

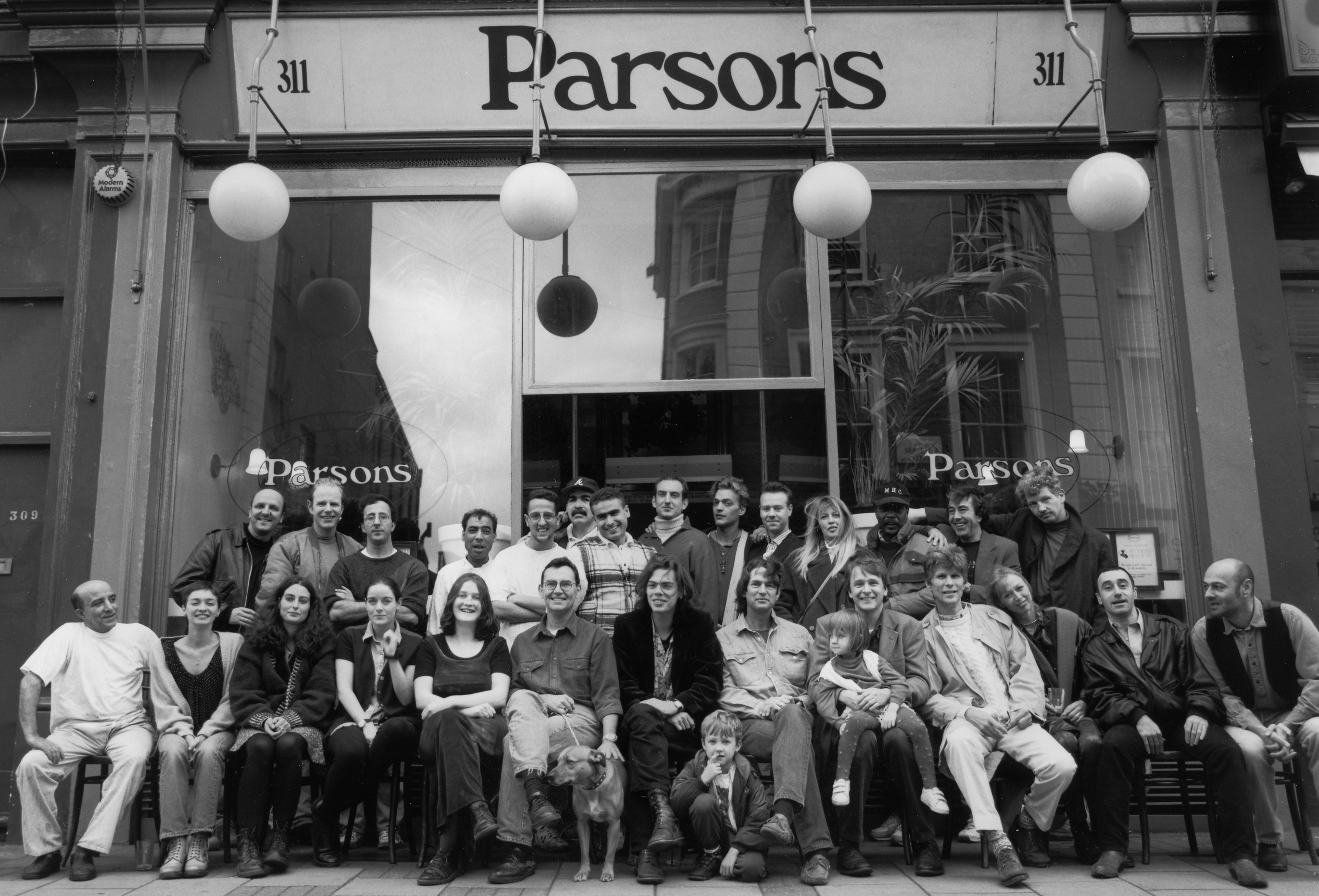
Parsons' 21st anniversary

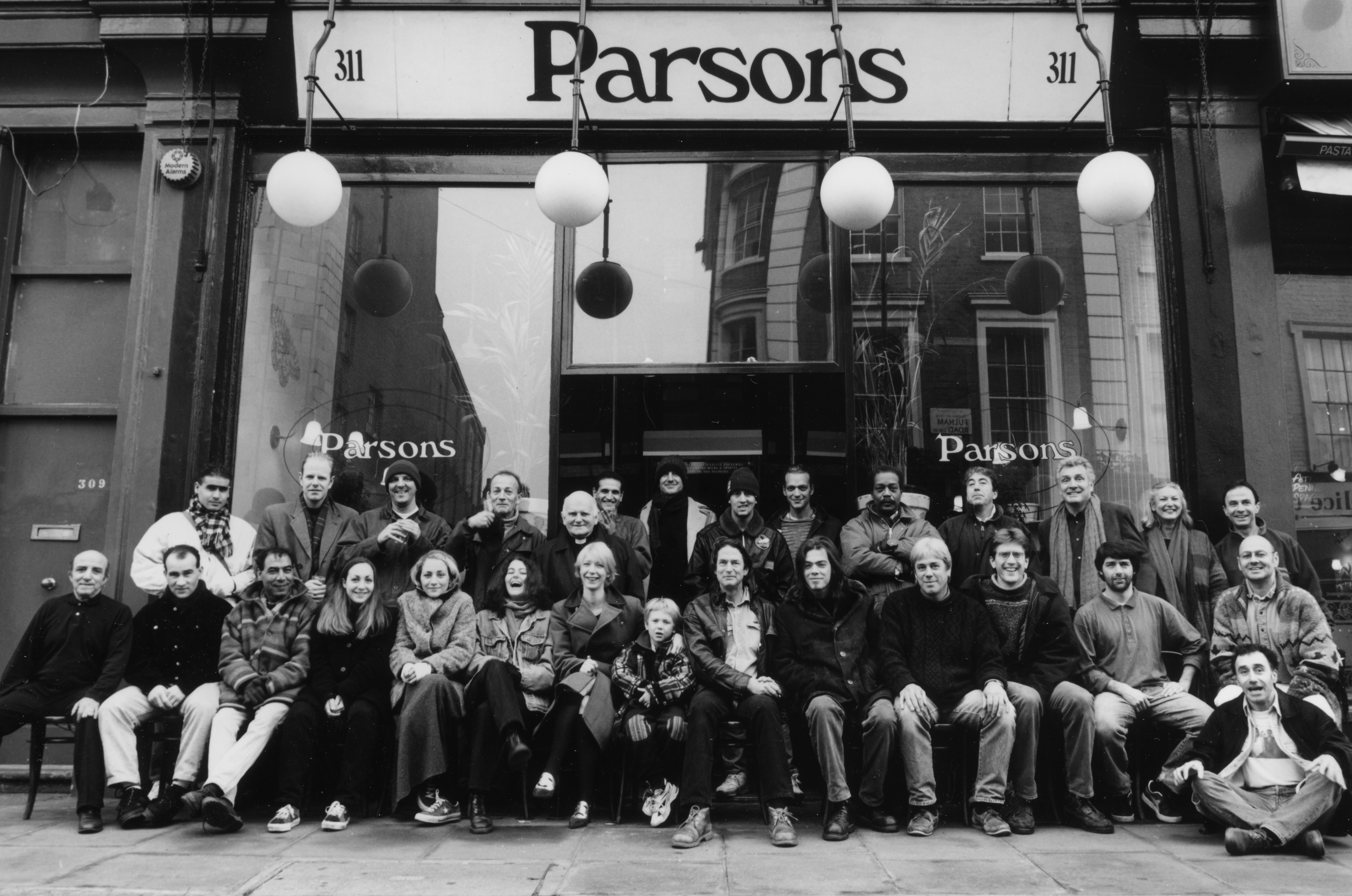
Parsons' last group photograph

Parsons Restaurant (full name: Parsons Old Spaghetti Factory and Coffee House) at 311 Fulham Road in London opened on 2 December 1970 and closed on 3 August 1997. It was started by two architects, Alexander Neel and Michael Tickner, who had met while doing a year out of their course in San Francisco – they were impressed with a restaurant there called the Old Spaghetti Factory Cafe and Coffee House and decided that it was exactly what London needed in 1970.

Michael Tickner, one of the two architects, designed the "look" – large Victorian mirrors, Victorian tip-top tables, bentwood chairs, potted palms, hanging ferns, ceiling fans, swan-neck lamps, and butterflies on the walls. Tickner had previously helped to design the first BIBA.

Very few eateries in London in the 1960s had been designed for young people. Two of them were just down the road: the first PizzaExpress (Peter Boizot), and The Great American Disaster (Peter Morton) who later founded the Hard Rock Cafe with Isaac Tigrett), which was the first place in London to sell authentic American burgers. Parsons was one of the leaders in this trend for casual dining, becoming instantly fashionable, with queues forming in the street outside and strangers sharing tables inside.

The waiting staff were as young and trendy – some of them also from America, dodging the Vietnam draft – as the clientele, and the atmosphere in the evenings was glamorous and electric, a constant party to the background of loud funky music and the "in" crowd hosted by Tickner at one of the large tables in the shopfront. The theatrical setting was as much the attraction as the food. The concept was much copied, in particular by Browns Restaurants in Brighton in 1973, which even adopted the unusual shape of the menu, and was subsequently replicated as a formula by Browns in a number of other cities in the UK.

Early reviews of the food were not particularly enthusiastic; Quentin Crewe praised the décor but was lukewarm about the spaghetti. In 1972 Humphrey Lyttelton liked the friendliness of the staff and the good value. The décor and ambience were praised by Vogue and Time Out.

As the business matured the food improved, and it was an early adopter of the idea of traceability, buying all its meat from the mid 1980s from the Lower Hurst Farm herd of Herefords and Texels in Derbyshire, well before BSE became a problem. Jonathan Meades, writing for The Times stated "If one is going to eat hamburgers – and this one usually isn’t – Parsons is probably the place to do it."

One of the other reasons that Parsons endured was the very low turnover of staff at a time when restaurants were a byword for "bus-stop" labour. It was not unusual for them to remain for 10 years or more, possibly because the working environment was enjoyable. One Moroccan kitchen worker, "Benma" Benhmadouch, employed as a washer-up on day one, was Head Chef by the time the restaurant closed, and his brother Ahmed was also employed for nearly twenty years; together with four others they served over 100 man years at Parsons.

Number 311 was on a stretch of the Fulham Road popularly known as "The Beach". The origin of this name is a classic urban myth; first used as a humorous reference to the fashionable flaneurs of the area by Pat Connolly, who supplied meat to the restaurant prior to Lower Hurst Farm, it was relayed as established fact during an interview with Jonathan Meades, who then included the "fact" in a review, and the term became common currency.

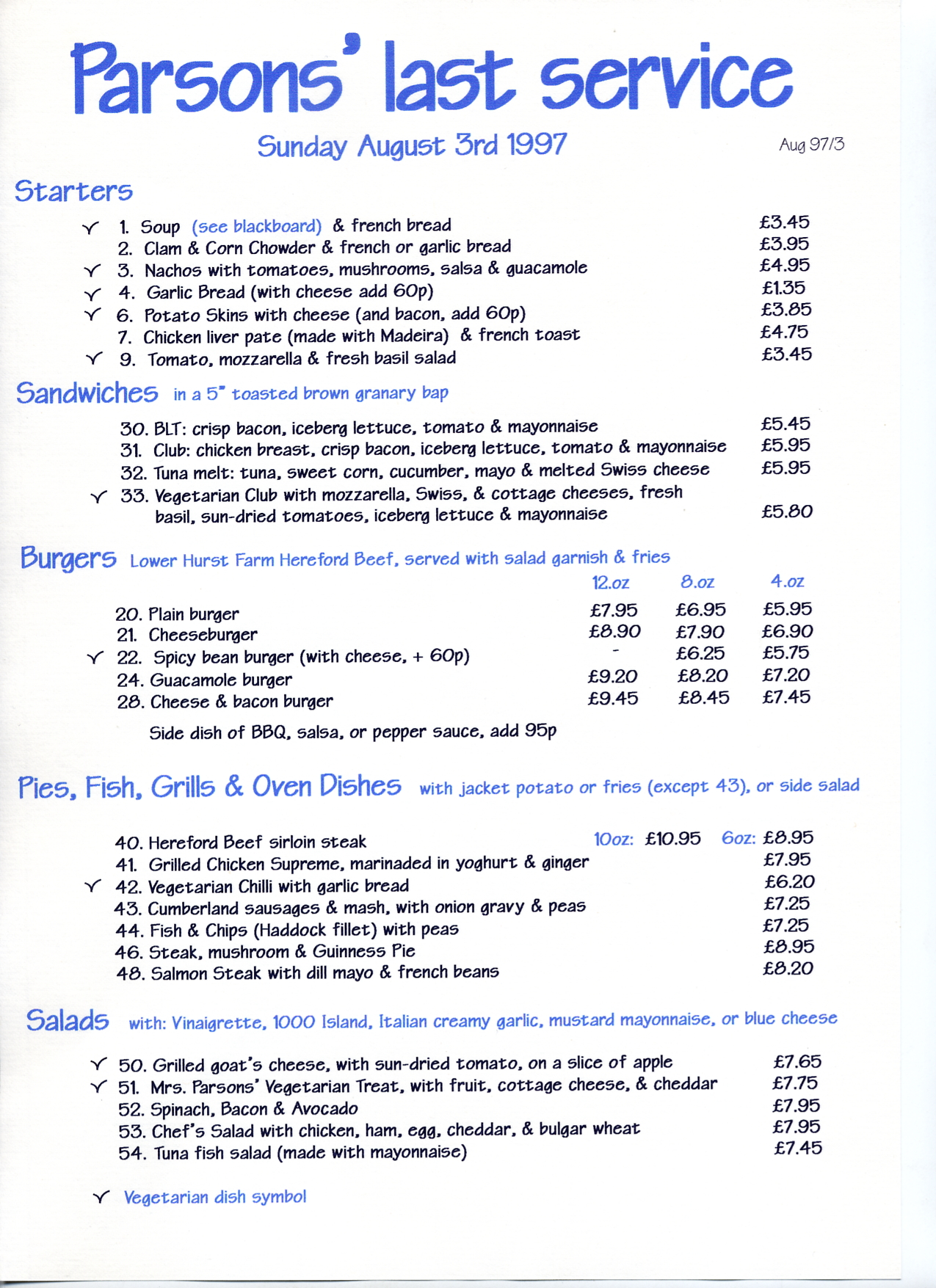
First page of Parsons' last menu
