= Jawnuta =

Jawnuta may refer to:

- Jawnuta, an opera by Stanisław_Moniuszko
- Jaunutis (c. 1300-1366), Grand Duke of Lithuania 1341-1345
