= Halka =

Opera by Stanisław Moniuszko

- Opera by Stanisław Moniuszko
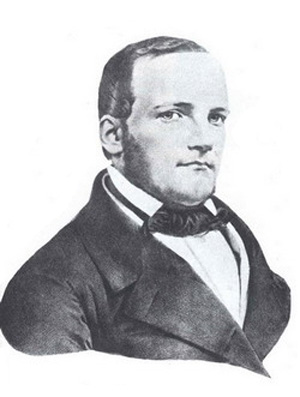
- The composer
- Librettist: Włodzimierz Wolski
- Language: Polish
- Premiere: 28 February 1854; Vilnius

Halka is an opera by Polish composer Stanisław Moniuszko to a libretto written by Włodzimierz Wolski, a young Warsaw poet with radical social views.

== Performance history ==
The first performance of the two-act version was in a concert performance in Vilnius on 1 January 1848. The staged premiere took place in the same city on 28 February 1854. A four-act version was performed in Warsaw on 1 January 1858. The opera was subsequently produced in the United States, Canada, Mexico, Japan, Turkey, Russia and Cuba.

More recently, in June 2004 the Opera has been staged in Kraków Zakrzówek Nature Park as an outdoor performance with horses, fireworks, special effects, and attendance exceeding 6,000 viewers. It was produced by Krzysztof Jasiński under the musical direction of Wojciech Michniewski, with the ballet and orchestra of the Opera Krakowska and with Ewa Biegas and Maria Mitrosz alternating in the title role. The opera has been produced again on stage of the Kraków Opera from December 2011 till February 2012 with sopranos Magdalena Barylak, Ewa Biegas, Ewa Vesin, as well as Mariusz Kwiecień.

The first performance of Halka in Britain was at POSK in London (the Polish Cultural Centre in Hammersmith) on 30 October 2009 by Heritage Opera with Serenna Wagner in the title role and Chris Gill as the musical director.

The opera was originally performed in the United States by the Polonia Opera Company under its director Louis Kowalski. He staged the opera in many cities with Polish populations, such as New York in Carnegie Hall, Detroit, Hartford and Chicago. He last staged Halka at Carnegie Hall on May 24, 1959, about 6 months before his death. He was survived by his wife, Carolyn Kowalski, his daughter Wanda and his son, Theodore.

An American performance of Halka was performed in New York City by the Bel Canto Opera in the Robert F. Wagner School Theatre in June 1982. The premiere was met with generally positive reviews by The New York Times, as well as enthusiastic review in the Polish daily on June 16, 1983.

In 2010 a new English translation by Donald Pippin was performed by Pocket Opera in San Francisco and Berkeley.

To coincide with the bicentennial of Moniuszko's birth, Theater an der Wien in Austria staged Halka to rave reviews.

Halka has been turned into Polish films in 1930 and in 1937.

== Composition ==
Musicologist Carl Dahlhaus describes Halka as "the Polish national opera". It is about the love of the title character, the highlander girl Halka, for the nobleman Janusz, who abandons her to marry someone else.

Hans von Bülow described Halka's G minor aria at the beginning of act 2 as, "Full of originality and lively passion, to which its strongly native folk element adds a special flavor...The entire gamut of erotic emotions, from the tender to the most vehement note of despair finds appropriate expression in this aria and one must genuinely congratulate the composer".

== Roles ==
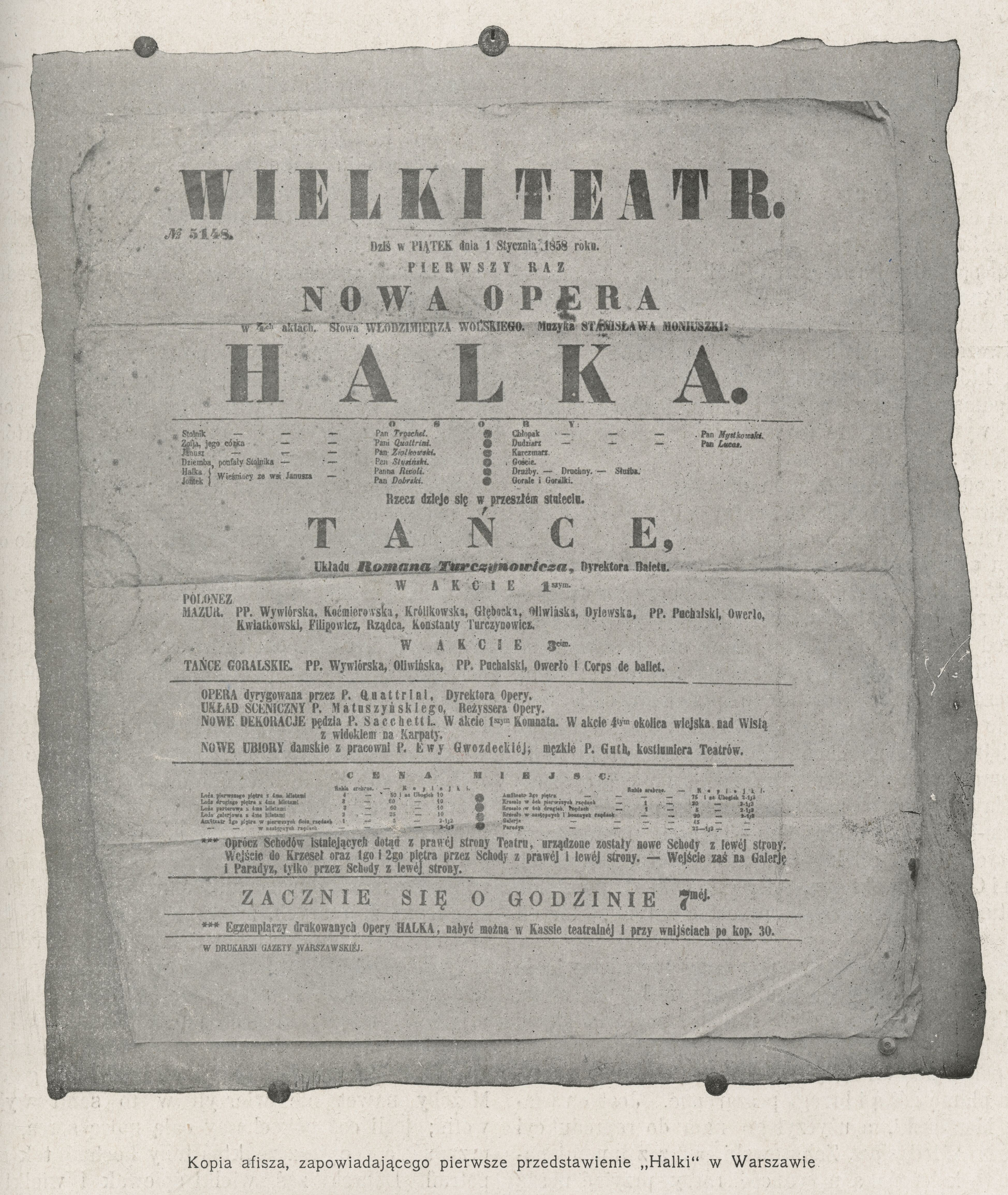
Poster for the 1858 premiere performance at the Teatr Wielki, Warsaw

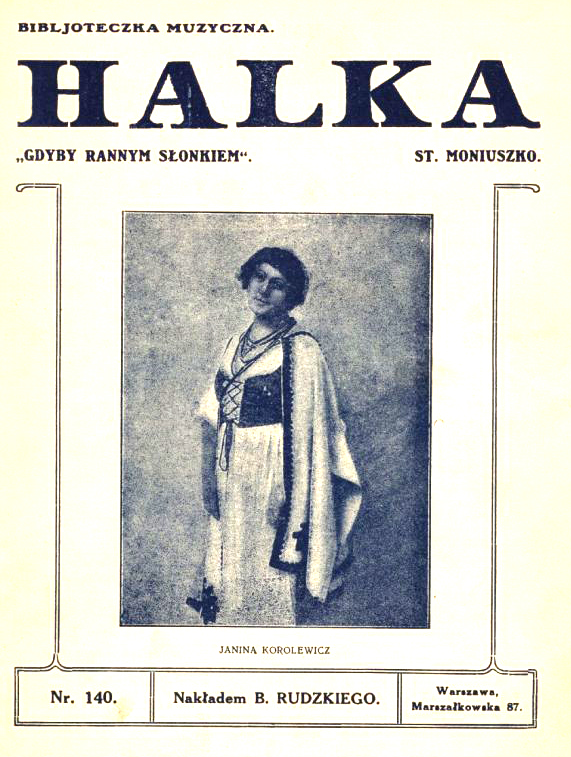
Sheet music cover of aria "If at the Morning Sun" from Halka, with illustration of soprano Janina Korolewicz (c. 1895)

Roles, voice types
Role	Voice type
Halka, a mountain-girl	soprano
Jontek, a young man of the mountains	tenor
Janusz, squire	baritone
Stolnik, master of the pantry	bass
Zofia, his daughter	mezzo-soprano
Dziemba, major-domo	bass
Goral	tenor
Chorus: Nobles, peasants

== Synopsis ==
=== Act 1 ===
Guests at an engagement party are happy to note that the wedding of Janusz, a wealthy young landowner, to Zofia, the daughter of an even wealthier landowner named Stolnik, will unite two huge estates. Zofia and Janusz celebrate a toast with Stolnik, and Stolnik calls Janusz the son he has always wanted. The party is disturbed by a plaintive wailing from outside. It seems to be a troubled young girl, crying for her lost love. The kind-hearted Zofia asks Janusz to talk to the girl, hoping he will comfort her; he reluctantly agrees.

Dziemba, the steward of Stolnik's estate, ushers in the woebegone creature. This is Halka. To the audience's surprise, she appears to know Janusz. It turns out that he himself is her lost love; he promised her marriage while in her village in the mountains but then disappeared. As soon as Halka looks into Janusz's eyes, she is convinced that his feelings for her haven't changed, despite the disquieting rumours she had heard to the contrary. Halka throws her arms around Janusz and he says that he still loves her as he did before. He tells Halka to meet him after dark at the statue of the Virgin Mary by the river; they will escape together to start a new life somewhere else. Once Halka goes out, Janusz returns to the party.

=== Act 2 ===
Halka is waiting for Janusz by the river. She is disturbed by the appearance of not Janusz, but Jontek, a friend from her mountain village. Jontek has been in (unrequited) love with Halka for many years. Halka tells him happily that Janusz still loves her, but Jontek insists that she has been betrayed. Jontek can't convince Halka until he drags her to the scene of the party, where she sees that Janusz has become engaged to Zofia. Halka is devastated and compares herself to a dove who has been ripped to pieces by a falcon.

=== Act 3 ===
Act 3 opens with happy scenes of normal life back in Halka's mountain village. The villagers are dismayed by the arrival of Jontek and an unrecognisable woman, who turns out to be the saddened Halka. They are angry when they hear about Janusz's engagement and even angrier when they realise that Halka is pregnant. Halka is in a world of her own, crushed by grief and fixated on the images of the dove being broken by the falcon. A black raven passes overhead, boding ill for everyone.

=== Act 4 ===
Jontek is very sad about Halka. When a piper, in the village to play at the wedding of Janusz and Zofia, appears playing a happy tune, Jontek asks him what there is to be so happy about. The piper mollifies him by playing a haunting mountain song. Jontek describes his love for Halka and the many wonders of nature she reminds him of.

When Janusz and Zofia arrive in the village to celebrate their wedding, the angry villagers have to be convinced to act festive by Dziemba, the steward, who persuades them to do so out of respect for the bride. Zofia notices that Halka is terribly upset. She thinks she has seen Halka somewhere before, and even asks her what's wrong. Janusz admits that Halka is the girl who interrupted their engagement party but whisks Zofia into the church before she can ask any more questions. Halka is heartbroken to see that Janusz is going through with the marriage. She has lost her baby and feels completely alone. In a fit of rage, she decides to burn down the church. However, she decides to let Janusz live and throws herself into the river instead.

== Recordings ==
- Antonina Kawecka (Halka), Wacław Domieniecki (Jontek), Marian Woźniczko (Janusz), Felicja Kurowiak (Zofia), Edmund Kossowski (Stolnik); Walerian Bierdiajew, cond., Poznań State Moniuszko Opera Choir & Orchestra; Recorded 1955, Polskie Nagrania Muza.
- Stefania Woytowicz (Halka), Wiesław Ochman (Jontek), Andrzej Hiolski (Janusz), Anna Malewicz-Maley (Zofia), Bernard Ładysz (Stolnik); Jerzy Semkow, cond., Symphonic Orchestra of Polish National Radio & Choir of the Radio-Television in Cracow; Recorded 1973, Le Chant du Monde.
- Barbara Zagórzanka (Halka), Wiesław Ochman (Jontek), Andrzej Hiolski (Janusz), Ryszarda Racewicz (Zofia), Jerzy Ostapiuk (Stolnik); Robert Satanowski, cond., Orchestra & Choir of Theater Wielki (Warsaw); Recorded 14 October 1986, Classic Produktion Osnabrück.
- Tina Gorina (Halka), Matheus Pompeu (Jontek), Robert Gierlach (Janusz), Monika Ledzion-Porczyńska (Zofia), Rafał Siwek (Stolnik); Fabio Biondi, cond., Europa Galante & Podlaskie Opera and Philharmonic Choir; Recorded 24 August 2018, Fryderyk Chopin Institute NIFCCD 082 (Italian Version).
- Magdalena Molendowska (Halka), Dominik Sutowicz (Jontek), Łukasz Goliński (Janusz) Magdalena Wilczyńska-Goś (Zofia), Rafał Korpik (Stolnik); Gabriel Chmura, cond., Poznań Opera House Orchestra & Chorus; Recorded 11 November 2019, Naxos 8.660485-86.

DVDs

- Tatiana Zakharchuk (Halka), Vladimir Kuzmenko (Jontek), Zbigniew Macias (Janusz), Katarzyna Suska (Zofia), Piotr Nowacki (Stolnik); Antoni Wicherek, cond., Orchestra & Choir of The Great Theatre National Opera in Warsaw; Recorded October 1997, ZPR Records.
- Tatiana Borodina (Halka), Oleh Lykhach (Jontek), Mariusz Godlewski (Janusz), Aleksandra Buczek (Zofia), Radosław Żukowski (Stolnik); Ewa Michnik, cond., Orchestra & Chorus of the Wrocław Opera; Recorded 8 September 2005, DUX Recording Producers DUX9538.
- Jolanta Wagner (Halka), Tadeusz Szlenkier (Jontek), Łukasz Goliński (Janusz), Dorota Sobczak (Zofia), Jacek Greszta (Stolnik); Piotr Wajrak, cond., Orchestra & Chorus of the Opera Nova in Bydgoszcz; Recorded 2019, DUX Recording Producers DUX8331.
- Corinne Winters (Halka), Piotr Beczała (Jontek), Tomasz Konieczny (Janusz), Natalia Kawałek (Zofia), Alexey Tikhomirov (Stolnik); Łukasz Borowicz, cond., ORF Radio-Symphonieorchester Wien & Arnold Schoenberg Choir; Recorded 2019, Unitel A04050122.

== Editions ==
- Stanislaw Moniuszko: Halka: opera in 4 acts, Libretto Włodzimierz Wolski, orchestral score (Warszawa 1861), facsimile edition, introduction and commentaries: Grzegorz Zieziula, vol. 1–4, Warszawa 2012: Instytut Sztuki PAN – Stowarzyszenie Liber Pro Arte, ISBN 978-83-63877-12-5, 978-83-92343-80-6; ("About the edition, based on first 1861 printing of the orchestral score", Polish Academy of Sciences).

== Notes ==
- The notes for synopsis are based on the English language translation by Donald Pippin (2010).
