= Włodzimierz Wolski =

Polish writer

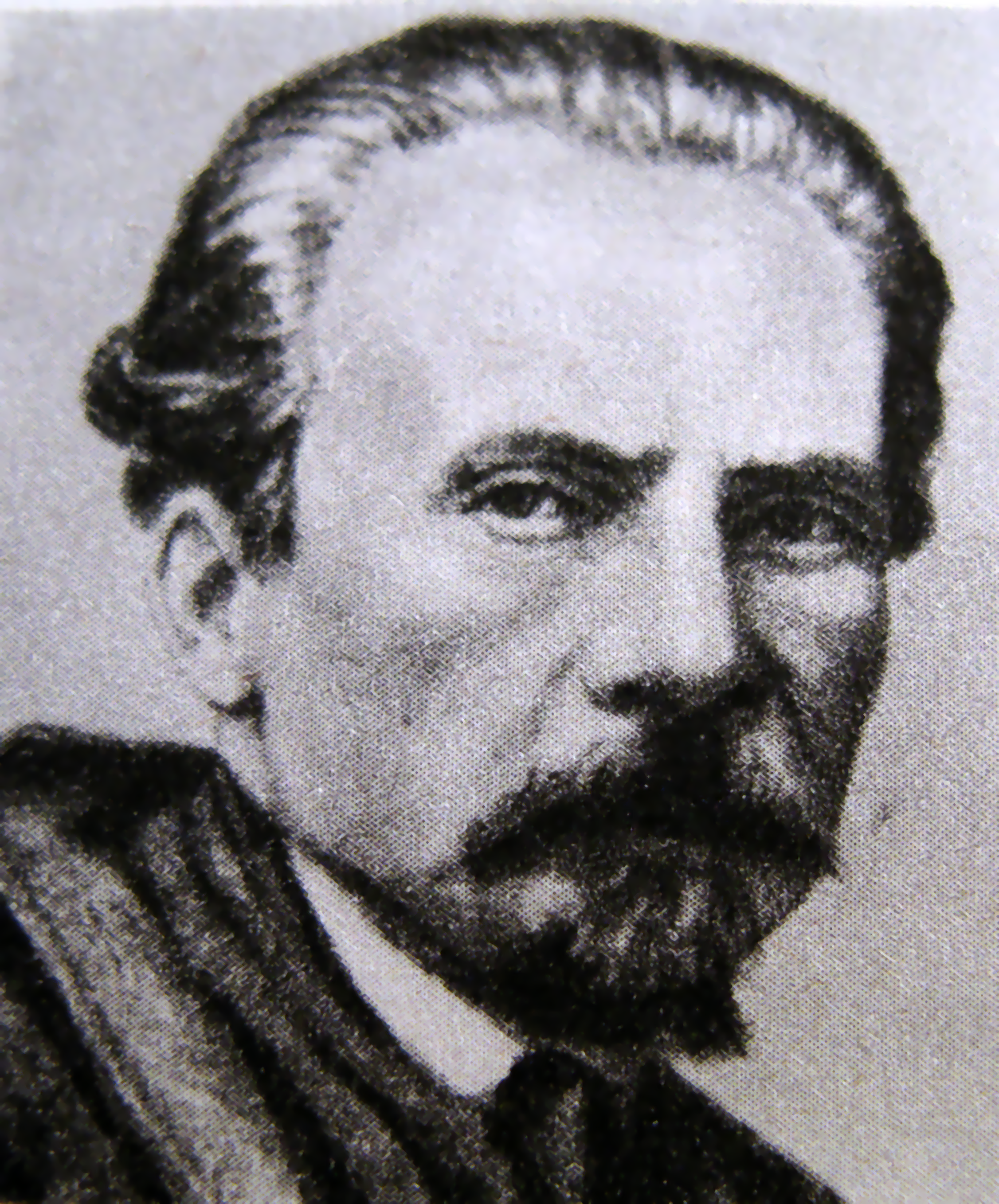
- Born: 9 October 1824; Pułtusk, Kingdom of Poland, Russian Empire
- Died: 29 July 1882 (aged 57); Brussels, Belgium
- Other name: Polski Wolski
- Occupations: Poet, Novelist, Translator, Librettist
- Notable work: Halka, Hrabina (libretta)

Włodzimierz Wolski (9 October 1824, Pułtusk – 29 July 1882, Brussels) was a Polish poet, novelist, translator, and librettist. He is best known as the author of the libretto to Stanisław Moniuszko's opera Halka.

He grew up in Warsaw and published his poems and prose in magazines there. He took part in the January Uprising and settled in Brussels after the defeat.

== Works ==
Poetry

- Ojciec Hilary (Father Hillary)
- Halka
- Połośka
- Śpiewy powstańcze (Songs of Insurgents)
- Promyki (Rays)
- Listy z Belgii (Letters from Belgium)

Librettos

- Halka
- The Countess
- Połośka gwinciarska
