= Hrabina (opera) =

Three-act opera by Stanisław Moniuszko

The Countess
- Opera by Stanisław Moniuszko
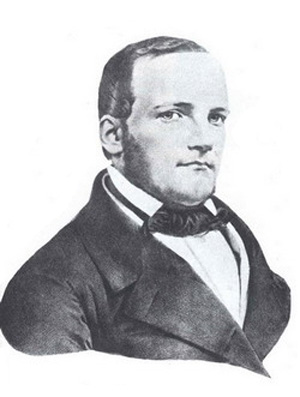
- The composer
- Native title: Hrabina
- Librettist: Włodzimierz Wolski
- Language: Polish
- Premiere: 7 February 1860; Great Theatre, Warsaw

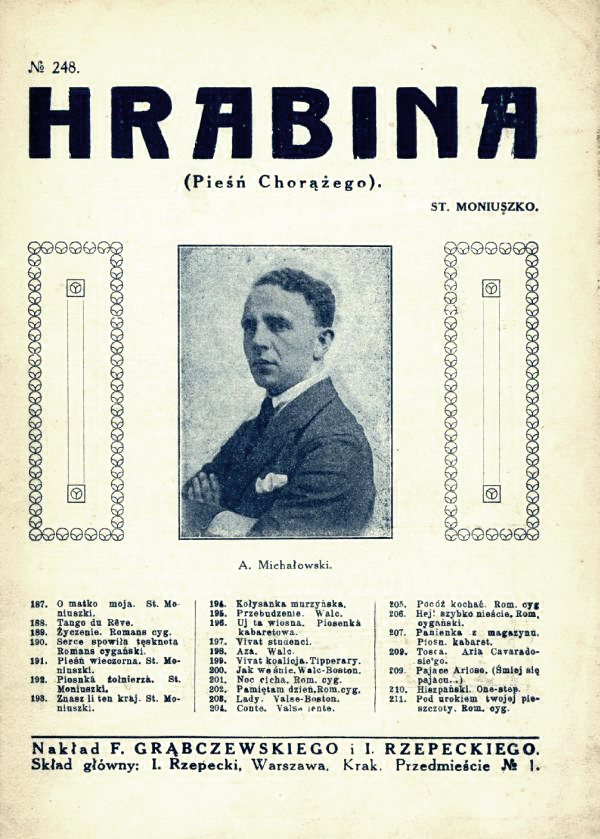
First print of an aria "The Song of an Ensign" with illustration of singer A. Michałowski (early 20th century)

The Countess (Hrabina) is an opera in three acts by the Polish composer Stanisław Moniuszko. The libretto was written by Włodzimierz Wolski (who also authored the libretto of Moniuszko's Halka). The opera was first performed at the Great Theatre, Warsaw, on 7 February 1860.

Although, the opera is acknowledged as Moniuszko's first fully mature musical composition, the libretto was criticized at first for its use of clichés. Yet the opera became extremely popular, thanks to the splendid music (Moniuszko shows great prowess in many sections, e.g. the polyphonic sextet at the end of Act I) as well as the national subject matter (this was only 3 years before the January Uprising), and, perhaps, also to the incorporation of some popular melodies (like Pojedziemy na łów! in Act III) .

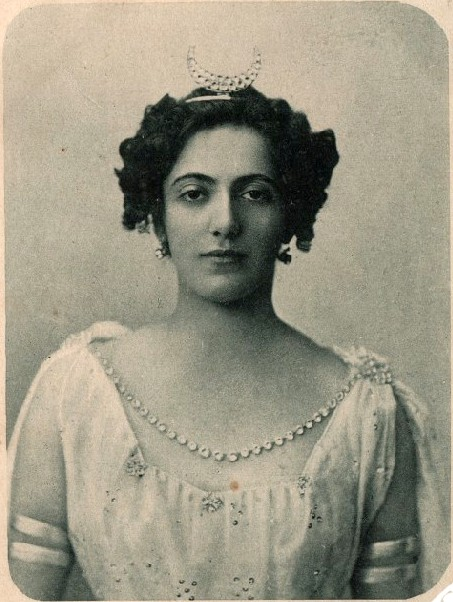
Solomiya Krushelnytska as Hrabina

== Roles ==
Role	Voice type	Premiere cast
Hrabina (the Countess)	soprano	Paulina Rivoli
Chorąży	bass	Wilhlem Troszel
Bronia, his granddaughter	mezzo-soprano	Józefa Chodowiecka-Hessowna
Ewa, the Countess' friend	soprano	Bronisława Dowiakowska-Klimowiczowa
Kazimierz	tenor	Mieczysław Kamiński
Podczaszyc (the Cupbearer)	baritone	Alojzy Żółkowski
Dzidzi, his nephew	tenor	Leopold Matuszyński

== Plot ==
Place: Warsaw, Poland, and a village in the Polish countryside Time: early 19th century

=== Act I ===
Warsaw. A great ball is to be held at the house of the recently widowed young Countess in a couple of days. Everyone here is busy with the preparations and talking about the greatness of the projected event. A breathtaking Diana's costume (dress) is being sewn for the Countess. Dzidzi is doing his best to win the Countess's favour. Also present in the household is Bronia, the Countess's distant relative who is being courted by the elderly Podczaszyc. Bronia has recently come to town from the country and she is feeling miserable in the new surroundings. She complains to her grandfather (the Chorąży) that she does not feel at home in the artificial world of the salon, a fake world full of unnatural foreign customs and empty laughter (O mój dziaduniu arietta). Bronia is unhappily in love with a neighbour from the countryside, the young nobleman Kazimierz who is also present in this house. He in turn loves the Countess. He is told by Chorąży to stop moping and go for a hunt (Ruszaj bracie, ruszaj w pole song). Kazimierz, however, feels that his happiness depends on the Countess's returning his love (Od twojej woli aria).

=== Act II ===
Before the ball the Countess puts on her new dress and admires herself in the mirror (Suknio coś mnie tak ubrała aria). The guests assembled in the ballroom are clearly divided into 2 groups: Kazimierz, Bronia and Chorąży form the "national side" – dressed in simple, traditional Polish attire. The other guests form the "foreign side" – luxuriously dressed yet alien to Polish tradition. We next witness a rehearsal of the show which is to aggrandize the ball: first a ballet scene (ballet music), then a virtuoso aria sung by the Countess's friend Ewa (Italian aria), then the Podczaszyc dressed up as Neptune arrives in a shell-shaped chariot, greeted by the other guests. The final number was to be sung by another of the Countess's friends, who fell ill. Bronia fills in for her and sings a sad song about a peasant girl longing for her soldier lover who went to war – she promises to be faithful to him to the grave (Szemrze strumyk pod jaworem song). The foreign-type guests are unmoved and find the song too trivial. Kazimierz, Chorąży, and even Podczaszyc are extremely impressed by the song's simple, sincere beauty. Madame de Vauban, the most prominent of the guests, arrives. In the ensuing disorder Kazimierz accidentally steps on the Countess's dress and tears it badly. Her polite attitude is immediately gone. It is clear that Kazimierz has lost all favour with her.

=== Act III ===
The Chorąży's country manor. A melancholy polonaise melody played by four cellos evokes the serene and patriotic atmosphere of this house. The Podczaszyc, who is a guest in this house, is out hunting (Pojedziemy na łów – Hunters' song). Bronia misses Kazimierz who after the unfortunate incident at the ball has set off to war. Unexpectedly, the Countess arrives – she has understood the value of Kazimierz's true feelings, and, having learned of his upcoming arrival and expecting that he will stop by Chorąży's house, she is eager to greet him and regain his love (On tu przybywa aria). Upon seeing Chorąży's country manor Kazimierz is reminded of Bronia's sweet face and sincerity (Rodzinna wioska już się uśmiecha aria). He greets the Countess rather coldly. Neither Bronia nor the Chorąży are aware of Kazimierz's change of heart, and they are anxious about his and the Countess's arrival at the same time. The Podczaszyc has however understood everything, including the inappropriate age difference between him and Bronia. A little drunk, he gives a long speech and proposes to Bronia on Kazimierz's behalf. Kazimierz kneels down before the Chorąży, confirming that the Podczaszyc has indeed correctly expressed his wish. The Countess is of course deeply disappointed. Vain and proud, she doesn't want to show her true feelings to everyone, and decides quickly to leave (Zbudzić się z ułudnych snów aria). Dzidzi is full of new hope. The remaining guests raise a toast to the new couple.

== Recordings ==
- Hrabina Europa Galante, Fabio Biondi 2CD 8th Oct 2021 Catalogue No: NIFCCD089-090 Label: Frederick Chopin Institute
- Orkiestra Teatru Wielkiego W Warszawie, M. Mierzejewski, CD of highlights from The Countess (PNCD 643, earlier released on LP) Polskie Nagrania
