= Executor =

Administrator in estate law

An executor is a person responsible for executing, or following through on, an assigned task or duty. The feminine form executrix is sometimes seen in historical documents. The term usually means an executor of a dead person's estate, which is someone whom a will and testament appoints to administer the dead person's estate and distribute their property as the will directs.

== Executor of will ==
Executor is a legal term referring to a person named by the maker of a will or nominated by the testator to carry out the instructions of the will. Typically, the executor is the person responsible for offering the will for probate, although it is not required that they fulfill this. The executor's duties also include distributing property to the beneficiaries as designated in the will, obtaining information of potential heirs, collecting and arranging for payment of debts of the estate and approving or disapproving creditors' claims.

An executor makes sure estate taxes are calculated, necessary forms are filed, and the corresponding payments are made. They also assist the attorney with the estate. Additionally, the executor acts as a legal conveyor who designates where the donations will be sent using the information left in bequests, whether they be sent to charity or other organizations. In most circumstances, the executor is the representative of the estate for all purposes, and has the ability to sue or be sued on behalf of the estate. The executor holds legal title to the estate property, but must not use the title or property for their own benefit, unless permitted by the terms of the will.

A person who deals with a deceased person's property without proper authority is known as an executor de son tort. Such a person's actions can subsequently be ratified by the lawful executors or administrators if the actions do not contradict the substantive provisions of the deceased's will or the rights of heirs at law.

If there is no will, a person is said to have died intestate—"without testimony". As a result, there is no tangible "testimony" to follow, and hence there can be no executor. If there is no will or the executors named in a will do not wish to act, an administrator of the deceased's estate can instead be appointed. The generic term for executors or administrators is personal representative. In England and Wales, when a person dies intestate in a nursing home, and has no family members who can be traced, those responsible for their care automatically become their executors.

In Scots law, a personal representative of any kind is referred to as an executor, using executor nominate to refer to an executor in the English sense and executor dative to an administrator in the English sense.

Any person designated as an executor can choose not to administer the estate. In the UK, upon making that choice the designated person can execute a "power reserved" letter, which allows the person to later act as executor if the person named on the grant of probate is removed or is no longer able to act.

=== Executor pay ===
In some countries, such as the United States, an executor is automatically entitled to compensation for their services, although this amount varies dramatically by jurisdiction. Unless specifically set by the will, this compensation is often determined by what is considered "reasonable" for the effort involved, although in a number of jurisdictions, the amount is instead set as a percentage of the overall estate. For example, in California the executor is entitled to 4% of the first $100K of estate value, 3% of the next $100K, and so on. In other countries, such as the United Kingdom, the executor is not automatically entitled to compensation, although compensation can be directed within the will or on application to a court.

== See also ==
- Administration of Estates Act 1925 – Act of the Parliament of the United Kingdom that consolidated, reformed, and simplified the rules relating to the administration of estates in England and Wales.
- Digital estate – Passing down of digital assets after a person's death
- Estate – Value of a person's assets minus their liabilities
- Executorial trustee – Someone appointed to be an executor
- Inheritance – Practice of passing on property upon the death of individuals
- Literary executor – Deceased author's copyright and intellectual property
- Probate sale – Legal sale of real estate for division
