= Nijolė =

- Gender: Female
- Name day: 28 January

Origin
- Region of origin: invented

Nijolė is a Lithuanian feminine given name. It is one of the numerous pseudomythological names invented in the 19th century by Lithuanian writer Teodor Narbutt for Lithuanian pagan mythology (in his book the name was given in Polish language style "Nijola"). See List of Lithuanian gods and mythological figures for more.

Notable people with the name Nijolė include:

- Nijolė Ambrazaitytė (1939–2016), Lithuanian opera singer and politician
- Nijolė Būraitė (born 1956), Lithuanian painter and painting restorer
- Nijolė Medvedeva (born 1960), Lithuanian long jumper
- Nijolė Oželytė-Vaitiekūnienė (born 1954), Lithuanian actress
- Nijolė Sabaitė (born 1950), Lithuanian middle-distance runner
- Nijolė Sadūnaitė (born 1938), Lithuanian Catholic nun and Soviet dissident
