= Janina Korolewicz-Waydowa =

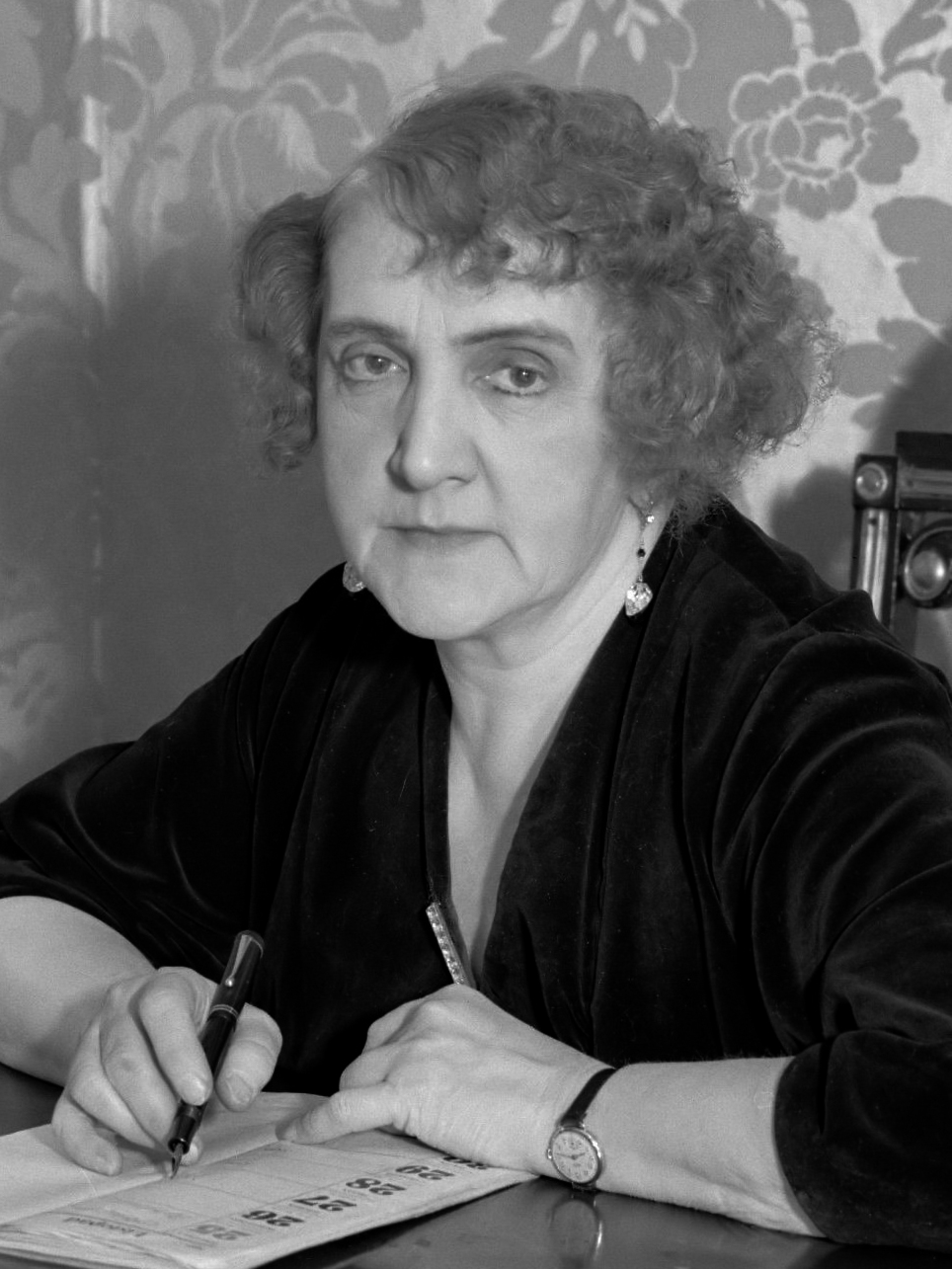
Korolewicz-Waydowa in 1934

Janina Korolewicz-Waydowa (1875–1955) was a Polish soprano and opera director, the world's first female opera house director.

== Life ==
Janina Korolewicz-Waydowa was born in Warsaw on 3 January 1875 or 22 December 1876, the daughter of Piotr Korolewicz, an official, and Ewa née Teraszkiewicz. She trained under Walery Wysocki at the Conservatory of the Galician Music Society in Lwów/Lemberg.

Aged 17, Korolewicz-Waydowa made her debut as Hanna in The Haunted Manor. She sang with the Warsaw Opera from 1898 to 1902, before joining the Berlin Opera. For a season, she performed at the Teatro Nacional de São Carlos in Lisbon, and then the Royal Opera in Madrid. She continued performing internationally – in Venice, Bucharest, Odesa, Kyiv, St. Petersburg, Kharkiv, London, New York, and Chicago – until 1913, when she returned to Warsaw. She managed the Warsaw Opera from 1917 to 1919 and 1934 to 1936.
