= Paria (opera) =

1869 opera by Stanisław Moniuszko

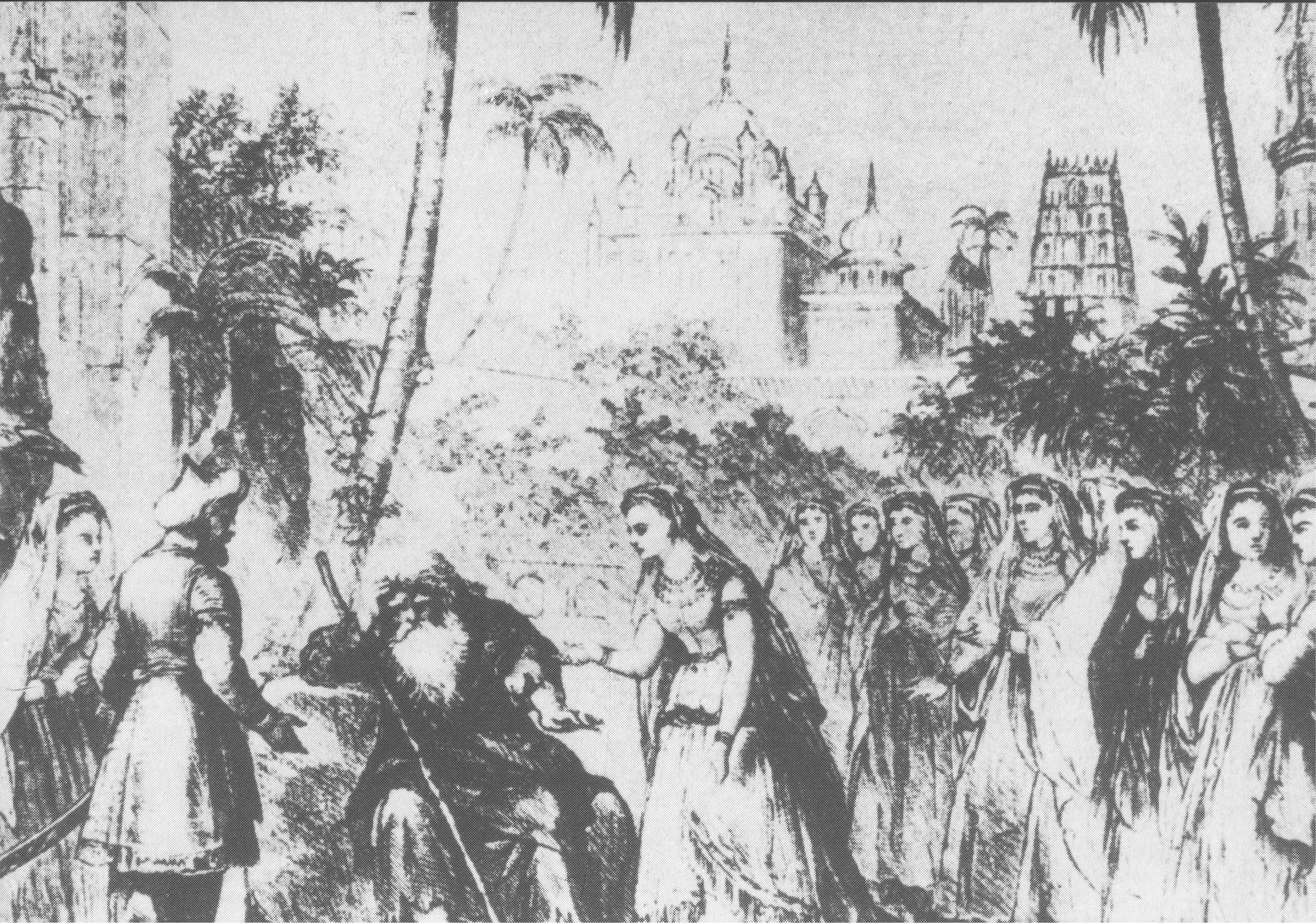
Scene from Act II. Etching by Julian Schübeler

Paria (The pariah) is an 1869 opera in three acts by Stanisław Moniuszko to a libretto by Jan Chęciński - the librettist of Straszny dwór - after the play Le paria (1821) by Casimir Delavigne.

== Cast ==
- Idamor, head of the warrior caste - tenor
- Ratef, his trustee - tenor
- Akebar, high priest - bass
- Neala, his daughter - soprano
- Mirra, priestess - mezzo-soprano
- Dżares, the pariah, Idamor's father - baritone
- Brahmins, priestesses, warriors, people

== Recordings ==
- Paria with Katarzyna Hołysz – Neala, Leszek Skrla – Dżares, Janusz Lewandowski – Akebar, Tomasz Kuk – Idamor, Andrzej Lampert – Ratef. Chór i Orkiestra Opery na Zamku w Szczecinie, cond. Warcisław Kunc 2CD, 2008, Dux 0686/7.
- Paria (in Italian version), Katarzyna Hołysz (Neala), Robert Jezierski (Akebar), Yuri Gorodetski (Idamor), Szymon Komasa (Djares), Tomasz Warmijak (Ratef) Poznan Philharmonic Orchestra, Łukasz Borowicz 2CD 2019 Dux
- Paria (in Italian version), Marta Torbidoni, David Astorga, German Olvera, Aleksey Bogdanov, Matheus Pompeu, Paulina Boreczko, Europa Galante, Fabio Biondi Label: NIFC, DDD, 2023
