= Probate sale =

Legal sale of real estate for division

A probate sale is the process executed at a county court where the executor for the estate of a deceased person sells property from the estate (typically real estate) in order to divide the property among the beneficiaries. There is a personal representative of the estate who will determine if the real estate is going to be sold. A personal representative is not required to use the services of a real estate broker.

Determination of the value of real estate and other functions may need to be performed by a probate referee.
