= Flis (opera) =

Opera by Stanisław Moniuszko

Flis (Raftsman) is a Polish-language opera in one act by Stanisław Moniuszko to a libretto by Stanisław Bogusławski. It was premiered in Warsaw on 24 September 1858.

== Cast ==
- Antoni, a wealthy landowner – bass
- Zosia, his daughter – soprano
- Franek, young rafter – tenor
- Jakub, hairdresser – baritone
- Sixth, former soldier – bass
- Feliks, rafter – tenor
- Rafters, villagers, villagers, children.

== Performances ==
The opera was given in a concert performance and recorded in the Wielki Theatre of Polish National Opera at the 2019 Chopin and his Europe International Music Festival, marking the 200th anniversary of Moniuszko's birth.

== Recordings ==
- Flis – Bernard Ładysz (bass), Andrzej Hiolski (baritone), Zdzisław Nikodem (tenor), Bogdan Paprocki (tenor), Halina Słonicka (soprano), Antoni Majak (bass) Chór Filharmonii Narodowej, Orkiestra Filharmonii Narodowej, Zdzisław Górzyński 1962 Anaklasis 58 minutes
- Flis – Ewa Tracz (Zosia), Matheus Pompeu (Franek), Mariusz Godlewski (Jakub), Aleksander Teliga (Antoni), Wojtek Gierlach (Szóstak), Paweł Cichoński (Feliks), Podlaska Opera and Orchestra, Europa Galante, Fabio Biondi 3 April 2020 NIFCCD086
