= Donald Pippin (opera director) =

American pianist (1925–2021)

Donald Pippin (Zebulon, North Carolina, December 8, 1925—San Francisco, California, July 7, 2021) was an American pianist, and founder of Pocket Opera.

Born in Zebulon, North Carolina and educated at Harvard University, Pippin began his career as an accompanist at George Balanchine's School of American Ballet in New York City. In 1952, Pippin moved to San Francisco, and has been an integral part of that city's artistic life since then. Audiences have followed him from his start at the hungry i and Opus One in North Beach, through nearly two decades of presenting a weekly chamber music series (1960–1978) at the Old Spaghetti Factory Cafe, to his present-day fame as the creator of one of San Francisco's most popular operatic institutions.

Pippin's first translation came in 1968, in the course of preparing Mozart's one-act opera Bastien und Bastienne for performance as part of his chamber music series. The opera, and his singing translation of it, were immediate successes with San Francisco audiences.

From that point on, Pippin dedicated himself to the task of producing literate English versions of both well-loved classics and lesser-known gems of operatic literature. His repertoire grew to include 90 translations, many of which have been used by the Washington Opera at the Kennedy Center for the Performing Arts, the San Francisco Opera Center, the San Diego Opera, the Juilliard School of Music, and the Aspen Music Festival, among many others.

The Pocket Opera Press has published 4 volumes of Pippin's "Opera in English" libretto collections: vol. 1, ISBN 0979776236; vol. 2, ISBN 0979776228; vol. 3, ISBN 0979776244; vol. 4, ISBN 0979776252.

Pippin died peacefully on Wednesday, July 7, 2021, in his home in San Francisco, California. He was 95.

== See also ==
- Pocket Opera
