= Pocket Opera =

American chamber opera group

Pocket Opera is a professional chamber opera company based in San Francisco, California that presents staged chamber productions of operas sung in English. The company, founded in 1978, offers performances of both famous and lesser-known selections of operatic literature, accompanied by its chamber orchestra the Pocket Philharmonic. Since its inception, Pocket Opera has developed a repertoire that now includes over 90 operas. Pocket Opera's season typically runs from March through July and includes four to five productions. Its current artistic director is Nicolas A. Garcia.

== History ==
The company's founder and Artistic Director Emeritus, Donald Pippin began creating English performance translations of opera libretti in the 1960s, which led to the founding of Pocket Opera. These accessible, highly singable, and often witty settings now include over 70 operas, and form the backbone of Pocket Opera's productions. They have also been used by other companies, including Washington National Opera, San Francisco Opera Center, San Diego Opera, Juilliard School of Music, Aspen Music Festival, and companies in Canada, The UK, and Australia. Performance scores of Pippin's translations are archived at Stanford University, and are available for rent through Pocket Opera.

== Venues ==
Pocket Opera's San Francisco venue is the historic Gunn Theater at the Legion of Honor museum. The company also regularly performs at the Hillside Club in Berkeley, California, and at various venues on the Peninsula and the North Bay.
