= Marian Sawa =

Polish composer, organist, improviser, musicologist and pedagogue

Marian Sawa (January 12, 1937 in Krasnystaw – April 27, 2005 in Warsaw) was a Polish composer, organist, improviser, musicologist, and pedagogue.

== Biography ==
Sawa graduated from the Chopin University of Music in Warsaw, Poland in Feliks Rączkowski's organ class and Kazimierz Sikorski's composition class.

As a pedagogue he worked in Warsaw music education at the higher and academic level: J.Elsner Music School, K.Szymanowski Music School, F. Chopin Music Academy and Kardynal Stefan Wyszynski University (theoretical and practical musicology).

He toured as a soloist and an accompanist around the country and abroad.

He recorded many LPs and CDs for such companies as Polskie Nagrania, Veriton, Polonia Records, Arston, DUX, and Acte Preable.

He was awarded many composition prizes, including First Prize at the Young Composers Competition ZKP(for Assemblage for orchestra), as well as civil prizes and distinctions (the prizes of the Ministry of Culture and Art, and the Ministry of National Education).

== Compositions ==
Sawa composed around 1,000 pieces, including instrumental, vocal and vocal-instrumental works.

He was a well-known and prolific organ composer (i.e. five organ concerts, sonatas, fantasies, preludies, toccatas, passacaglias).

Many of his works evolved from a religious inspiration, including numerous pieces for a mixed choir and a men's choir a cappella, but also great cantata-oratorio forms (Via Crucis, Missa Claramontana, a few forms of Magnificat and Stabat Mater). In his music he often recalled Gregorian chant, Polish church songs and Polish folklore, sometimes combining them in one piece.

Sawa's works have been recorded on over 40 CDs by, for example, Acte Preable and Musica Sacra Edition. His organ compositions have been performed by Andrzej Chorosiński, organist Joachim Grubich, Marietta Kruzel Sosnowska, Józef Serafin, Jan Szypowski, and Irena Wisełka-Cieślar.

In 2006, on the first anniversary of Sawa's death, a Marian Sawa's Society was created, whose main goal is the promotion of the artist's works, publishing his works, and organizing concerts and festivals dedicated to his creative activity.

After Sawa's death the owners of his works are Aleksandra and Radosław Sawa, who cooperate with the Marian Sawa's Society.
