= Felix Labunski =

French composer

- Born: 27 December 1892; Ksawerynów, Poland
- Died: 28 April 1979 (aged 86); Cincinnati, Ohio, United States
- Education: Warsaw Conservatory; Ecole Normale
- Occupation: Composer

Felix Labunski (27 December 1892 – 28 April 1979) was a Polish-born French-American composer.

Labunski attended Warsaw Conservatory where he studied with Witold Maliszewski. He then became a pupil of Nadia Boulanger and Paul Dukas at the Ecole Normale in Paris. His work was part of the music event in the art competition at the 1932 Summer Olympics.

He emigrated to the United States in 1936 and became an American citizen in 1941. He taught at Marymount Manhattan College from 1940 until 1941, at the Cincinnati College Conservatory between 1945 and 1955 and at the University of Cincinnati from 1955 until 1964 when he retired.

== Discography ==
- Complete Piano Works AP0566 Acte Préalable 2023: Sławomir Dobrzański piano, David Pickering organ

== See also ==
- Wiktor Łabuński, his younger brother
