= Old City Hall (Legnica) =

Building in Legnica, Silesia, Poland

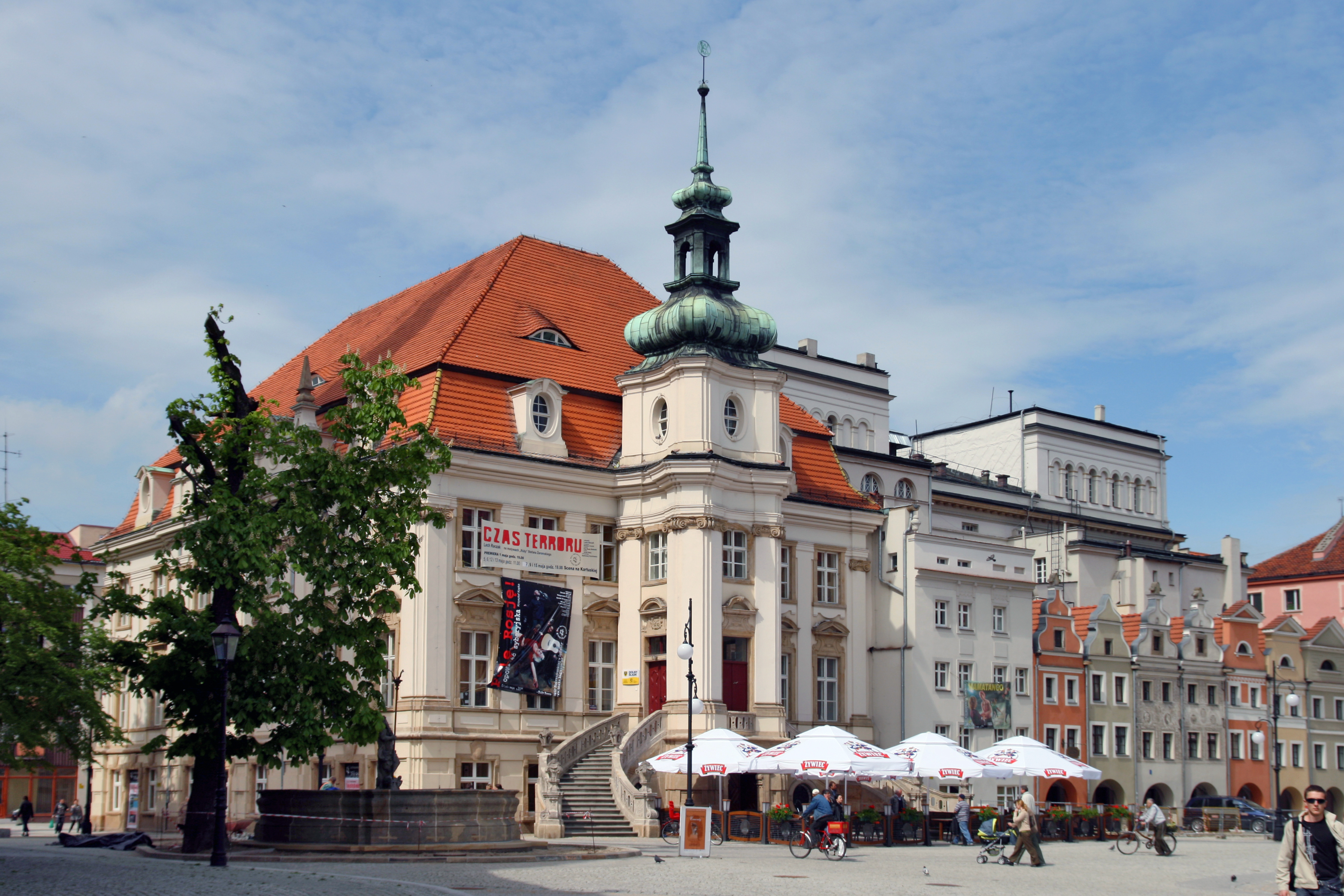
Old City Hall in Legnica

The Old City Hall in Legnica, Siledia, Poland, was built between 1737 and 1741 in Baroque style. Initially, it was the seat of the municipal authorities, in 1928 it was adapted as the seat of a theater. It currently houses the administration of the theater and the actors' dressing rooms.

== History ==
The first wooden city hall in Legnica was established as early as the 14th century on the basis of a privilege granted by Duke Boleslaw III the Wasteful. Similarly to the subsequent brick building, the wooden structure was subject to fire damage. The present building was erected between 1737 and 1741 under the direction of Franz Michael Sheerhofer, as a fragment of the market square complex. The first meeting of the city council took place on May 15, 1741, and the last - 164 years later - on April 8, 1905. The building was reconstructed in 1836, and then rebuilt again between 1926 and 1928, as a theater. It was renovated in 1960-1960, and most recently in 1977–1978.

On March 29, 1949, by decision of the provincial conservator, the building was entered in the register of historical monuments.

== Architecture ==
The Baroque building has three tracts, a large hallway and three storeys. There is a risalit on the axis of the building, emphasized by two separate rows of external stairs. The rusticated first floor supports the pilasters dividing the elevation. The building is covered with a mansard roof with dormers, and the risalit with an onion helmet. The Old City Hall is now integrally connected to the adjacent theater on the north side. It is occupied by the administration of the Helena Modrzejewska Theatre in Legnica and the actors' dressing rooms.

== Gallery ==
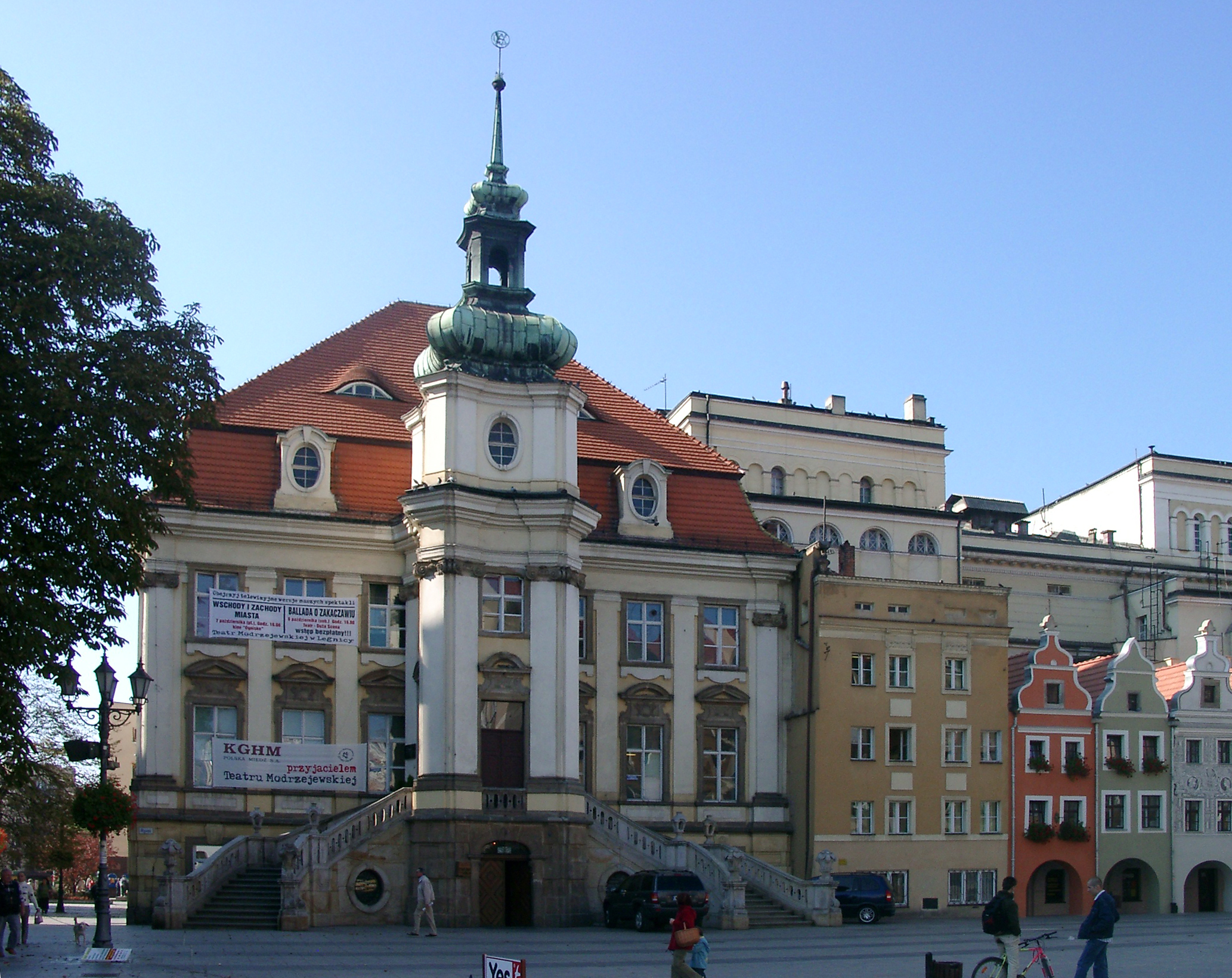

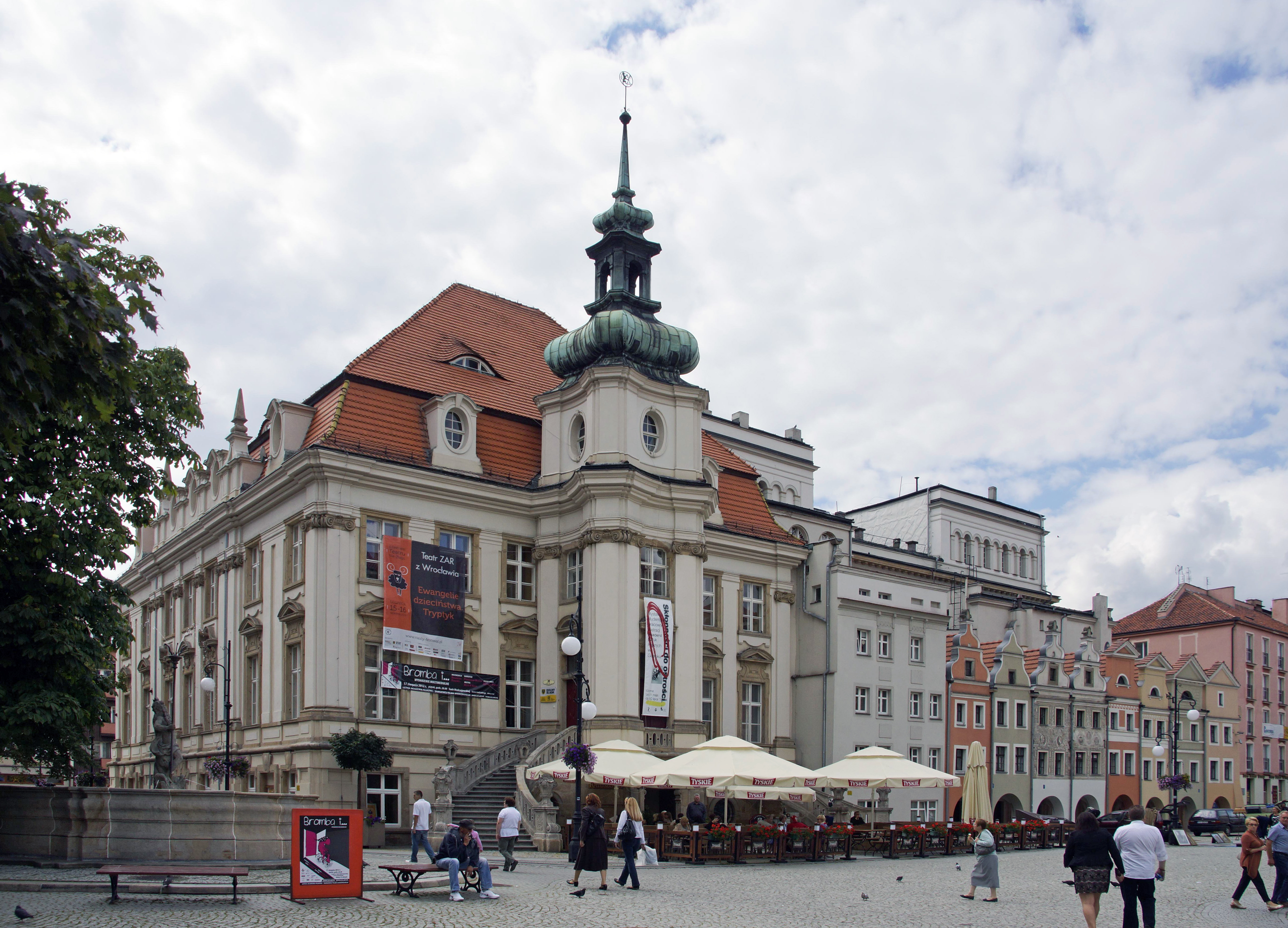

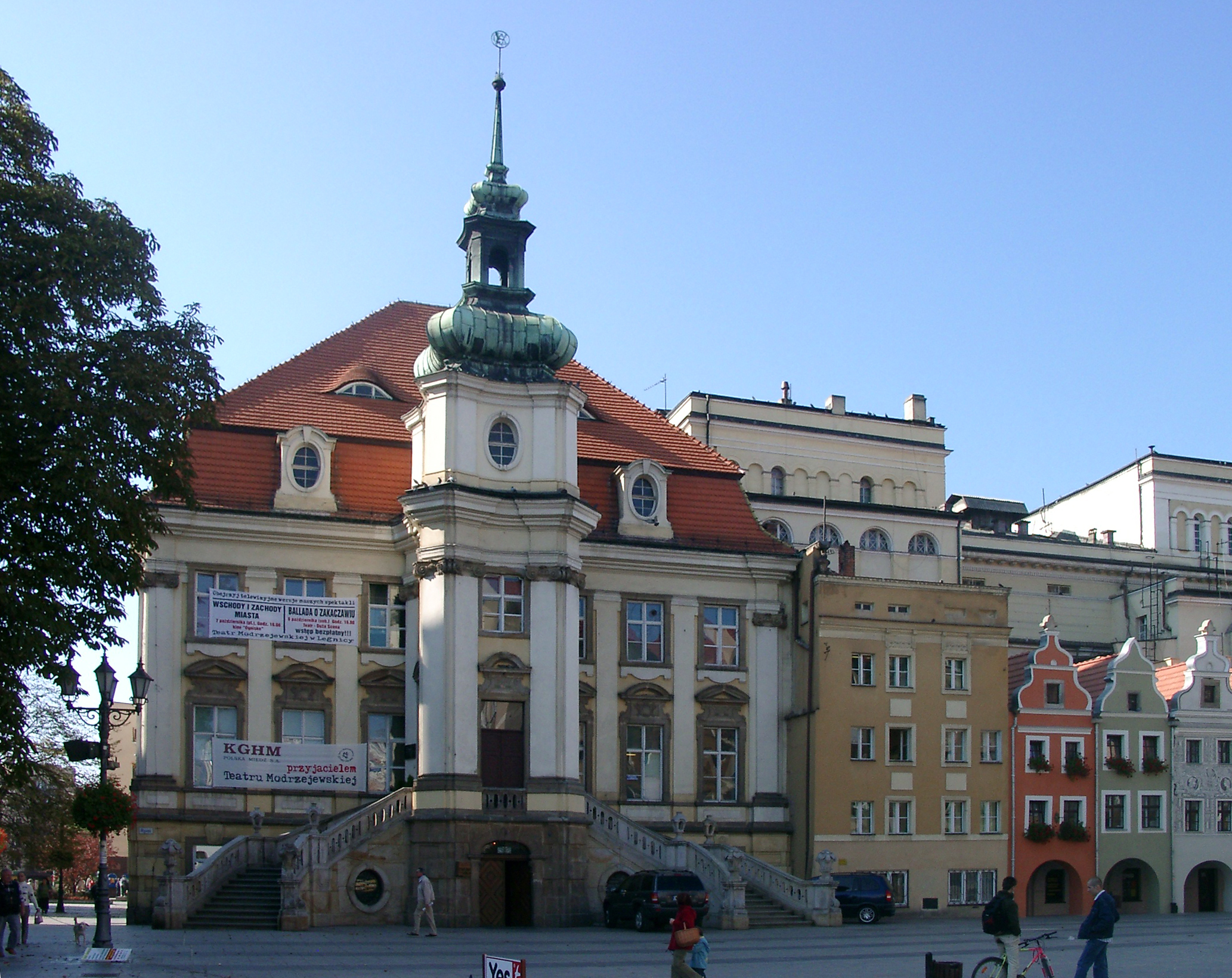

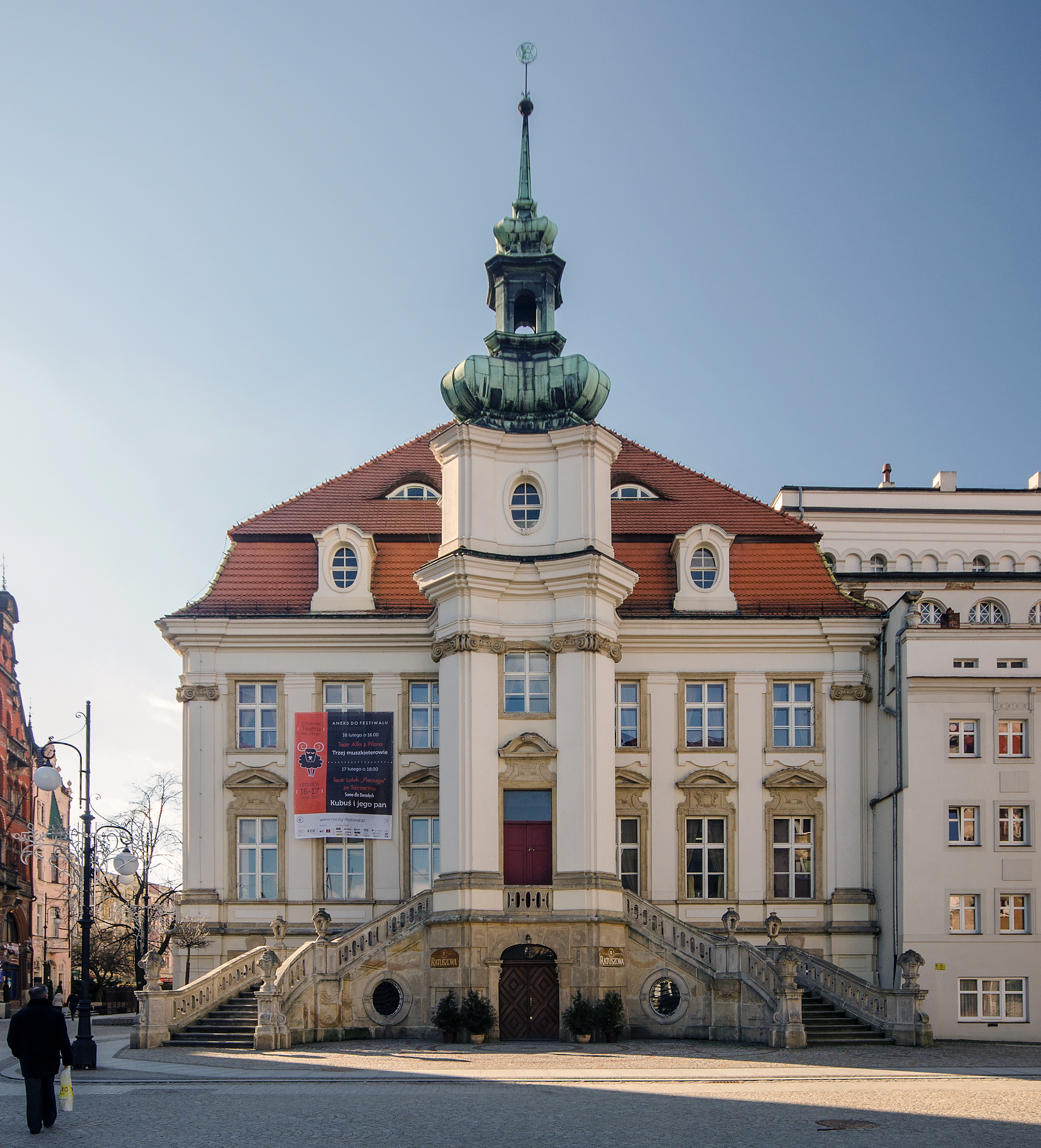

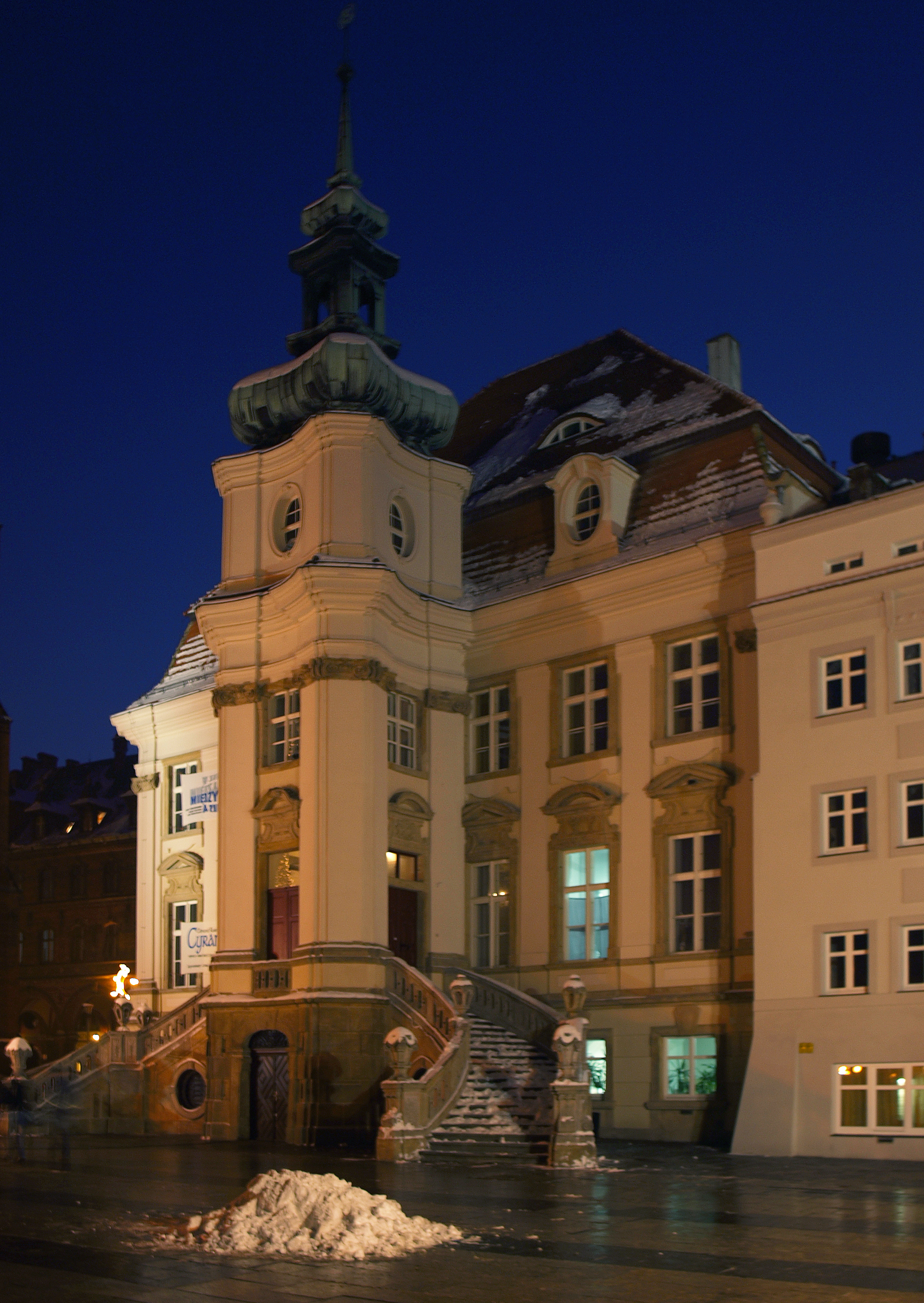

== Literature ==
- Pilch J., Leksykon zabytków architektury Dolnego Śląska, Warszawa: Wydawnictwo Arkady, 2005, ISBN 83-213-4366-X, OCLC 69480077.
- Roman Pawlak, "Zabytkowe ratusze", Warszawa, MUZA SA, 2003, ISBN 83-7200-991-0.
