= Justyna Zańko =

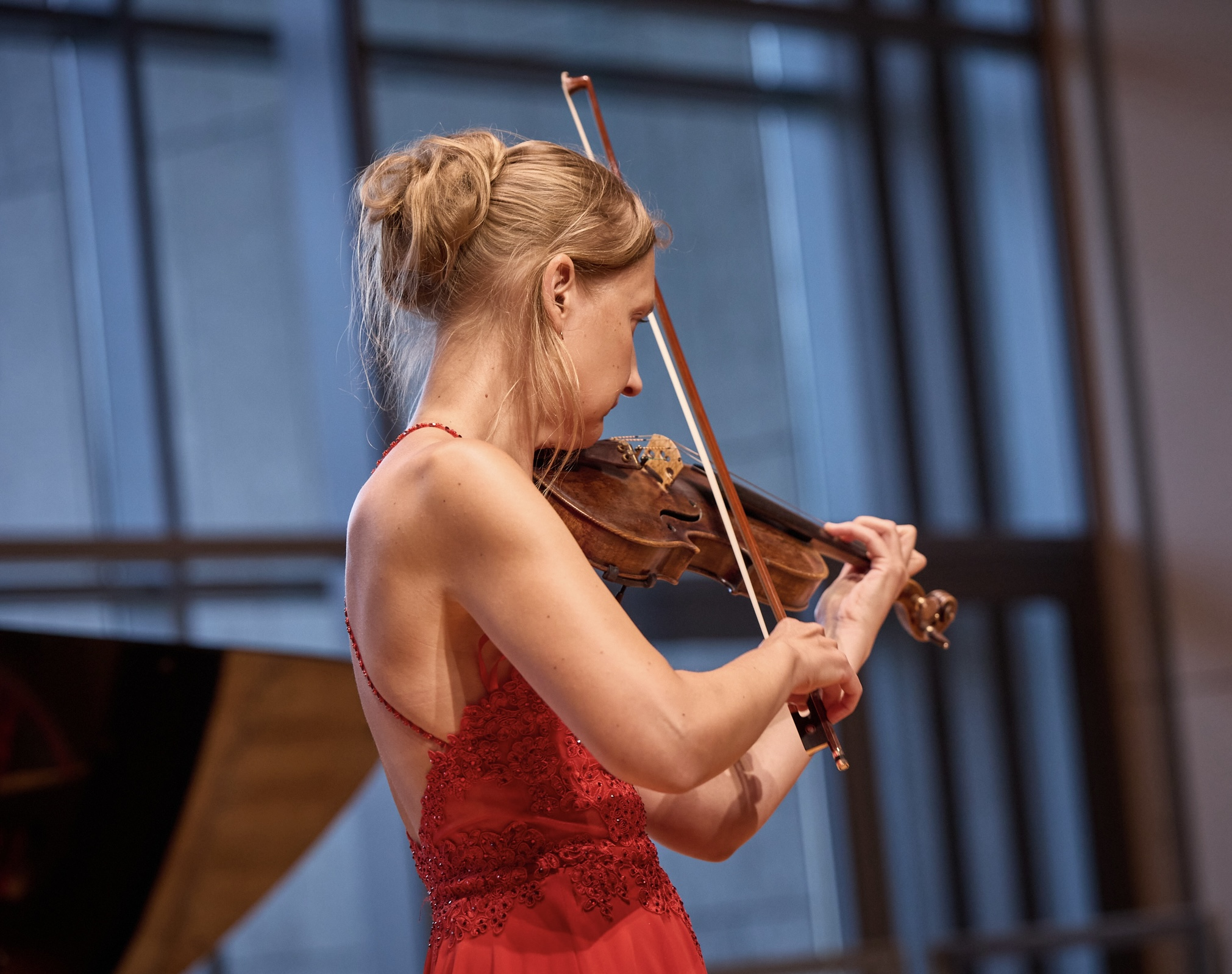
- Concert at Mozarteum concert hall (2021)

Background information
- Born: 26 September
- Genres: Classical
- Occupation: Violinist
- Instrument: Violin
- Years active: 2000–present
- Website: justyna-zanko.com

Justyna Ewa Zańko (born 26 September) is a Polish violinist who performs as a soloist and chamber musician. She has appeared at prestigious venues such as Carnegie Hall in New York, the Royal Albert Hall in London, the Beethoven House in Bonn, Mozarteum concert hall in Salzburg, and the Crown Tribunal in Lublin.

== Early life and education ==
Zańko is originally from Lublin, Poland. She began playing the violin at the age of seven under Bohdan Giergiel, the long-time concertmaster of the Lublin Philharmonic, followed by studies with Franciszek Falger. She graduated with distinction from the Fryderyk Chopin Music High School in Kraków, where she studied under Antoni Cofalik. She later earned a master's degree in music at the Fryderyk Chopin University of Music in Warsaw, where her teachers included Tadeusz Gadzina and Roman Lasocki.

In 2014, she completed postgraduate studies at the Royal Birmingham Conservatoire in the UK, receiving an Advanced Postgraduate Diploma in Professional Performance. Her mentor was Dr. Rimma Sushanskaya, a Russian violinist and the last student of David Oistrakh.

== Artistic career ==
=== Competitions and awards ===
Zańko has won numerous national and international violin competitions. She was awarded First Prize and a Special Award at the Bach International Music Competition in 2023, and received multiple Grand Prize Virtuoso distinctions in Salzburg (2021), Bonn (2020 and 2021), and London (2021 and 2022). She also won the Golden Classical Music Awards (2022), with a final performance at Carnegie Hall.

She was previously a finalist in the National Stanisław Serwaczyński Violin Competition and the Henryk Wieniawski International Violin Competition in Lublin, and a winner of the “Young Talents” competition in Kraków.

In 2021, she received an artistic scholarship from the Marshal of the Lublin Voivodeship.

=== Concert performances ===
Zańko has performed widely in Poland and abroad, including at Carnegie Hall, Royal Albert Hall (Elgar Room), Beethoven-Haus, Mozarteum, Malta Society of Arts in Valletta, Adrian Boult Hall, Recital Hall in Birmingham, the Gallery of Polish Painting at Lublin Castle, and the Crown Tribunal in Lublin.

She has collaborated with orchestras such as the Lublin Philharmonic Symphony Orchestra (2001, 2018), the Crown Tribunal Orchestra (2012), the Royal Birmingham Conservatoire Symphony Orchestra (2013), and the Stratford Virtuosi Orchestra (2014).

In December 2021, she performed at the Polish Outstanding Person of the Year award ceremony in Paris, held at the Polish Embassy in France.

In 2024, she performed at TEDxLublin in a violin-piano duet with Julia Miller at the Old Theatre in Lublin. She also appeared in the "Echoes of Poland" concert in Malta and at the Victoria International Arts Festival in Gozo.

She has performed with artists including Piotr Wijatkowski, Michael Seal, Rimma Sushanskaya, and Cheung Chau.

== Organizational work ==
In 2020, Zańko became president of the Virtuoso Music Foundation, which organizes concerts, festivals, and educational events to promote classical music. She serves as the artistic director and jury member of the international VirtuClassic festival and competition.

She also founded the “Classics in the Crown” concert series, hosted at the Crown Tribunal in Lublin, which features both established musicians and emerging artists.

== Discography ==
- Justyna Zańko – Solo Violin (2021) – A solo album featuring works by Bach, Eugène Ysaÿe, and Heinrich Ignaz Biber.
