= Konstanty Gorski =

Polish musician

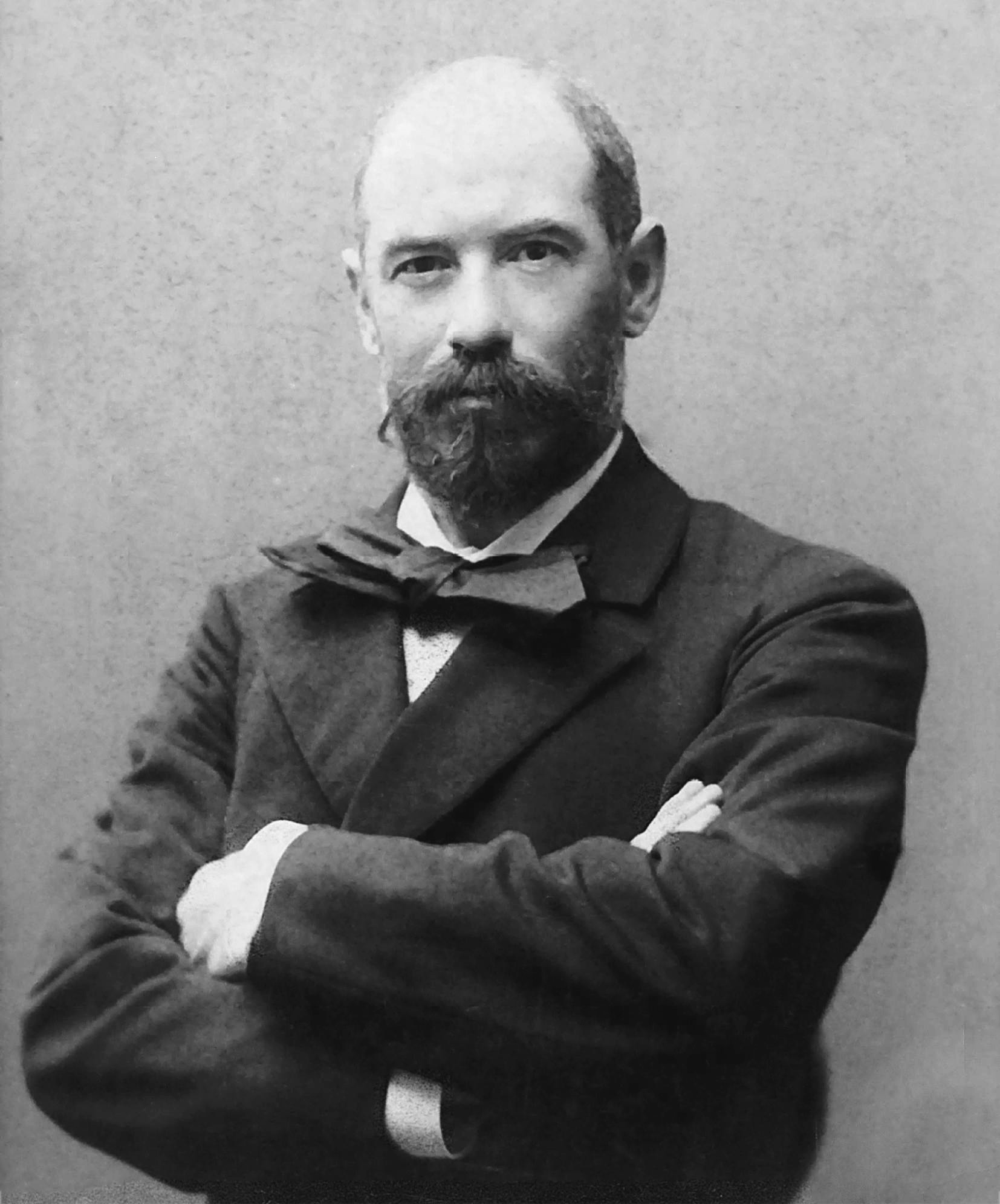
Photograph by Alfred Fedecki

Konstanty Antoni Gorski (Polish pronunciation: [kɔnˈstantɨ anˈtɔɲi ˈgɔrskʲi]) (Lida, 13 June 1859 – 31 May 1924, Poznań) was a Polish composer, violinist, organist and music teacher.

== Life ==
Gorski began attending school in Grodno and continued at the First Philological Gymnasium in Wilno. He obtained his musical education at the Musical Institute in Warsaw (then under the direction of Apolinary Kątski) and at the St. Petersburg Conservatory. In 1881 he graduated from the great Hungarian violinist and pedagogue Leopold Auer class and received large silver medal and “free artist” status. Next year he spent studying composition and instrumentation in class of famous Russian composer Nikolai Rimsky-Korsakov.

In year 1890 after eight-years-trip over Russia and Georgia – through Penza, Saratov and Tiflis (Tbilisi nowadays) Konstanty Gorski arrived to Ukrainian city of Kharkov to stay there for 29 years. He spent those years teaching youth in Kharkov Musical Secondary School, performing public work (he was one of the “Polish House” culture organization founders), working as conductor of symphonic orchestra and Polish and Church Chorus that was created due to his efforts, and staying beloved by publicity violinist and highly valued by other composers performer of their musical compositions (and Pyotr Ilyich Tchaikovsky treated him with deep respect saying that Gorski was the greatest one to execute his violin concert D-dur).

Political and economical changes in Russian Imperia, mainly October Revolution in 1917, had a great influence on the Gorski's fortune. Foreseeing approaching civil war and having no possibility of continuing his work in Kharkov, Gorski took his family and returned to Poland that had achieved freedom. At first he settled in Warsaw, where he then worked as taper in cinemas “Colosseum” and “Wodewil,” and after Warsaw he went to Poznań and achieved position of the Great Theatre concertmaster, and held it till the end of life. His opera “Margier” was shown in Poznań Opera in 1927. Other compositions of Gorski also were executed during the interwar period, e.g. a Missa Solemnis in E-flat major (inter alia by Poznań Moniuszko Chorus), symphonic poem Vicious Circle (Zaczarowane koło) and Organ Fantasy f-moll (first time it was executed in 1920 by Antoni Karnaszewki in Warsaw Philharmonic and after three years – by Feliks Nowowiejski in time of Copernicus cultural event in Poznań University). That fantasy is executed till nowadays with a great success.

== Works ==
His best-known compositions include:

- Organ fantaisie F minor - part Video on YouTube; part Video on YouTube
- Missa Solemnis E-flat major and Missa A minor
- Opera, Margier
- Opera, Za chlebem
- Songs: Ave Maria, Salve Regina on YouTube, Salutation a la Sainte Vierge on YouTube, Зряще мя безгласна (Zriaszcze mia bezglasna) and 12 pieśni do słów M.Konopnickiej, Wł. Syrokomli, Zd. Dębickiego i in. na m-sopran lub tenor z towarzyszeniem fortepianu
- Symphonic Poems: Na Olimpie and Zaczarowane koło
- Souvenir de Nadrzecze. Premiere Mazurka, Petite Etude - Spiccato, Seconde Mazourka, sur des chants polonais, Aria, Gavotte, Romance, 3-leme Mazourka, 1-ere Polonaise de Concert D-dur, 2-de Polonaise de Concert A-dur, Poeme Lyrique

== See also ==
- List of Polish composers
- List of Poles
