= Old Theatre in Lublin =

Coordinates: 51.2474°N 22.5692°E

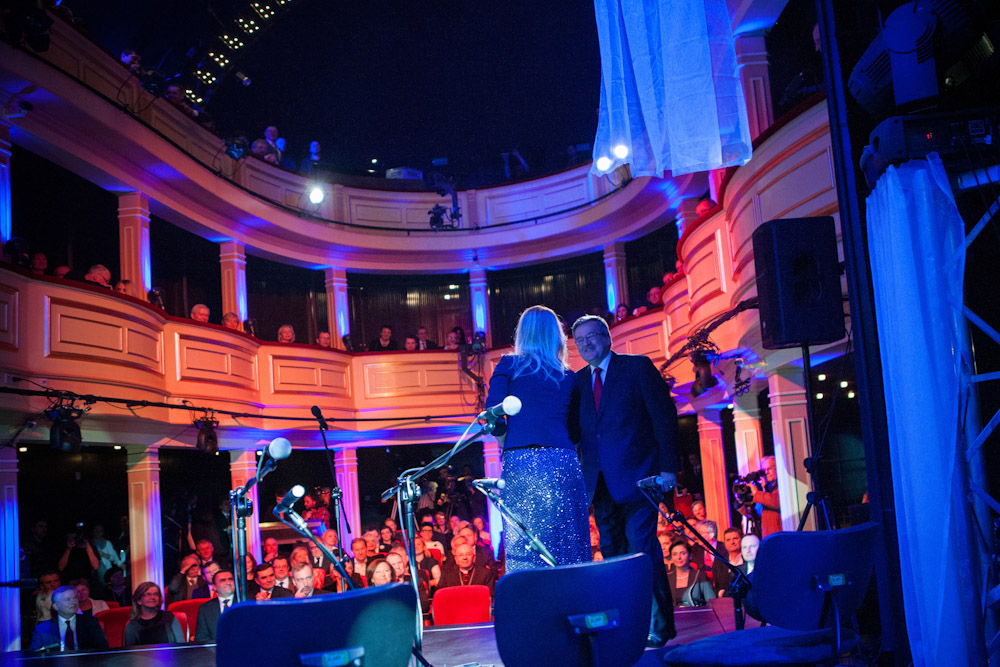
President Bronisław Komorowski at the opening of the Old Theatre in 2012

The Old Theatre in Lublin - an impresario theater in Lublin opened in 1822. Initially it housed the Lublin Drama and Opera Stages, and in the 20th century also a cinema.

== General information ==
The Old Theatre in Lublin is the oldest surviving theater in Poland, after the Helena Modrzejewska Theatre in Kraków. The 19th-century building is located within the boundaries of Lublin's Old Town and was built in the Classical style with blind arcades and rectangular panels as well as stucco decorations on Jezuicka Street; the façade features bas-reliefs of masks and griffins.

Originally, the building was divided into four floors: first floor, first floor chairs, balcony and gallery. The stage was lit using oil lighting, later kerosene lighting. As a result of the 2007–2012 reconstruction, the building gained two additional underground floors housing warehouses and sanitary facilities (originally, the theater had no basement). The original arrangement of foyer - auditorium - stage - curtain has been preserved in the theater. After reconstruction, the theater has 165 seats.

In its current form, the Old Theatre is a place of various cultural events. Both theater performances and concerts are organized, as well as meetings, debates and educational activities for children. The institution has an interdisciplinary, confronting, dynamic and educational character.

== History ==
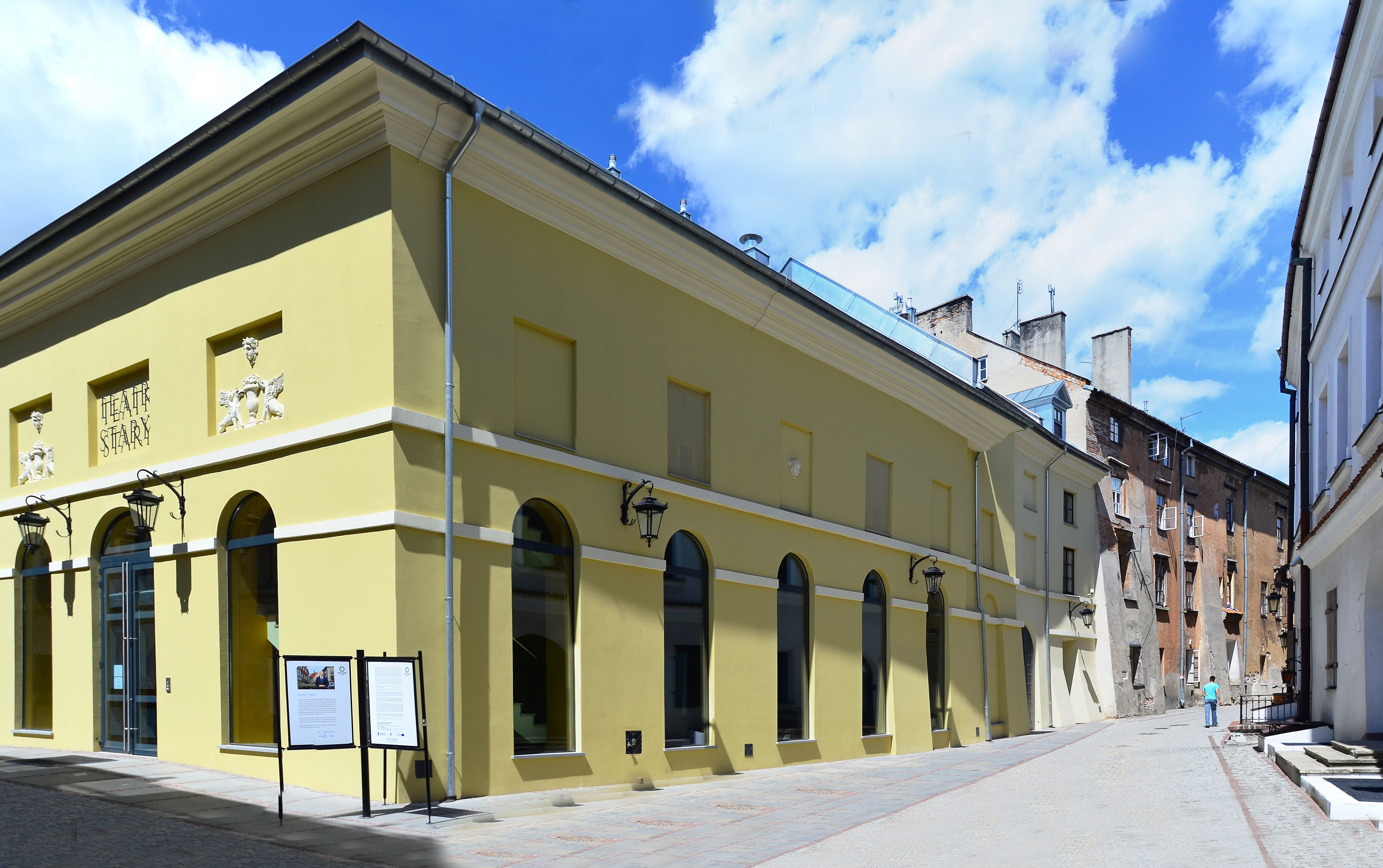
View from Jezuicka Street

The Old Theatre in Lublin was erected on 5 July 1822 on the site of ruined sixteenth-century tenement houses, at the back of a building designed by Łukasz Rodakiewicz. The first performance took place on 20 October 1822. Although the building was cramped, uncomfortable, and primitively furnished, it served the city as a winter theater until 1886. Beginning in the late nineteenth century, after the construction of the new and much larger Juliusz Osterwa Theater, the Old Theatre was used mainly by traveling theater troupes and circus artists.

In 1907, a cinema named Théâtre Optique Parisien was opened there, and the building functioned as a movie theater. In the interwar years, Jewish theater troupes often visited the institution. In later years, the cinema was called Rialto, and later Staromiejskie (Old Town Cinema), the last film screening took place in 1981. Later on, the building suffered several fires (among others in 1993) and became increasingly neglected. In 1994, the „Galeria na Prowincji” Foundation bought the theater for 100 zloty, promising to renovate it within two years. It did not keep its word, and the building was falling into ruin.

As a result of progressive deterioration, the building was included in the list of 100 Most Endangered Objects of the World Heritage Watch, a program of the World Monuments Fund (WMF). The theater underwent renovation works in 2007 which cost over 26 million zlotys, 20 million zlotys of which the city of Lublin received from the EU program Infrastructure and Environment. In December 2010 a call for proposals for the future director of the theatre was announced; the director had to have a concept of how the theatre would operate in 2016 (Lublin was competing for the title of the European Capital of Culture). Karolina Rozwód, associated with the City Hall, TVP Kultura and the Polish Film Institute, became the director.

On February 16, 2012, an open day was announced and the renovated interior of the Old Theatre was presented. The first performance after the renovation took place on March 11, 2012, attended by the President of the Republic of Poland, Bronisław Komorowski. The artistic activity of the Old Theatre was inaugurated with a concert of flamenco guitarist José Fernández Torres and his band. The concert entitled "Luz de Guia" was broadcast by TVP Kultura and on a big screen on the former parish square in Lublin[4], the whole event was hosted by Grażyna Torbicka.
