= Antoni Szałowski =

Polish composer

- Born: 21 April 1907; Warsaw, Poland
- Died: 21 March 1973 (aged 65); Paris, France
- Occupation: composer
- Style: Neoclassical

Antoni Szałowski (21 April 1907 – 21 March 1973) was a Polish composer.

== Early life and education ==
Antoni Szałowski was born on 21 April 1907 in Warsaw, Poland. Beginning at the age of 5, he studied violin with his father who was a concert violinist and music teacher. In his later youth he became more interested in piano, conducting, and composition. He was a student at the Warsaw Conservatoire (WC) from 1919 to 1930. His teachers there included Paweł Lewiecki (piano), Kazimierz Sikorski (music composition), and Grzegorz Fitelberg (conducting). After graduating from WC with an honors diploma in 1930, he was the recipient of a government grant which enabled him to pursue further music studies in Paris at the École Normale de Musique de Paris with Nadia Boulanger. He was her pupil from 1931 to 1936; writing mainly chamber music during this period.

== Career ==
Szałowski composed three string quartets between 1928 and 1936 which were all performed successfully in Paris. His orchestral work Overture (1936) became an international success. It was the final composition that he wrote while studying with Boulanger. It was awarded the gold medal at the Exposition Internationale des Arts et Techniques dans la Vie Moderne in 1937. Parisian music critic and composer Florent Schmitt praised the piece as the best new music composition of the 1936-1937 concert season. It was the most successful composition of his career.

He served as president of the Society of Young Polish Musicians (SYPM) in Paris from 1936 to 1948; having previously been a member since 1931 and serving as the organization's treasurer in 1933 and vice-president in 1936. During his tenure as president the organization was generously supported financially by pianist and composer Ignacy Jan Paderewski. When World War II broke out he enlisted in the Polish Army stationed in France, but was not mobilized after a cease fire was announced in 1940. In order to protect the archives of the SYPM during the war, he, along with Michał Spisak and Henryk Szeryng, moved the archives from Paris to Southern France. They were first moved to Biarritz, followed by further transfers to Vichy, Hyeres, and finally Aix-les-Bains.

Szałowski continued to compose during the war; producing his orchestral Sinfonietta (1940), Partita for orchestra (1942), Concertino for strings (1942), Three Folksongs (1942), and the ballet The Magic Inn (1945). In the final years of the war he lived in hiding in Aix-les-Bains in Nazi occupied France.He was sought by the Nazis and survived under great financial strain and with fear of being arrested. He moved back to Paris in 1945 at the war's end.

Several of Szałowski's compositions were performed at the ISCM World Music Days, an annual music festival held under the auspices of the International Society for Contemporary Music, both before and after the war. These included performances of his Overture at the 1939 festival in Warsaw, his String Quartet no. 3 at the 1941 festival in New York City, his Sonatina for oboe at the 1948 festival in Amsterdam, and his ballet suite, The Magic Inn, at the 1954 festival in Frankfurt, Germany.

In 1959 Szałowski married Teresa Bończa-Uzdowska. She inspired the creation of two of his compositions made in 1960, a cantata for women's chorus, and his symphonic work Wskrzeszenie Łazarza (English: Lazarus’s Resurrection). The Office de Radiodiffusion Télévision Française awarded its composition prize to Szałowski in 1960 for his radio score La femme tétue. In 1966 they moved to Franconville, Val-d'Oise just outside Paris, and in 1970 he became a French citizen, largely due to the advocacy of Nadia Boulanger. He died in Paris on March 21, 1973.
