= Maciej Małecki =

Polish musician

Maciej Małecki (bornt 27 November 1940) is a Polish composer and pianist.

He studied at the Frederic Chopin Academy of Music (graduating 1965) and the Eastman School of Music, Rochester, New York. From 1993 to 1996 he was president of the Polish Composers' Association.

== Selected works ==
- Cicha noc - Silent night, symphony of Polish carols. - recording Carus, Germany.
