= Piotr Tomaszewski =

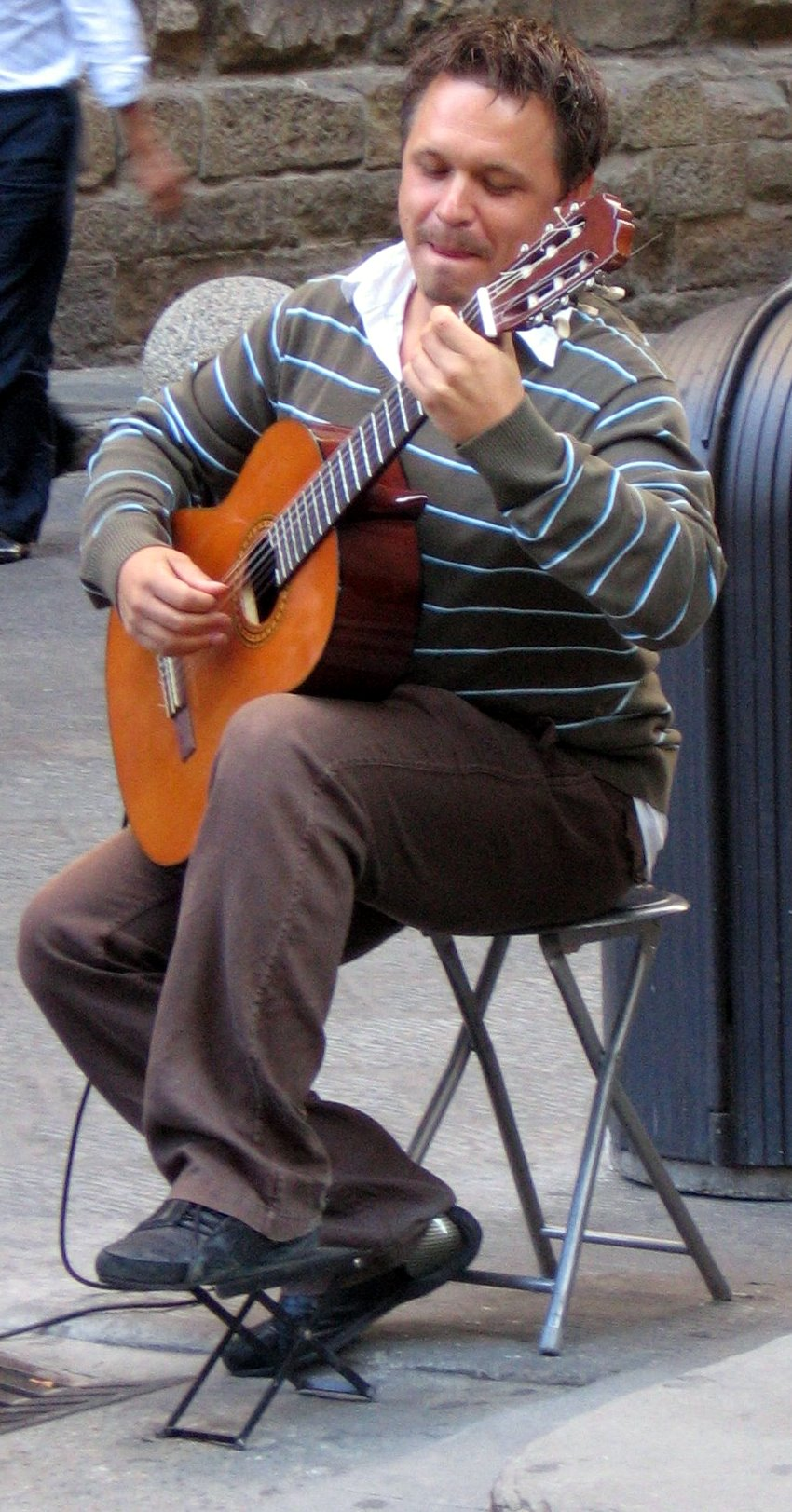
- Tomaszewski performing in Florence, 2007

Background information
- Instrument: Classical guitar
- Years active: 1988—present

Piotr Tomaszewski is a classical guitarist from Poland. He has studied classical guitar since 1990 and has won awards in several competitions, as well as being a guest performer at festivals and events around Europe. Tomaszewski's repertoire includes guitar concertos and works for solo guitar, playing both modern pieces and classical works of centuries past. He also records for Spain's Channel 10, and for Polish Radio and Television.

== Early years and study ==
Tomaszewski was born in Gostynin, Poland, in 1974. He received his first guitar lesson at a cultural centre in Płock, when he was ten years old. Beginning in 1990, Tomaszewski attended Warsaw's Fryderyk Chopin Music Academy, studying under Ryszard Bałauszko. He later completed his studies under Bałauszko at the Białystok branch of the academy. As a postgraduate, Tomaszewski studied in 1998 and 1999 at both the Conservatorio de Musica in Las Palmas, in Spain, under Carlos Oramas, and with Alberto Ponce at the École Normale de Musique de Paris.

== Competitions ==
As a competitor in several guitar competitions, Tomaszewski has been successful. Performing in the Guitar Competition in Warsaw in 1988, he received first prize, and claimed second prize later that year at the National Guitar Competition, held in Strzelce Krajeńskie, aged 14 years. Two years later, he picked up third prize in Kraków, at the 5th International Guitar Competition. Notably, he was the best of the Polish entries and also the youngest competitor. Also in 1990 he competed in Koszalin for the International Music Schools Competition and finished in second place. For finishing first at the International Guitar Competition in Kraków in 1995, Tomaszewski received a guitar made by Manuel Contreras. He placed first two years later at the Blas Sánchez Foundation's II International Competition, which was held in Ingenio (Gran Canaria), Spain. He placed first again that same year at the VII International Guitar Competition in Las Palmas. Although he only received fourth prize, Tomaszewski was the only Polish competitor at the 1998 Alexandre Tansman International Competition for Musical Personalities, held in Łódź.

== Performances and recordings ==
Tomaszewski travels around Europe and the United States to perform, frequenting Italy, Austria, Poland, Germany, Spain, and more. He also actively gives concerts, and has done, from the beginning of his career.

He has recorded an album titled Los Colores de la Guitarra, featuring the music of several renowned composers, such as Roland Dyens, Alexandre Tansman, and Joaquín Rodrigo. He currently performs in Florence, Italy, moving around but can almost always be found near the Uffizi Gallery in Piazza della Signoria.

== Discography ==
- Los Colores de la Guitarra (1999)
- Los Colores de la Guitarra 2 (1999)
