= Wiktor Łabuński =

American pianist and conductor (1895–1974)

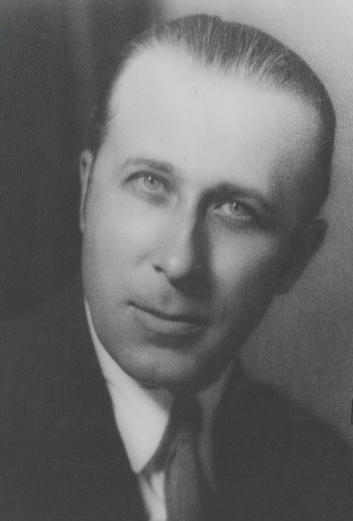
- Born: April 14, 1895; St. Petersburg, Russia
- Died: January 26, 1974 (aged 78); Kansas City, Missouri

Wiktor Łabuński (April 4, 1895 – January 26, 1974), was a Polish-American pianist, conductor and composer. He came to the United States in 1928, where he made his debut as a pianist at Carnegie Hall.

He was head of the piano department of Kraków Conservatory of Music in Krakow, Poland; he taught at the Nashville Conservatory of Music; he was a professor and director at the Memphis College of Music; and was the director of the Kansas City Conservatory of Music, where he eventually retired from.

Well known for his lecture-recitals, he had a repertory of more than 1500 works. His own compositions are in a conventional style.

== Early life and education ==
Wiktor Łabuński was born on April 4, 1895, in St. Petersburg, Russia to Stanislaw and Lydia Łabuński. His father was an engineer and an amateur basso, and his mother was a pianist. His older brother is the French-trained composer Felix Labunski. Felix and Wiktor both studied at the St. Petersburg Conservatory in St. Petersburg, Russia. Wiktor received his piano training under Felix Blumenfeld, and composition he learned from Jāzeps Vītols. He later studied with Vasily Safonov, Eugen d'Albert and Emil Młynarski was his teacher in conducting.

== Career ==
He made his debut in 1912 performing the "Emperor" concerto of Beethoven with orchestra in St. Petersburg. When World War I broke out, his musical career was put on hold. He served as a lieutenant in the Russian army during the war and then later became a member of the Polish army. By 1919, he was living in Poland and became head of the piano department at the University of Kraków, where he remained from 1919 to 1928. During this period he gave solo recitals and played with orchestras in Poland, Germany, France, London, England, Scotland, Austria, Romania and Russia. Notable performances were with the Orchestre Lamoureux in Paris, the Bucharest Symphony Orchestra, the Royal Scottish National Orchestra in Glasgow and the Warsaw National Philharmonic Orchestra.

In 1928, he came to the United States, where his first appearance was at Carnegie Hall. That same year he took a position at the Nashville Conservatory of Music, where he was head of the piano department from 1928 to 1931. From 1931 to 1937, he was a professor and director at the Memphis College of Music. In 1937 he joined the piano faculty of the Kansas City Conservatory, and transitioned to the director of the conservatory in 1941. He stepped down as the director in 1958, but remained at the conservatory as professor emeritus and an artist-in-residence, concentrating on teaching. He also taught Russian at the Metropolitan Junior College, and continued to compose music and filled in as a guest conductor, including with the Kansas City Philharmonic.

In 1935, Łabuński was granted an honorary degree of Doctor of Music by the Curtis Institute of Music in Philadelphia. He had a repertory of more than 1500 works, and in North America, he performed and conducted, and was broadcast over the radio in New York, Tennessee, Mississippi, Arkansas, Texas, Kentucky and Canada. His own compositions are in a conventional style.

During his residency in Kansas City, he became a local celebrity, and performed over two hundred piano recitals in the region. In honor of his 70th birthday, Kansas City mayor Ilus W. Davis proclaimed April 14, 1965 as 'Wiktor Labunski Day'. In 1971, Łabuński was inaugurated into the Kansas City Musical Club as an honorary member.

== Selected reviews ==
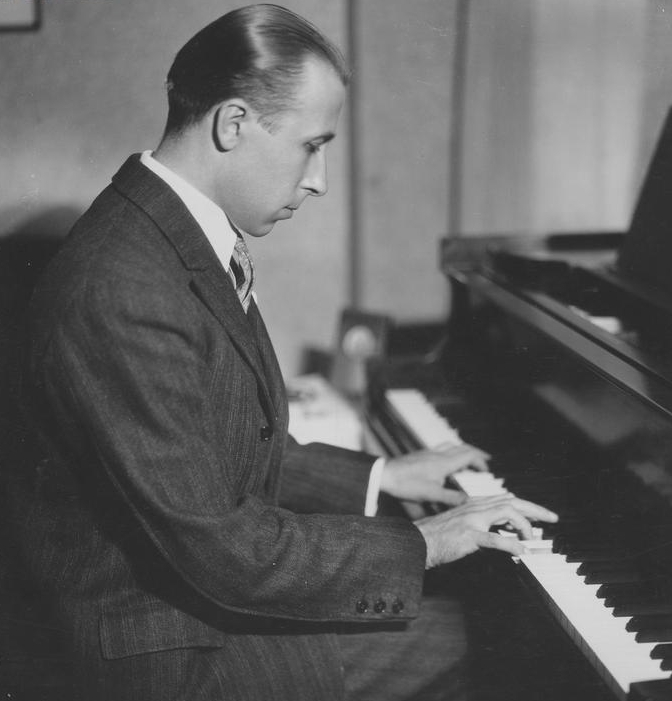
Wiktor Łabuński between 1929 and 1931

Canadian journalist Augustus Bridle reviewed Łabuński's performance of Paderewski's Polish 'Fantasia' for the Toronto Star in 1929, writing it was a "jolly good show" and that Łabuński "exhibited every item there is in the piece to the best possible advantage, and he has a wonderful instantaneous command of the piano and knows how to make it fling a tonal picture". He went on to say that "every note clicked, every phrase was perfect of its kind, in spite of what was often amateur orchestration, he kept a series of garish episodes strung together in a sequence, and left no doubt of his ability to play very much bigger things".

In 1955, Canadian music critic Ross Parmenter reviewed his piano program at The Town Hall in New York City. His performance included one of his pieces titled 'Patterns'. Parmenter said his playing on 'Unser Drummer Poebel meint' had been "most persuasive when the music was delicate and innocent". He was impressed with the second piece titled 'Brisk and Sharp', saying he played those passages with a "certain flair". He noted with disappointment that at times, Łabuński's "playing was limited, and that one felt a want of temperament and poetic intensity". He opined that "perhaps his teaching duties have not allowed him to do all the practicing he would like, for there were times when he was hesitant and scamped notes in the passages that were heavy and thunderous".

== Personal life ==
External image
- Wiktor Łabuński and wife Wanda Łabuński with sons Stanislaw (to the right), and Bronislaw (in the back), photograph from the March 29, 1947 issue of The Independent

In 1920, he married Wanda Młynarski in Warsaw, Poland. She was the daughter of Emil Młynarski, who Łabuński had studied under for conducting. The couple had two sons, both born in Poland. Wanda's sister Aniela, was married to Arthur Rubinstein, and were frequent visitors to Kansas City. Wanda died in May 1968, and Łabuński died on January 26, 1974.

== Discography ==
- Complete Piano Works AP0473 Acte *Préalable 2020: Sławomir Dobrzański piano, Magdalena Prejsnar, piano

== See also ==
- List of Polish composers
- List of Poles
- Ignacy Jan Paderewski
