= Anton de Kontski =

Polish-American musician (1816–1899)

Anton de Kontski Antoni Kątski
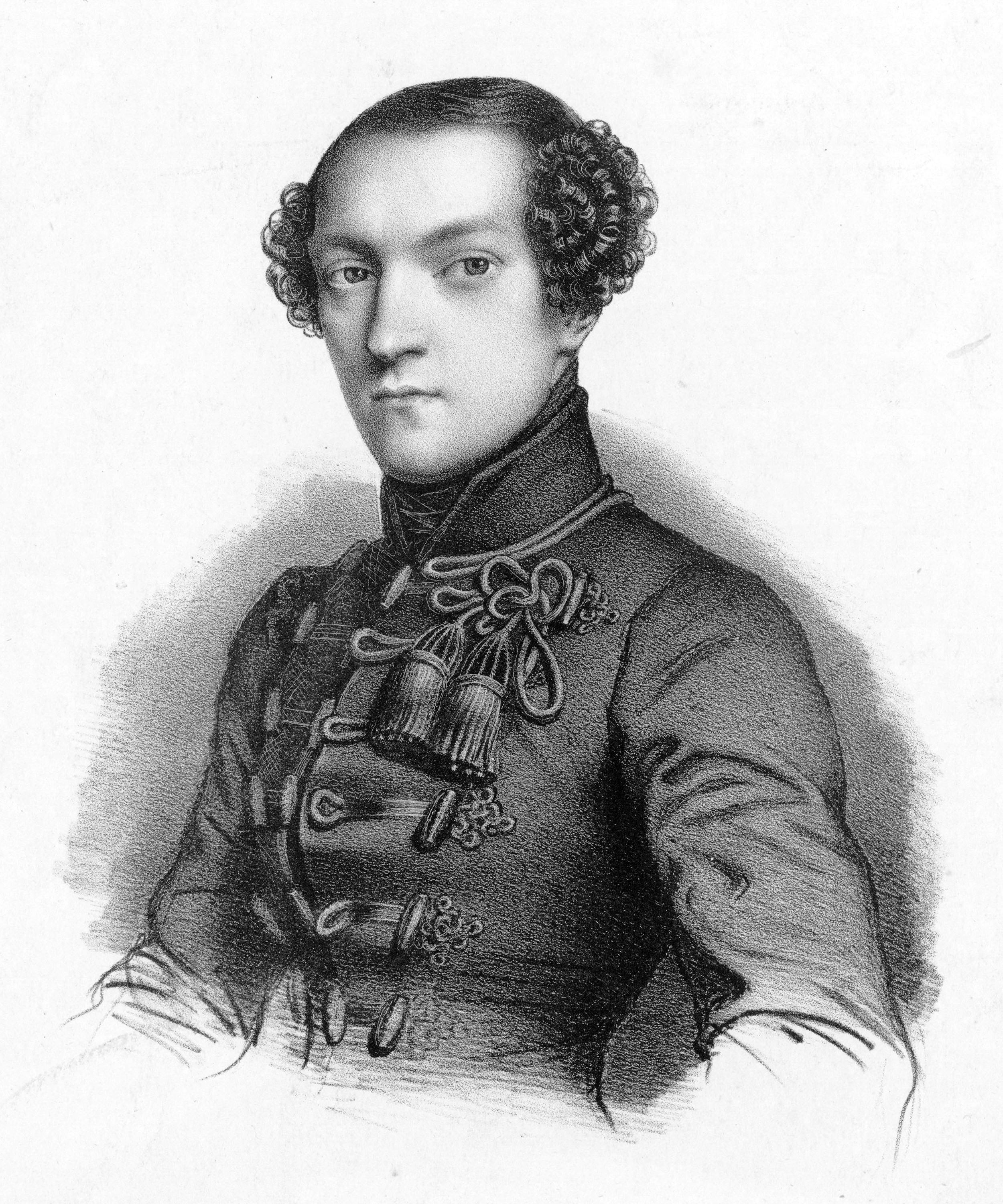

Background information
- Also known as: Chevalier Antoine de Kontski
- Born: 25 September 1816; Kraków, Poland
- Died: 7 December 1899 (aged 83)
- Genres: Classical, romantic
- Occupations: Musician, composer
- Instrument: Piano
- Award: Order of the Immaculate Conception
- Relatives: Apollinaire de Kontski (brother)

Anton de Kontski (25 September 1816 – 7 December 1899) was a Polish-American pianist and composer. He was also known as Antoni Kątski and Antoine de Kontski, sometimes with the appellation "Chevalier."

== Early life ==
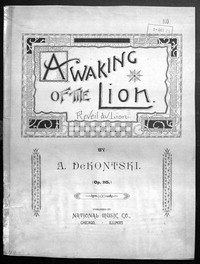
Cover of sheet music for "Awakening the Lion".

Born in Kraków, Anton de Kontski was one of five children, all musical. His sister Eugenia (b. 1816) was a singer; brother Stanislaw (b. 1820) a pianist who taught piano in Paris and composed salon pieces; brother Apolinary (1825–1879) a virtuoso violinist, composer and teacher who debuted at age five at the St. Petersburg court, studied with Paganini, toured Europe, and finally settled in Warsaw where in 1860 he founded the Music Institute; and brother Karol (1815–1867), violinist and composer, member of the orchestra of the Opéra-Comique in Paris.

== Career ==
Anton himself was a pianist and composer, a student of John Field in Moscow and a child prodigy. He also studied composition with Simon Sechter and piano with Sigismond Thalberg in Vienna. In 1845, in Paris, he performed in a concert at the Czartoryski salon together with Frédéric Chopin. In 1849, he appeared in concerts in Spain and Portugal.

Kontski reorganized the National Conservatory in Lisbon and for his efforts was awarded for the Order of Immaculate Conception. In the years 1851–1853, Kontski resided in Berlin, where he served as the court pianist to the King of Prussia. At that time, he gave concerts in Greece, Turkey, Egypt and Italy. In the years 1854–1867 he lived in St. Petersburg, where he organized an Amateur Music Society. He subsequently spent 16 years in London. Kontski settled in the United States in 1883 and resided first in Buffalo, New York, then in Grand Rapids, Michigan and San Francisco. He became a naturalized US citizen in 1892.

== Death and legacy ==
Two years before his death he embarked on a world tour, giving concerts in California, Macau, Hong Kong, Japan, India, Thailand, the Philippines, Persia, and many provinces of the Russian Empire. He was the first classical pianist to give concerts in the Philippines. He was also the first musician to transcribe Azerbaijani folk music into Western notation.

His piece entitled Polish Patrol was published in Los Angeles in 1895 by The Barlett Music Co. with a portrait of the composer on the cover, and his Awaking of the Lion was very popular in 1870s California. A sign of his popularity is the fact that publication The Etude used his Dance des sorcières as their first title when they began publishing sheet music in 1883. They also published his Persian March, Op. 369 in the December 1891 issue of the magazine.

== Discography ==
- 2017: Piano Works vol. 1 (Slawomir Dobrzanski, piano) – Acte Préalable AP0388
- 2018: Piano Works vol. 2 (Sławomir Dobrzański, Agustin Muriago – piano) – Acte Préalable AP0424
- 2025: Piano Works vol. 3 (Sławomir Dobrzański – Acte Préalable AP0504

== Sources ==
- Theodore Presser biography
- Zieliński, Jarosław . "The Poles in Music." Polish Music Journal, Vol. 5, No. 2 (Winter 2002)
