= Kazimierz Gierżod =

Polish pianist

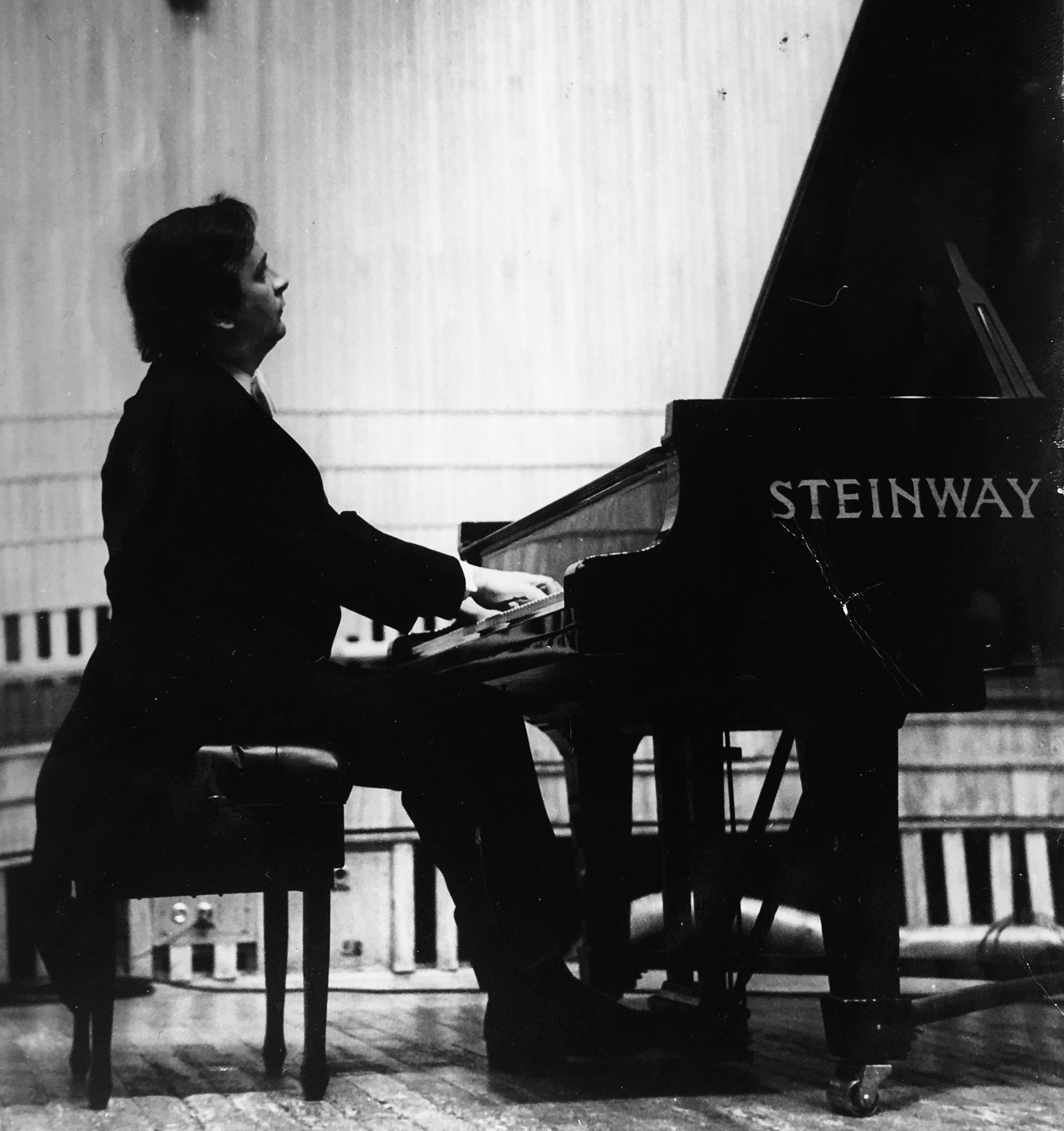
A picture of Kazimierz Gierżod

Kazimierz Gierżod (6 August 1936 in Warsaw – 1 April 2018 in Grodzisk Mazowiecki) was a Polish pianist.

Soon after graduating at Siena's Accademia Chigliana he won Gdańsk 1964 Festival of Young Musicians' 1st prize. An intercontinental career ensued. He served as rector at the Fryderyk Chopin Music Academy (1987–94), where he held a professorship.
