= Apollinaire de Kontski =

Polish violinist, teacher, and composer

Apollinaire de Kontski (2 July 1824 – 29 June 1879) was a Polish violinist, teacher, and composer.

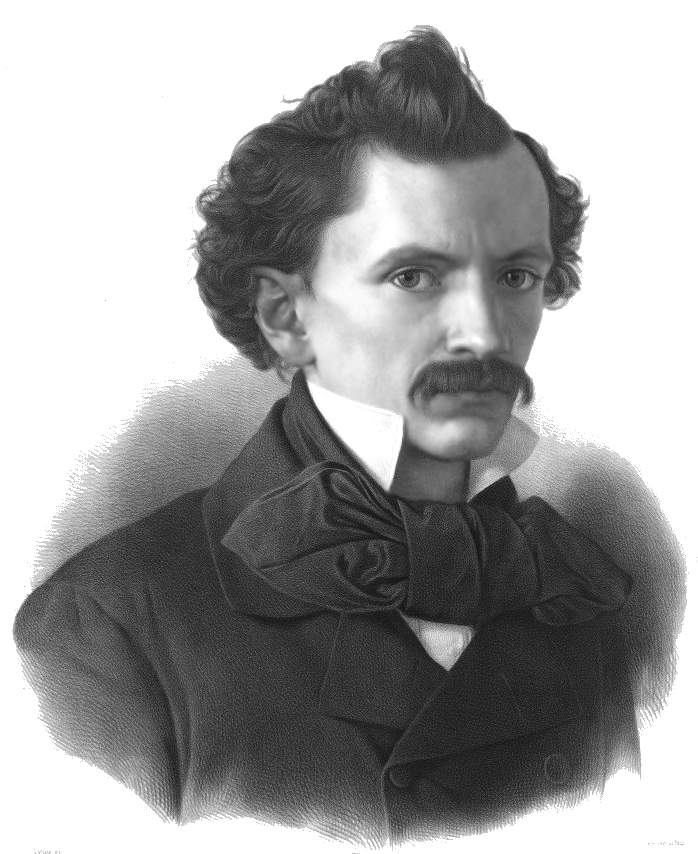
Apollinaire de Kontski (Polish: Apolinary Kątski)

== Early life ==
He was born in Warsaw (some sources say incorrectly Kraków) as Apolinary Kątski, the youngest of five musical siblings who all used the name de Kontski professionally. The others were: Charles (1813–1867), violinist; Eugenia (1815–1880), singer; Stanisław (1820–1886), pianist; Anton (1816–1899), pianist. All of them showed outstanding musical talent from a very early age, which their father, Grzegorz Kątski (1776–1844), nurtured through intensive training. At the same time, he also made sure that the young musicians would be more appealing to the public, so he subtracted two to three years from their ages, which later caused a great deal of confusion in biographical accounts about them.

He studied with his elder brother Charles de Kontski and appeared in public at the age of four, playing a concerto by Pierre Rode. He appeared in St Petersburg, France, Germany and England, making an extraordinary impression. He was praised by the likes of Hector Berlioz and Giacomo Meyerbeer. De Kontski was befriended by Niccolò Paganini in Paris, had some lessons with him, and it was said that he was even bequeathed Paganini's violins and manuscripts. This last claim appears to be without foundation, however, Paganini did give him a signed testimonial, which was published in the Musical World of 21 June 1838:

Having heard M. de Kontski, aged eleven years, perform several pieces of music on the violin, and having found him worthy of being ranked among the most celebrated artists of the present day, permit me to say, that if he continues his studies in this fine art, he will, in course of time, surpass the most distinguished performers of the age.
(Signed) PAGANINI."

== Career ==
Apollinaire de Kontski had a flair for showmanship like his brother Anton de Kontski (1816–1899) - and several other virtuosos among his contemporaries. At one concert in France in 1850, he combined pizzicato and arco in the same piece, then removed all but one string of his violin to play an aria from Meyerbeer's Robert le diable... He also wrote some pieces for violin with only one string, and with five strings (which he called "pentakords").

He also concertised with Theodor Leschetizky, Anton Rubinstein and Alexander Dargomyzhsky. He founded a string quartet, with which ensemble his pianist daughter Wanda played throughout Poland and Russia.

In 1853 he was appointed violinist to the Tsar of Russia. In 1861 he became the inaugural Director of the revived Institute of Music.

On one occasion he introduced the violinist Leopold Auer to Ignacy Jan Paderewski. The then unknown young pianist was chosen to accompany Auer at a recital at the institute. His students included Stanisław Barcewicz, Zygmunt Noskowski, Stanisław Taborowski and Konstanty Gorski.

In 1878 he performed at the Paris International Exhibition along with Henryk Wieniawski.

Apollinaire de Kontski composed a violin concerto, a quartet for four violins, 24 Études-Caprices for violin and flute, transcriptions, variations, opera fantaisies (his "Fantasia on Motives from Lucia di Lammermoor" was famous in his day) and numerous other virtuoso pieces, all now forgotten.

== Death ==
He died in his home city in 1879, aged 53.
