= Sławomir Dobrzański =

- Born: 11 May 1968 (age 57); Wrocław, Poland
- Occupation(s): pianist, teacher, musicologist
- Instrument: piano
- Website: www.dobrzanski.weebly.com

Sławomir Pawel Dobrzański (born 11 May 1968) is a pianist, teacher and musicologist.

== Biography ==
He was born in Wrocław (Poland). He is a graduate of the Chopin Academy of Music in Warsaw, where he studied with Regina Smendzianka, Andrzej Dutkiewicz and Jerzy Maciejewski. He also studied privately with Kajetan Mochtak in Warsaw. In 1992-1994 he studied at the University of Kansas in Lawrence with Jack Winerock. He also participated in summer courses in Switzerland and Poland, where he studied piano performance with Malcolm Frager, Mieczysław Horszowski and Victor Merzhanov. Additionally, he benefited from coaching sessions with Nina Tichman in Mainz, Germany, and Jan Gorbaty in New York City. In 2001, he graduated with the Doctor of Musical Arts degree from the University of Connecticut, where he was a student of Neal Larrabee and Zelma Bodzin.

== Piano career ==
Dobrzański has taken part in numerous music festivals, both as a lecturer and concert artist, among others at the International Festival of New Music in Darmstadt (1989), "Warsaw Autumn" (1990), List-Glenn Festival at California State University in Los Angeles, CA (1990, 1999), Chopin Festival in Hawaii (1993), Mid-West Society of Composers Conference in Edmond, OK (1993), Potomac River Piano Festival in Great Falls, VA (VA, 1999), the International Chopin Piano Festival for Young Pianists in Wrocław (2000), Szymanowski Festival in Beijing (2011) and "Interfest Bitola" in Macedonia (2013).

Dobrzański is the founder and former artistic director of the Chopin Society of Connecticut established in 1998. He frequently performs as soloist and chamber musician in Europe, South America, China, and throughout the United States. Dobrzański was a member of the "Atma" Piano Trio, with Blanka Bednarz (violin) and Cheung Chau (cello). The ensemble, created in 2001, regularly performed in Europe, Asia and the US.

== Writings ==
Dobrzański is the author of the first English language biography of the 19th-century pianist and composer Maria Szymanowska. Other publications (a selection):

- 2001: Maria Szymanowska and the Evolution of Professional Pianism
- 2002: Maria Szymanowska and Fryderyk Chopin: Parallelism and Influence, Polish Music Journal 5 (1)
- 2018: From Paderewski to Penderecki: The Polish Musician in Pennsylvania, The Polish Review 63 (3), 99-101

== Teaching ==
Dobrzański was a member of music faculties at Concordia College in Moorhead, Minnesota and the University of Rhode Island. He joined the Kansas State University music faculty in 2005. Currently he is Professor of Music in the School of Music, Theatre and Dance, where he teaches piano performance, chamber music and piano literature. Between 2009 and 2013, he served as the Chair of Keyboard Studies.

As a guest teacher, Dobrzański lectured and conducted masterclasses at national conservatories in Peru, Paraguay, Slovakia, and Singapore, as well as at the National Autonomous University of Mexico, Universidad de Cuenca in Ecuador, Hong Kong Baptist University, Aletheia University and National Sun Yat-sen University in Taiwan, Universidade Federal do Rio Grande do Sul in Porto Alegre in Brazil, and at Keimyung University in South Korea. He collaborates with the International Piano Performance Examinations Committee in Taichung, Taiwan.

== Discography ==
Dobrzański has recorded solo and chamber music by Witold Lutosławski, Karol Szymanowski, Fryderyk Chopin, Stefan Kisielewski, Artur Malawski (complete piano solo music), Feliks Rybicki, Carl Tausig, and Johannes Brahms for Polish Radio and Television. With the Acte Préalable label, Dobrzański has released critically acclaimed CD albums of previously unknown piano repertoire by:

- Maria Szymanowska (Complete Piano Works)
- Antoine de Kontski (Piano Works)
- Wiktor Łabuński (Complete Piano Works)
- Károly Aggházy - Works for Piano (Sławomir P. Dobrzański)
- Felix Labunski - Complete Piano Works

== Awards ==
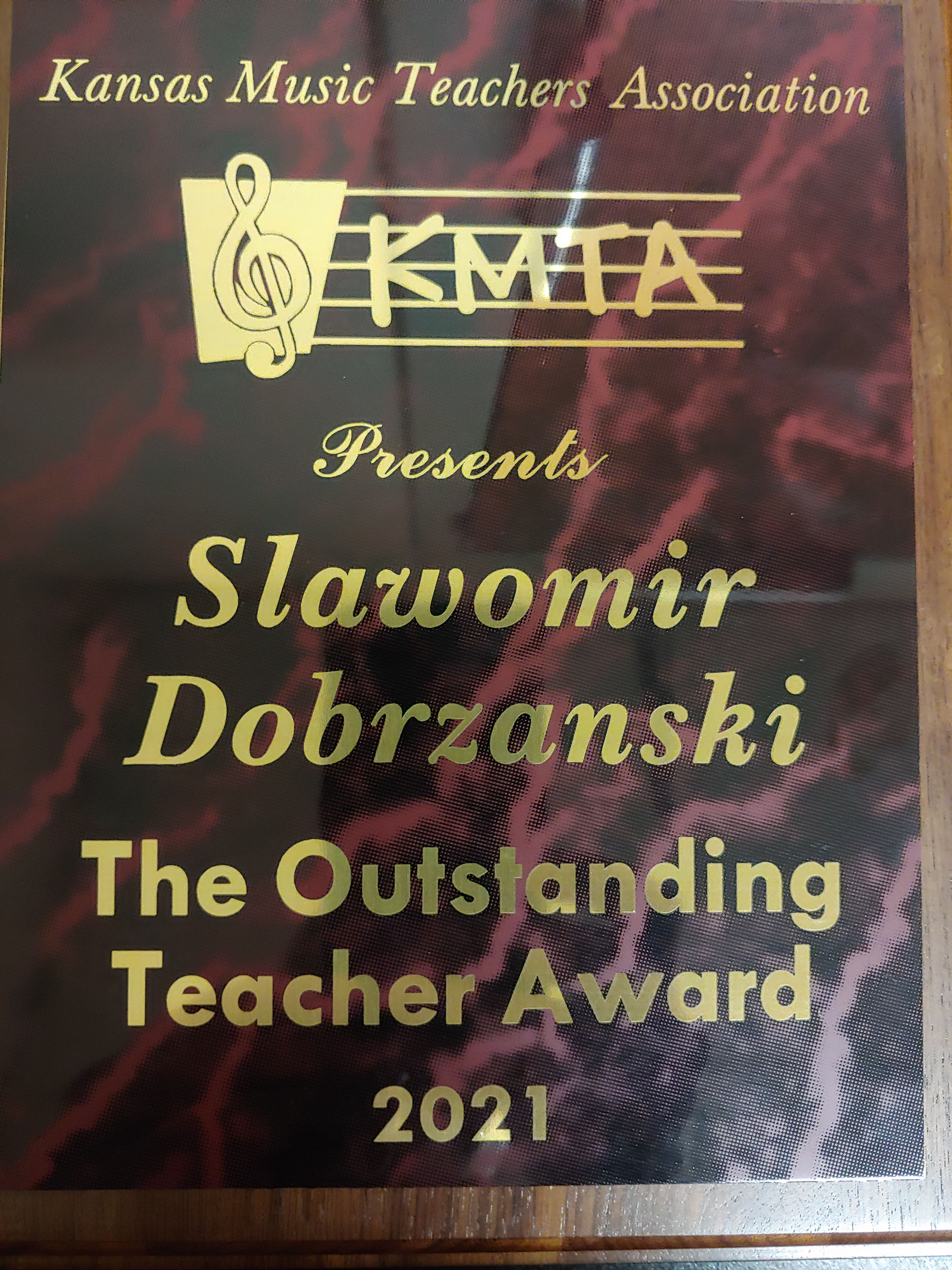
Outstanding Teacher Award won by Slawomir Dobrzanski in 2021

Dobrzański has won several competitions for young artists such as the MTNA Wurlitzer Collegiate Artist Competition in Spokane, WA (1993, National First Runner-up), the Naftzger Young Artist Competition in Wichita, KS (Grand Prize, and Piano Division Prize, 1993), the Lincoln Symphony Young Artist Competition in Lincoln, NE (First Prize, 1993) and the University of Connecticut Concerto Competition (1998).

For his contributions to Polish and Polish-American culture, in 2016 the pianist was honored by the Government of the Republic of Poland with the title "Meritorious for Polish Culture".

In 2021, he won "The Outstanding Teacher Award" sponsored by the Kansas Music Teachers Association.

In 2024 he received an Honorable Mention for the Waclaw Lednicki Award in Humanities "for Complete Piano works of Feliks Labunski", awarded by the Polish Institute of Arts & Sciences in America.
