= Joachim Grubich =

Polish organist (1935–2025)

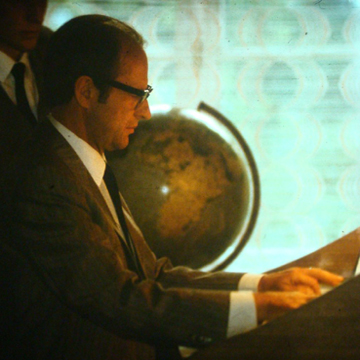
- Grubich in 1985
- Born: Joachim Antoni Grubich; 16 January 1935; Chełmno, Poland
- Died: 16 August 2025 (aged 90)
- Occupations: Concert organist; Academic teacher
- Organization: Chopin University of Music
- Awards: Gloria Artis Medal for Merit to Culture

Joachim Antoni Grubich (16 January 1935 – 16 August 2025) was a Polish concert organist who performed internationally and an academic teacher. He served as head of the department of organ and harpsichord at the Academy of Music in Warsaw. He participated in the reconstruction of the organ in St. Anne's Church in Warsaw, and the building of a new organ in the Philharmonic Hall.

== Life and career ==
Grubich was born on 16 January 1935 in Chełmno, where he attended the Nicolaus Copernicus Primary and Secondary School. From 1956 to 1961, he studied at the State Higher School of Music in Kraków, under Artur Malawski, Ludwik Stefański and Bronisław Rutkowski. In 1961, he began working in the music department of Radio Kraków. He returned to the Academy to teach, starting in 1964, and became a full-time professor.

He became professor at the Academy of Music in Warsaw, where he also served as the head of the department of organ and harpsichord. He was a visiting professor of postgraduate studies in Seoul from 1994 to 1995.

As a performer, he made his debut at the International Organ Festival in Oliwa in 1960. He garnered international recognition upon winning the National Early Music Competition in Łódź in 1961. He achieved the first prize of the Geneva International Music Competition the following year. He performed with symphony orchestras in Poland and abroad, in halls such as the Royal Festival Hall in London, De Doelen in Rotterdam, the Gewandhaus in Leipzig, Konzerthaus Berlin, Victoria Hall in Geneva, Crystal Cathedral in Garden Grove, California, and Strasbourg Cathedral. He appeared in television programs in Poland, Romania and the United States, and served as a juror of organ competitions around the world.

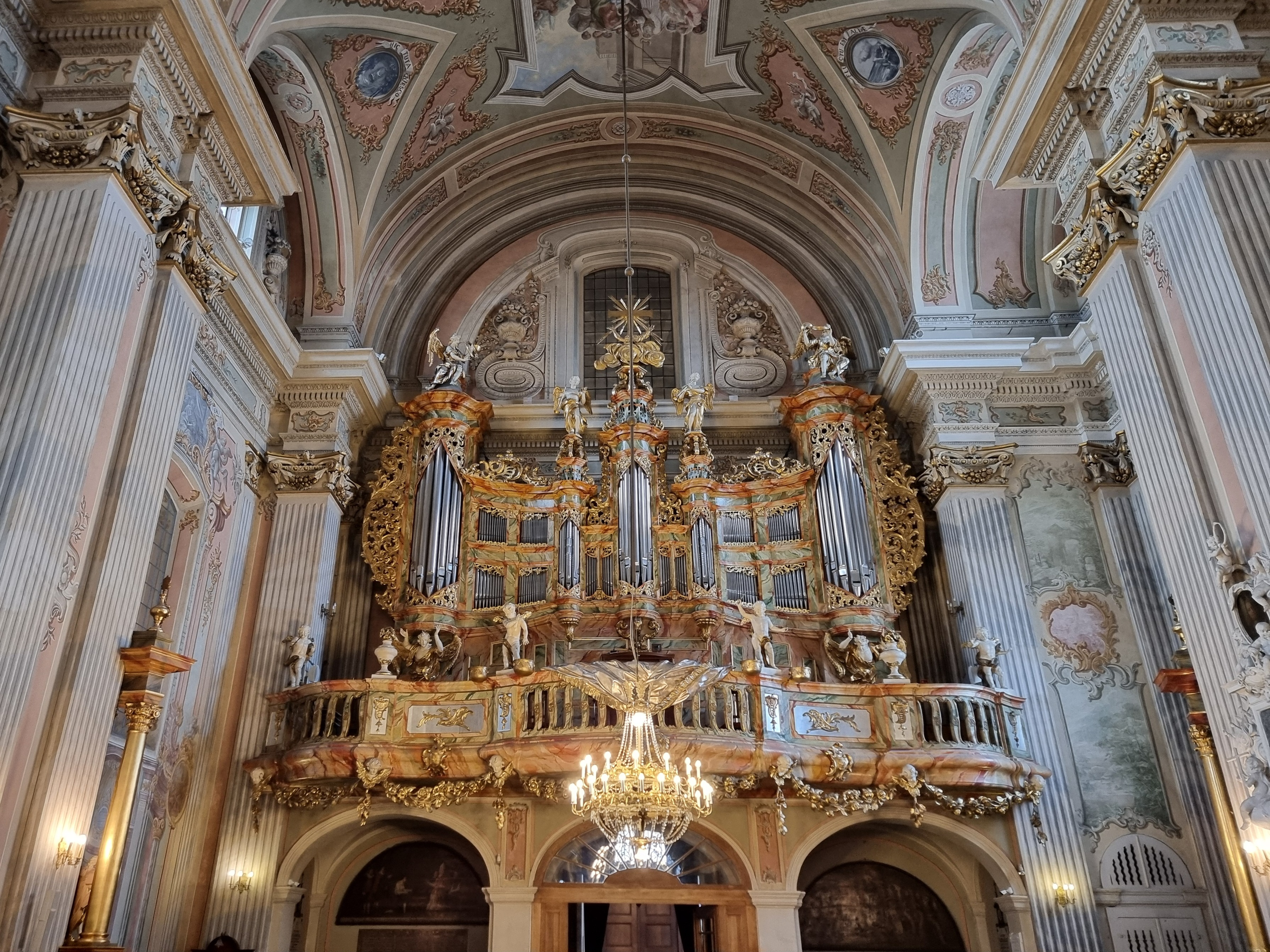
Organ of St. Anne's church

Grubich recorded more than 30 albums. He participated in the reconstruction of the organ in St. Anne's Church in Warsaw, and in the building of new instruments in Warsaw's Philharmonic Hall. His album "Organs of St. Anne's Church in Warsaw" (Organy kościoła św. Anny w Warszawie) was nominated for the 1996 Fryderyk Award as the Album of the Year – Solo Music in the classical music category. In 2004, he won the same award for the album "An Organ Evening in the Lublin Philhamonic" („Wieczór organowy w Filharmonii Lubelskiej”).

In 2015, Grubich was awarded the gold medal of the Gloria Artis Medal for Merit to Culture.

In March 2025, he was bestowed the Golden Fryderyk Award, an honorary lifetime achievement award for his career as a musician, educator, and leader in Polish organ music.

Grubich died on 16 August 2025, at the age of 90.
