= Helena Modrzejewska Theatre =

Coordinates: 51.2075°N 16.1606°E

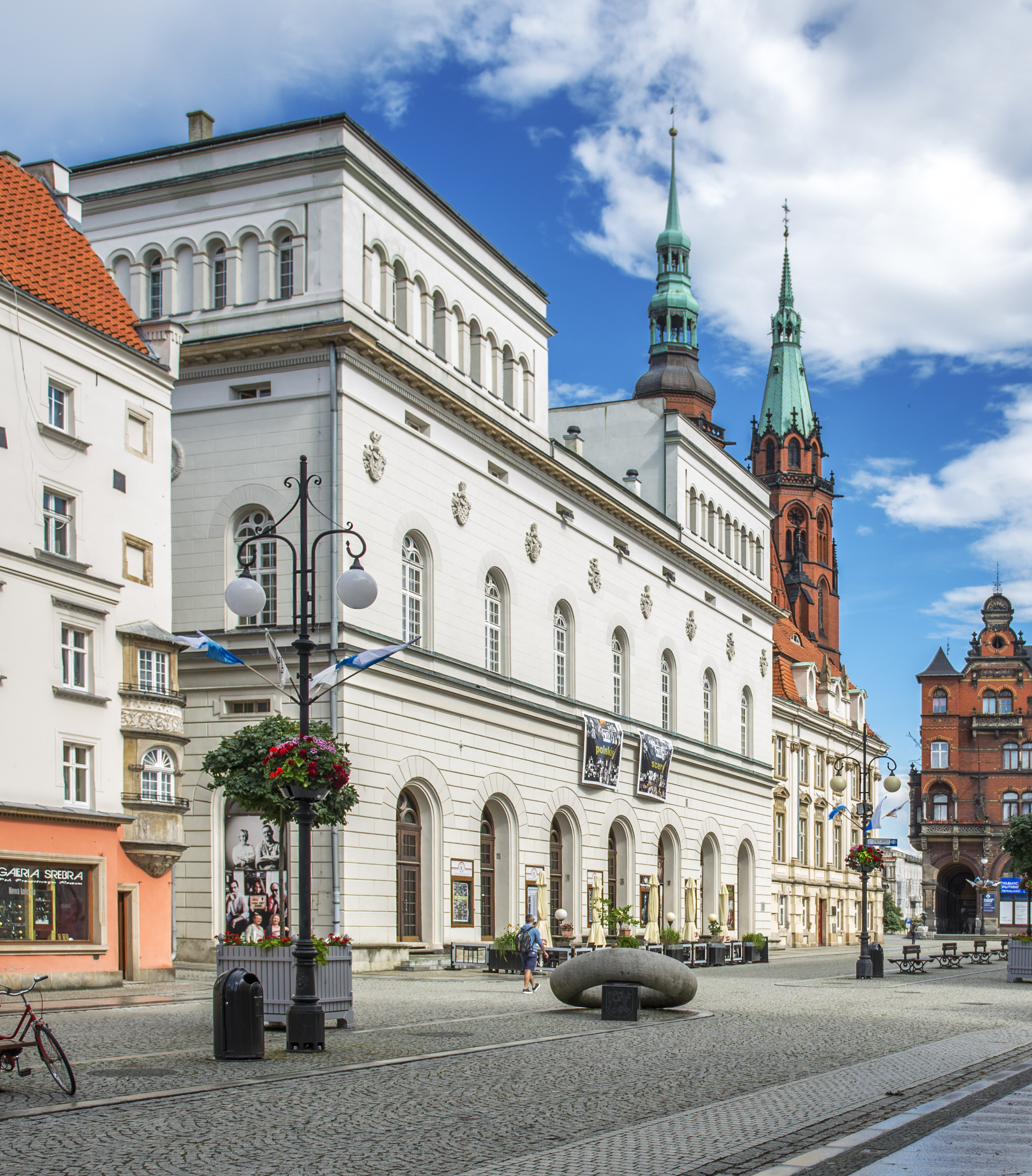
H. Modrzejewska Theatre building on the Legnica market square

The Helena Modrzejewska Theatre in Legnica, Poland - a state drama theater, operating in the building of the former opera-theater from the mid-19th century. In 1991 the building was entered into the register of historical monuments (district number: 590/963/L of 17.06.1991).

== Impresario period ==
The building of the theater was designed by Carl Ferdinand Langhans the younger, creator of the Breslau Opera House. It replaced the former cloth halls. The building was modelled on the Strozzi Palace in Florence. The ceremonial opening of the stage on 25 December 1842 was accompanied by the staging of Friedrich Halm's play "The Son of the Wilderness" (Der Sohn der Wildnis). The next performance was matched by such interest that soldiers from the local garrison were assigned to keep order, however, this did not prevent riots and breaking windows.

For almost the entire first century of its activity in the new building, the theater did not have a permanent ensemble and functioned on the basis of guest service (impresariat). Both theatrical performances as well as opera and operetta shows were performed.

Between 1891 and 1893, the building was adapted to fire regulations; evacuation routes and an iron curtain were installed. The theater was modernized again in 1938–1939.

== Multi-department theater ==
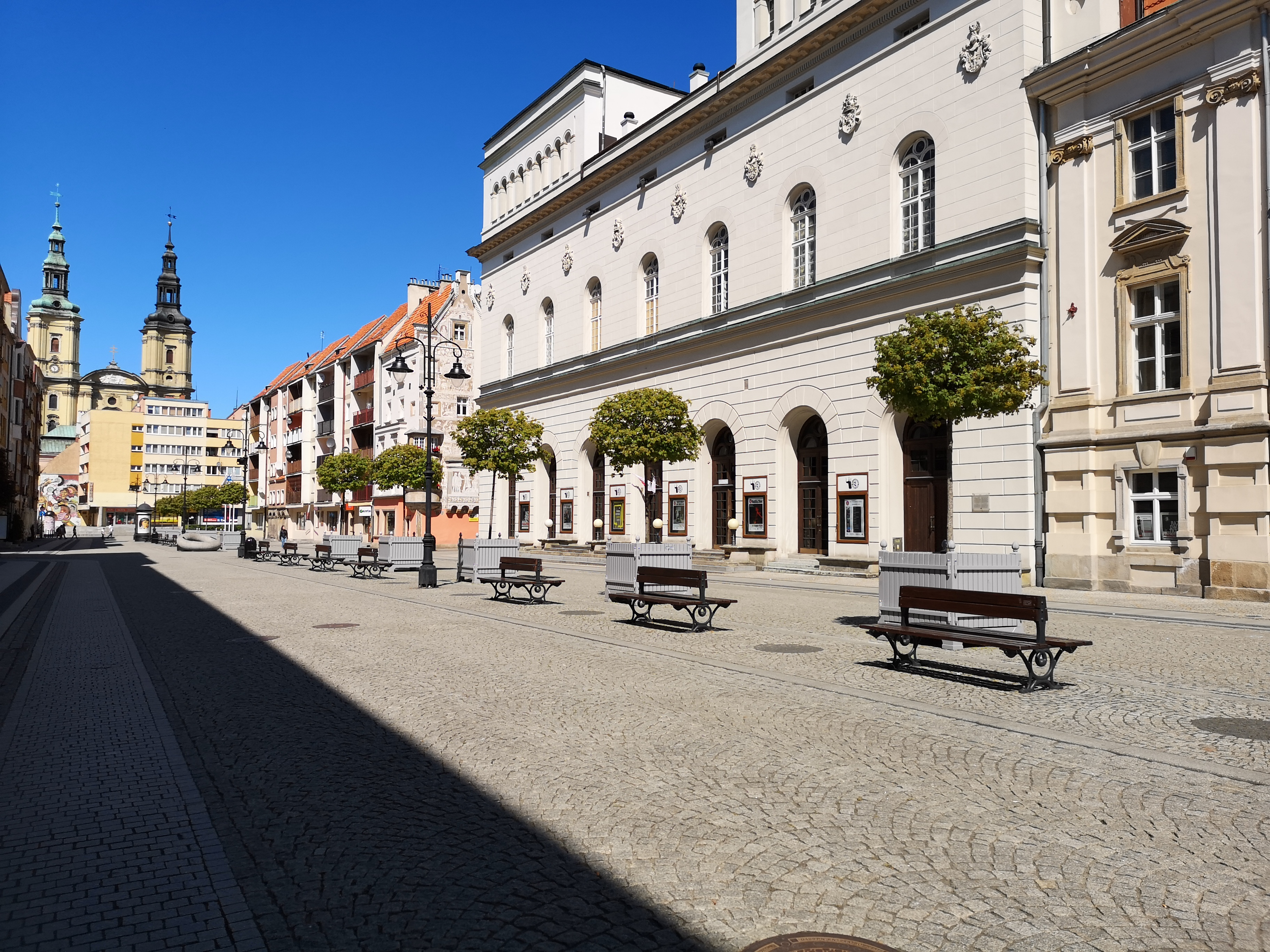
Helena Modrzejewska Theatre in Legnica

Since 1933, a permanent multi-departmental theater was opened in Liegnitz, headed by a commissary. Richard Rückert was the director of the theater from 1938 to 1943. During this time, both trivial farces and operettas were staged, as well as serious dramas and operas, including works by Wagner. Among the dramatic works, there was no shortage of works by Nazi supporters or German classics (Goethe, Schiller, Lessing), or contemporary works (such as Hauptmann's). Opera and theater came to an end in September 1944 with a majority of the actors being drafted into the military.

== After World War II ==
Following the end of World War II and the decisions of the Potsdam Conference, the town of Legnica was restored to Poland. Immediately afterward, the theatre building was ransacked by Red Army soldiers, who removed movable equipment and furnishings. For about 20 years following 1945, the theatre was used exclusively by the Red Army. In 1964, the building was handed over to the Polish authorities, though it had lost all its original equipment, including the curtain and heating installation.

After the creation of the Legnica Voivodeship, the local administration prioritized restoration of the theatre. Once funds were secured, construction and renovation works began, during which many of the historic, neoclassical interiors were removed. The façade of the theater was painted shortly before the official reopening. The theater reopened on November 27, 1977, with the premiere of Jaroslaw Iwaszkiewicz's play Summer at Nohant, directed by Józef Wyszomirski.

== Present day ==
Opened in 1977, the state drama theater functioned under the name „Dramatic Theatre” until 1991, then (combined with the Voivodeship House of Culture and Gallery of Art) as the „Art Center - Dramatic Theatre”. Since 1999 it bears the name of Helena Modrzejewska. The Theatre participates in the most important national reviews and festivals, winning prestigious awards (including the Competition for the Exhibition of Polish Contemporary Art, the Festival of Directing Art "Interpretations" in Katowice, the Shakespeare Festival in Gdansk, etc.); it also performs abroad (Czech Republic, Germany, Great Britain, Slovakia, Slovenia, Russia and the USA - 2009, Argentina - 2013, Turkey - 2014). The mission of the Legnica theater is to present "real stories in real places", such as old factory halls or ruined cinemas. These stories often concern Legnica, thus sustaining and preserving the identity of the city. The most important performances of the theatre include Ballada o Zakaczawiu (2000, TV version 2002), Wschody i Zachody Miasta (2003, TV version 2005), Made in Poland (2004, TV version 2005), Othello (2006), Łemko (2007), III Furie (2011, TV version 2012), Orkiestra (2011, TV version 2013). The theater organized the International Theatre Festival "City" in Legnica. (2007, 2009), where the stage consisted of ruined locations in Legnica, and co-organized the Festival of Nie-Zły Theatre (2011, 2012). Among many directors of Modrzejewska Theatre the following deserve a special mention: Jacek Głomb, Lech Raczak, Piotr Cieplak, Paweł Kamza, Ondrej Spišák, Przemysław Wojcieszek.

On November 14, 2017 the theater was awarded the Silver Medal "Gloria Artis".
