= Chopin University of Music =

Polish university

- Uniwersytet Muzyczny Fryderyka Chopina
- Type: Public
- Established: 1810; 216 years ago
- Rector: Tomasz Strahl
- Administrative staff: 509
- Students: 898
- Location: Okólnik 2 St, 00-368, Warsaw, Poland; 52°14′08″N 21°01′21″E
- Campus: Urban
- Website: www.chopin.edu.pl

The Chopin University of Music (Polish: Uniwersytet Muzyczny Fryderyka Chopina, UMFC) is a musical conservatorium and academy located in central Warsaw, Poland. It is the oldest and largest music school in Poland, and one of the largest in Europe.

== History ==
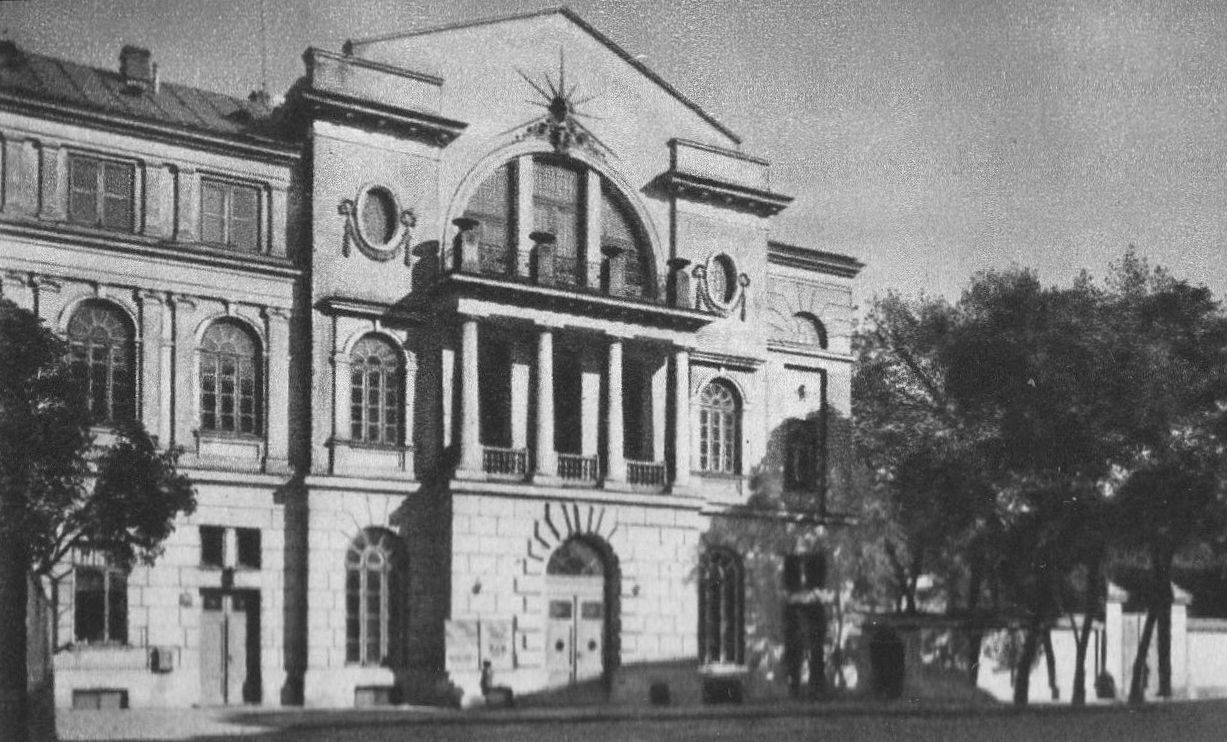
Warsaw Conservatory before the Warsaw Uprising, Okólnik Street

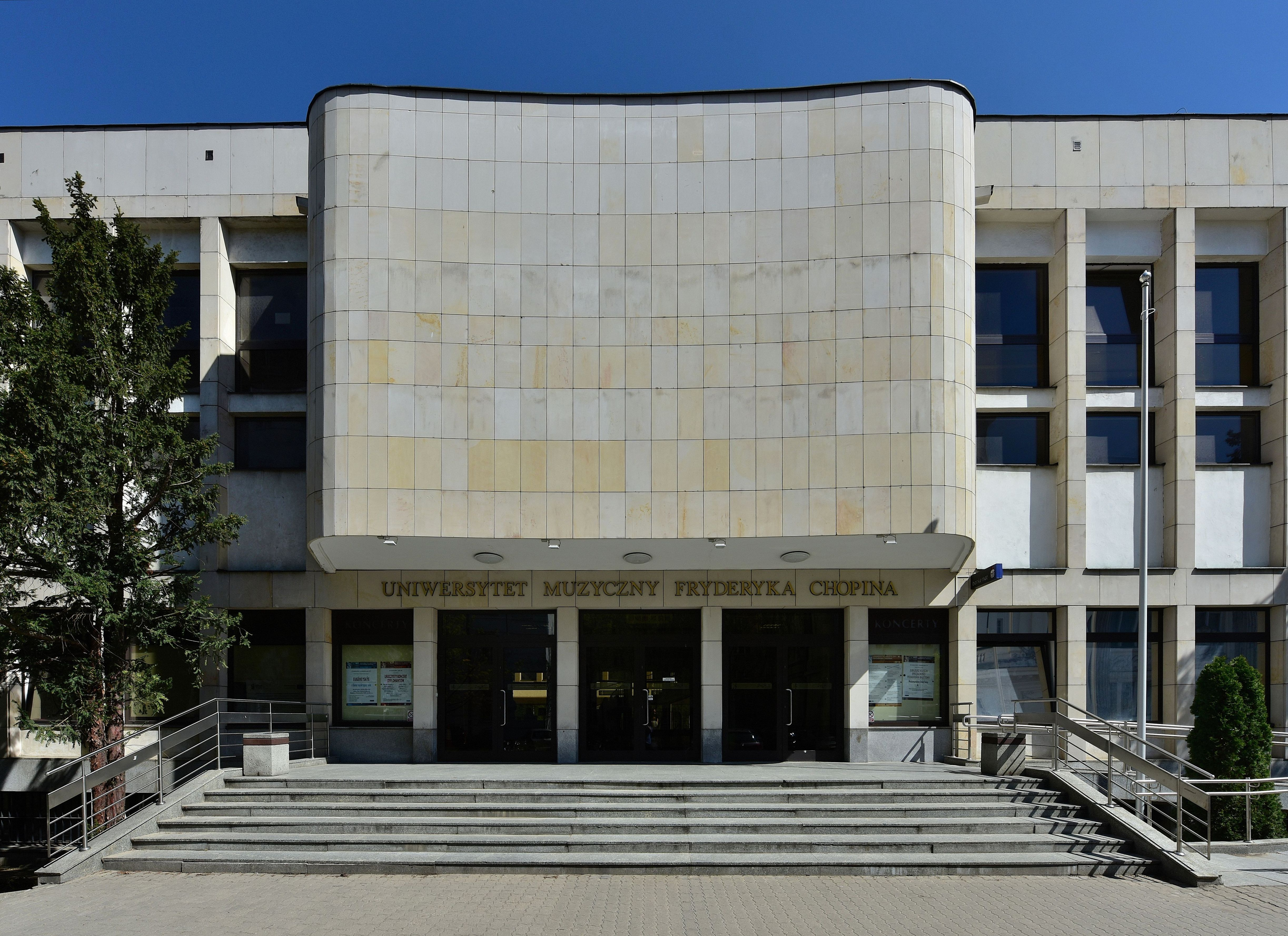
The conservatorium today

Named for the Polish composer Frédéric Chopin (whose birth name was Fryderyk Chopin and who studied there from 1826 to 1829),^{[a]} the University dates from the Music School for singers and theatre actors that was founded in 1810 by Wojciech Bogusławski. In 1820 it was transformed by Chopin's subsequent teacher, Józef Elsner, into a more general school of music, the Institute of Music and Declamation; it was then affiliated with the University of Warsaw and, together with the University, was dissolved by Russian imperial authorities during the repressions that followed the November 1830 Uprising. In 1861 it was revived as Warsaw's Institute of Music.

After Poland regained independence in 1918, the Institute was taken over by the Polish state and became known as the Warsaw Conservatory. The institution's old main building was destroyed during World War II, in the Warsaw Uprising. After the war, in 1946, the school was recreated as the Higher State School of Music. In 1979 the school assumed the name: Fryderyk Chopin Music Academy. In 2008 the school once again changed its name to the Chopin University of Music.

== Buildings ==
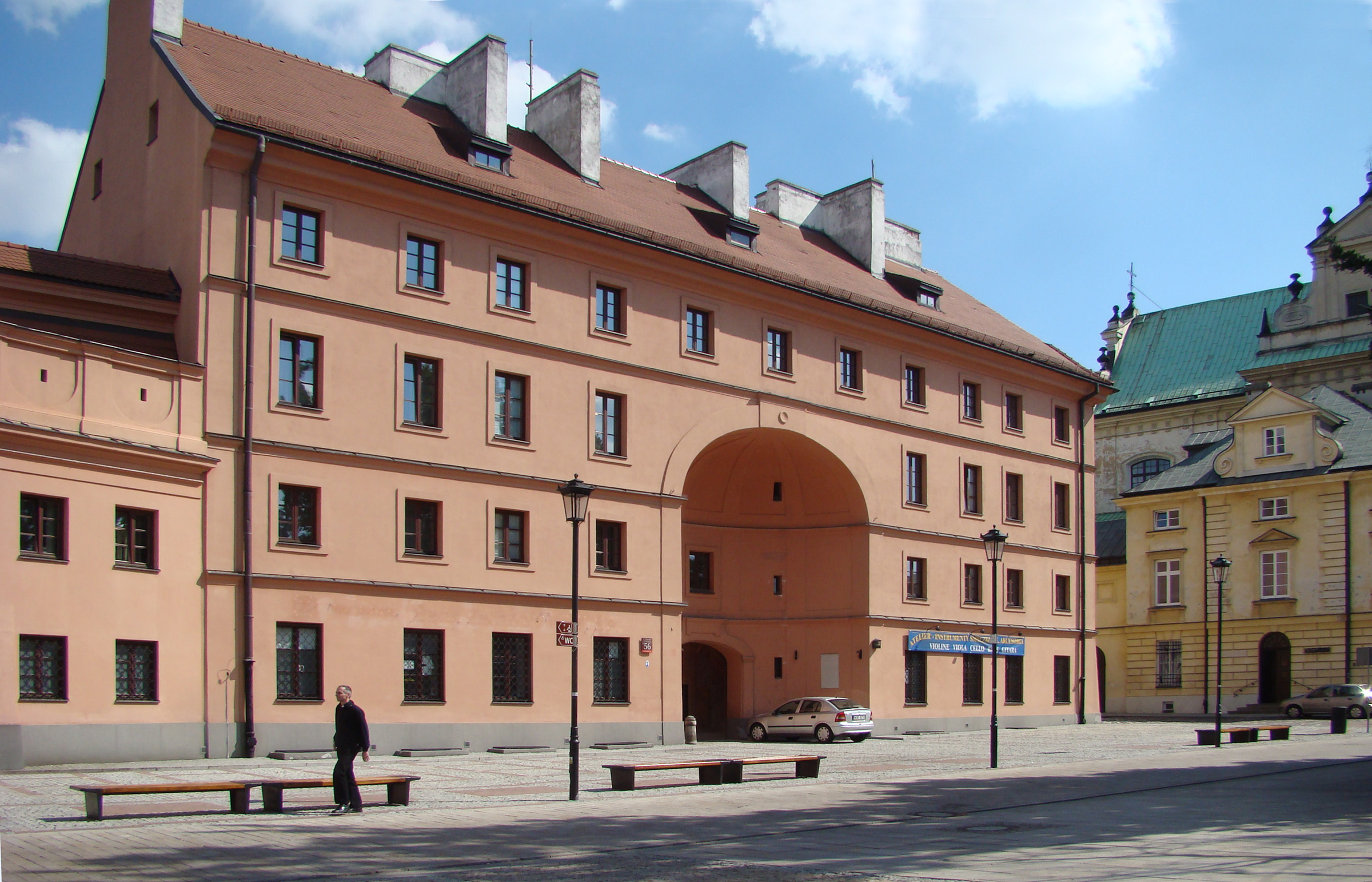
Dziekanka

The main building, at ulica Okólnik 2 in Central Warsaw, was constructed between 1960 and 1966. It contains 62 sound-proof classrooms; a concert hall (486 seats), the Szymanowski Lecture Theater (adapted for film projection; 155 seats), the Melcer Chamber Music Hall (196 seats and a Walcker organ sampled by Piotr Grabowski), the Moniuszko Opera Hall (53 seats), a rhythmics room, three music-recording and sound-track studios, a tuner's studio, a library and reading room, rector's offices, deans' offices, management offices, guest rooms, the GAMA cafeteria, and doctor's and dentist's clinics. There is also a music book shop and antiquarian book shop.

The University also has its own dormitory, Dziekanka, at 58/60 Krakowskie Przedmieście. The latter has its own 150-seat concert hall.

== Structure ==
The University is divided into the following departments:

- Department of Symphony and Orchestra Conducting
- Department of Composition and Theory of Music
- Department of Instrumental Studies
- Department of Vocal and Acting Studies
- Department of Choir Conducting and Choir Studies, Music Education and Rhythmics
- Department of Sound Engineering
- Department of Church Music
- Department of Dance
- Department of Jazz and Stage Music
- Department of Instrumental and Educational Studies, Music Education and Vocal Studies in Białystok

=== Directors and rectors ===
- Wojciech Bogusławski (1810–1814)
- Ludwik Osiński (1814−1816)
- Józef Elsner (1816–1830)
- Apolinary Kątski (1861−1879)
- Aleksander Zarzycki (1879−1888)
- Rudolf Strobl (1888−1891)
- Gustaw Roguski (1891−1903)
- Emil Młynarski (1903−1907)
- Stanisław Barcewicz (1910−1918)
- Emil Młynarski (1919−1922)
- Henryk Melcer-Szczawiński (1922−1927)
- Karol Szymanowski (1927−1929)
- Zbigniew Drzewiecki (1929−1930)
- Karol Szymanowski (1930–1931)
- Zbigniew Drzewiecki (1931–1932)
- Eugeniusz Morawski-Dąbrowa (1932−1939)
- Kazimierz Sikorski (1940−1944)
- Stanisław Kazuro (1945−1951)
- Stanisław Szpinalski (1951−1957)
- Kazimierz Sikorski (1957−1966)
- Teodor Zalewski (1966−1969)
- Tadeusz Paciorkiewicz (1969−1971)
- Regina Smendzianka (1972−1973)
- Tadeusz Wroński (1973−1975)
- Tadeusz Maklakiewicz (1975−1978)
- Bogusław Madey (1978−1981)
- Andrzej Rakowski (1981−1987)
- Kazimierz Gierżod (1987−1993)
- Andrzej Chorosiński (1993−1999)
- Ryszard Zimak (1999−2005)
- Stanisław Moryto (2005−2012)
- Ryszard Zimak (2012−2016)
- Klaudiusz Baran (2016–2024)
- Tomasz Strahl (from 2024)

=== Doctors honoris causa ===
- Igor Bełza
- Nadia Boulanger
- Plácido Domingo
- Jan Ekier
- Joachim Grubich
- Andrzej Jasiński
- Witold Lutosławski
- Andrzej Panufnik
- Arvo Pärt
- Krzysztof Penderecki
- Jean-Pierre Rampal
- Mstislav Rostropovich
- Arthur Rubinstein
- Witold Rudziński
- Jerzy Semkow
- Kazimierz Sikorski
- Stefan Śledziński
- Regina Smendzianka
- Stefan Sutkowski
- Tadeusz Wroński

=== Notable professors ===
- Tadeusz Baird
- Henryk Czyż
- Zbigniew Drzewiecki
- Irena Dubiska
- Jerzy Dziubiński
- Paweł Łukaszewski
- Witold Maliszewski
- Aleksander Michałowski
- Stanisław Moniuszko
- Witold Rudziński
- Ada Sari
- Tadeusz Szeligowski
- Karol Szymanowski
- Józef Turczyński
- Kazimierz Wiłkomirski
- Stanisław Wisłocki
- Władysław Żeleński

=== Notable students ===
- Kari Amirian
- Grażyna Bacewicz
- Thomas Böttger
- Elisabeth Chojnacka
- Frédéric Chopin
- Mikalojus Konstantinas Čiurlionis
- Sławomir Dobrzański
- Ignacy Feliks Dobrzyński
- Marian Filar
- Grzegorz Fitelberg
- Anna Iberszer
- Mieczysław Karłowicz
- Stefan Kisielewski
- Paweł Klecki
- Tomasz Konieczny
- Hilary Koprowski
- Bernard Ładysz
- Wanda Landowska
- Jerzy Lefeld
- Maciej Łukaszczyk
- Witold Lutosławski
- Jan Maklakiewicz
- Maciej Małecki
- Zygmunt Noskowski
- Jakub Józef Orliński
- Ignacy Jan Paderewski
- Andrzej Panufnik
- Adelina Paschalis-Souvestre
- Olha Pasichnyk
- Piotr Perkowski
- Sergiusz Pinkwart
- Hania Rani
- Ludomir Różycki
- Sanah
- Antoni Szalowski
- Stanisław Szpinalski
- Adam Sztaba
- Tomasz Szukalski
- Alexandre Tansman
- Piotr Tomaszewski
- Zbigniew Turski
- Eugenia Umińska
- Yana Couto
- Moshe Vilenski
- Małgorzata Walewska
- Mieczysław Weinberg
- Kazimierz Wiłkomirski
- Roger Woodward
- Justyna Zańko

== Competitions ==
The University organizes the following music competitions:

- the Tadeusz Wronski International Solo Violin Competition (Międzynarodowy Konkurs T. Wrońskiego na Skrzypce Solo)
- an International Organ Competition (Międzynarodowy Konkurs Organowy)
- the Wanda Landowska Harpsichord Competition (Międzynarodowy Konkurs Klawesynowy im. W. Landowskiej)
- the Witold Lutoslawski International Cello Competition (Międzynarodowy Konkurs Wiolonczelowy im. W. Lutosławskiego)

== Orchestras ==
The University has two orchestras: a symphony orchestra, and the Chopin University Orchestra, as well as a choir.

== Notes ==
a Since at that time the Warsaw Conservatory was affiliated with Warsaw University's Art Department, Chopin is also counted among the University's alumni.
