= List of compositions by Henryk Górecki =

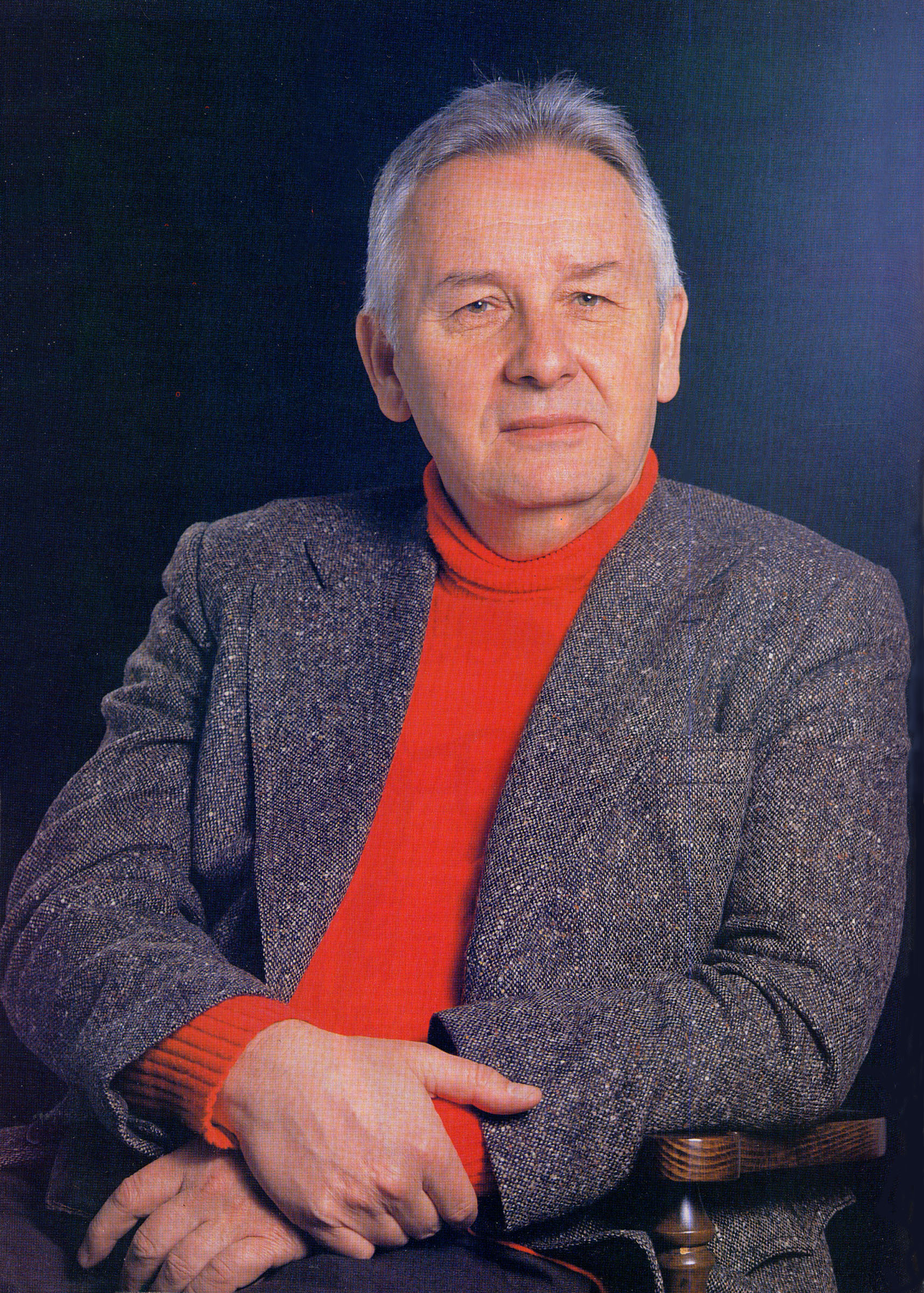
Henryk Górecki in 1993

Henryk Mikołaj Górecki (/ɡəˈrɛtski/ gə-RET-skee, Polish: [ˈxɛnrɨk miˈkɔwaj ɡuˈrɛt͡skʲi]; 6 December 1933 – 12 November 2010) was a Polish composer of contemporary classical music. This incomplete list of his compositions is sorted by opus number or date when no opus number is provided. Much of Górecki's work has been published by Boosey & Hawkes, which holds the rights for most of the world except in "countries of the former socialist copyright federation," where Polskie Wydawnictwo Muzyczne holds the rights.

== Works ==
=== Published ===
- Four Preludes, Op. 1, piano (1955)
- Toccata for two pianos, Op. 2
- Three Songs, Op. 3 (1956)
  - No. 1 Do matki – To Mother
  - No. 2 Jakiż to dzwon grobowy – What was this Funeral Bell
  - No. 3 Ptak – The Bird
- Variations for violin and piano, Op. 4
- Quartettino, Op. 5, two flutes, oboe, violin (1956)
- Piano Sonata No. 1, Op. 6, piano (1956, revised 1984, 1990)
- Songs of Joy and Rhythm, Op. 7, piano and chamber orchestra (1956, revised 1959)
- Sonatina in One Movement, Op. 8, violin and piano
- Lullaby for piano, Op. 9 (1956, revised 1980)
- Sonata for two violins, Op. 10 (1957)
- Concerto for five instruments and string quartet, Op. 11, mixed ensemble (1957)
- Epitafium, Op. 12, chorus and ensemble (1958)
  - No. 1 Preludium
  - No. 2 Chorał – Chorale
  - No. 3 Antyfona – Antiphon
  - No. 4 Postludium
- Five Pieces, Op. 13, piano duo (two pianos or piano four hands) (1959)
- Symphony No. 1 '1959', Op. 14, string orchestra and percussion (1959)
- Three Diagrams for solo flute, Op. 15
- Monologhi, Op. 16, soprano and three groups of instruments (1960)
- Scontri, Op. 17, full orchestra (1960)
- Diagram IV for solo flute, Op. 18 (1961)
- Genesis I: Elementi, Op. 19, string trio (1962)
- Genesis II: Canti Strumentali, Op. 19, 15 players (1962)
- Genesis III: Monodramma, Op. 19, soprano, metal percussion and six double basses (1963)
- Trzy tance w dawnym stylu (Three pieces in the old style), string orchestra, no Op. number (1963)
- Choros I, Op. 20, string orchestra (1964)
- Refrain, Op. 21, full orchestra (1965)
- Musiquette 1 for two trumpets and guitar, Op. 22 (1967)
- Musiquette 2, Op. 23, four trumpets, four trombones, two pianos, percussion (1967)
- Old Polish Music (Muzyka Staropolska), Op. 24, full orchestra (1969)
- Musiquette 3, Op. 25, viola ensemble (1967)
- Cantata for organ, Op. 26 (1968)
- Canticum Graduum, Op. 27, full orchestra (1969)
- Musiquette 4, Op. 28, trombone, clarinet, cello, piano (1970)
- Ad Matrem, Op. 29, chorus and orchestra (1971)
- Two Sacred Songs, Op. 30
  - No. 1 Lento sostenuto
  - No. 2 Maestoso
- Symphony No. 2 'Copernican', Op. 31, chorus and orchestra (1972)
- Euntes Ibant et Flebant, Op. 32, chorus a cappella (1972)
- Two Little Songs of Tuwim, Op. 33, chorus a cappella (1972)
  - No. 1 Rok i bieda – The Year and Hardship
  - No. 2 Ptasie plotki – Bird Gossip
- Three Dances, Op. 34, full orchestra (1973)
- Amen, Op. 35, chorus a cappella (1975)
- Symphony No. 3 'Symphony of Sorrowful Songs', Op. 36, soprano and orchestra (1976)
- Three little pieces, Op. 37, violin, piano (1977)
- Beatus Vir Psalm Op. 38, chorus and orchestra (1979)
- Szeroka Woda (Broad Waters), Op. 39, chorus a cappella (1979)
  - No. 1 A ta nasza Narew – O our Narew River
  - No. 2 Oj, kiedy na Powiślu – Oh, When in Powiśle
  - No. 3 Oj, Janie, Janie – Oh, Johnny, Johnny
  - No. 4 Polne róże rwała – She was Picking Wild Roses
  - No. 5 Szeroka woda – Broad Waters
- Harpsichord/Piano Concerto, Op. 40, harpsichord/piano and orchestra (1980)
- Mazurkas for piano, Op. 41
- Two Songs, Op. 42
  - No. 1 Nokturn – Nocturne
  - No. 2 Malaguena
- Blessed Raspberry Songs, Op. 43, voice and piano (1980)
  - No. 1 Błogosławione pieśni malinowe – Blessed Raspberry Songs
  - No. 2 Co ranek, skoro ustępują cienie – Each Morning, when the Shadows Recede
  - No. 3 Litość – Compassion
  - No. 4 O! Boże . . . jeden, który JESTEŚ – Oh, God...the One who IS"
- Miserere, Op. 44, chorus a cappella (1981)
- "Wieczór ciemny się uniża" for a cappella choir, Op. 45 (1981)
  - No. 1 Pytają się ludzie – People are Asking
  - No. 2 Uwiją, wianuczki – They will Make Little Garlands
  - No. 3 Ścięli dąbek – They Felled the Little Oak Tree
  - No. 4 Depce konik – The little Horse Paws the Ground
  - No. 5 Wieczór ciemny się uniż a – Dark Evening is Falling
- My Vistula, grey Vistula, Op. 46, chorus a cappella (1981)
- Lullabies and Dances for violin and piano, Op. 47 (1982)
- Songs to Words by J. Słowacki, Op. 48 (1983)
  - No. 1 We łzach, Panie, ręce podnosimy do Ciebie – In Tears, Lord, We Raise our Hands to You
  - No. 2 Panie! O którym na niebosach słyszę – Lord! Of Whom in the Heavens I Hear
- Three Lullabies, Op. 49, Mixed Voices (1984)
  - No. 1 Uśnijże mi, uśnij – Sleep for Me, Sleep
  - No. 2 Kołysz-że się kołysz – Rock, Rock
  - No. 3 Nie piej, kurku, nie piej – Don't Crow, Rooster, Don't Crow
- "Ach, mój wianku lewandowy, for a cappella choir, Op. 50
  - No. 1 Ach, mój wianku lewandowy – O, My Garland of Lavender
  - No. 2 Wędrowali trzy panienki – Three Lasses were Wandering
  - No. 3 Taiłam się – I have Kept Silent
  - No. 4 Bzi, bzi, bzibziana –
  - No. 5 Chcecie wiedzieć – Do You Want to Know
  - No. 6 Po cożeś mę, matuleńku, za mąż wydała – Why did You Marry Me off, Mummy
  - No. 7 Dajże, Boże, plonowało – Give Us, God, Good Harvest]
- "Idzie chmura, pada deszcz" for a cappella choir, Op. 51
  - No. 1 Idzie chmura, pada deszcz – The Cloud Comes, Rain Falls
  - No. 2 Gdzie to jedziesz, Jaszu? – Where are You Going, Johnny?
  - No. 3 Kiedy będzie słońce i pogoda – When It Will be Sunny and Warm
  - No. 4 Szła sierotka po wsi – An Orphan Girl Walked through a Village
  - No. 5 Czas nam do domu, dziewczyno – Time for Us to Go Home, Girl
- Sundry Pieces for piano, Op. 52 (1956–1961)
- Lerchenmusik, Op. 53, clarinet, cello and piano (1986)
- Five Marian Songs, Op. 54, chorus a cappella (1985)
  - No. 1 Matko niebieskiego Pana – Mother of the Heavenly Lord
  - No. 2 Matko Najświętsza! – Most Holy Mother!
  - No. 3 Zdrowaś bądź Maria! – Hail Mary!
  - No. 4 Ach, jak smutna jest rozstanie – Oh, How Sad is the Parting
  - No. 5 Ciebie na wieki wychalać będziemy – We Shall Praise You Forever
- Two Marian Hymns, solo voices a cappella, no Op. number (1986)
- "O Domina Nostra", Op. 55, soprano and organ (1985)
- "Pod Twoją obronę", Op. 56, a cappella choir (1984)
- Na Aniol Panski, Op. 57, chorus a cappella (1986)
- For You, Anne-Lill, Op. 58, flute and piano (1986)
- Aria, Op. 59, tuba, piano, tam-tam and bass drum (1987)
- Totus Tuus, Op. 60 (1987)
- "Przybądź Duchu Święty", a cappella choir, Op. 61 (1988)
- Already it is Dusk, Op. 62, string quartet (1988)
- Good Night, Op. 63, soprano, alto flute, piano, three tam-tams (1990)
- Intermezzo, piano (1990, no Op. number)
- Quasi una fantasia, Op. 64, string quartet (1991)
- Concerto-Cantata, flute and orchestra, Op. 65 (1992)
- Kleines Requiem für eine Polka, Op. 66, piano and 13 instruments (1993)
- ...songs are sung, Op. 67, string quartet (1995/2005)
- Three Songs of Maria Konopnicka, Op. 68, voice and piano (1954/95)
- Three Fragments to Words by Stanisław Wyspiański, Op. 69, voice and piano (1995–1996)
  - No. 1 Jakżeż ja się uspokoję – How on Earth Can I Be at Peace
  - No. 2 Może z mętów się dobędzie człowieka – Perhaps from these Dregs a Man Will Emerge
  - No. 3 Poezjo! – tyś to jest spolojną siestą – Poetry! – You are a Calm Siesta
- Valentine piece, Op. 70, flute and bell (1996)
- Sanctus Adalbertus, Op. 71, for soprano, baritone, mixed choir, and symphony orchestra (World Premier Nov. 4, 2015, Krakow)
- Salve, Sidus Polonorum, Op. 72, for chorus and ensemble (1997-2000)
- Little Fantasia, Op. 73, violin and piano (1997)
- "Sławny w Męczenników Gronie", Op. 74, for mixed choir (1999)
- Five Kurpian Songs, Op. 75, chorus a cappella (1999)
- Lobgesang, Op. 76, chorus a cappella (2000)
- "Niech Nam Żyją i Śpiewają", chorus a cappella, Op. 77 (2000)
- Quasi una fantasia, Op. 78, string orchestra version of Op. 64 (2002)
- Dla Jasiunia, Op. 79, violin and piano (2003)
- "Po co żeś tu przyszło Siwa Mgło", Op. 80, short pieces for two groups of violins (2003)
- The Song of Rodziny Katynskie, Op. 81, chorus a cappella (2004)
- Two Tristan Postludes and Chorale, Op. 82, orchestra (2004)
- Kyrie, Op. 83
- Selected Sacred Songs, for Unaccompanied Mixed Choir, Op. 84 (1986, pub. 2013)
  - No. 1 Zdrowaś Bądź Maryja
  - No. 2 Idźmy, Tulmy Się Jak Dziatki
  - No. 3 Szczęśliwy, Kto Sobie Patrona
  - No. 4 Ludu, Mój Ludu
  - No. 5 Witaj Pani, Matko Matki
  - No. 6 Zawitaj Pani Świata
  - No. 7 Bądź Pozdrowiony
  - No. 8 Jezu Chryste, Panie Miły
  - No. 9 O Matko Miłościwa
  - No. 10 Pozdrawiajmy, Wychwalajmy
  - No. 11 Święty, Święty, Święty
  - No. 12 Tysiąckroć Bądź Pozdrowiona
  - No. 13 Krzyknijmy Wszyscy
  - No. 14 Wstał Pan Chrystus z Martwych
  - No. 15 Śliczny Jezu, Miły Panie
  - No. 16 Twoja Cześć, Chwała
  - No. 17 Ojcze Boże Wszechmogący
  - No. 18 Krzyżu Chrystusa
  - No. 19 Ciebie Wzywamy, Ciebie Błagamy (No date given)
  - No. 20 Witaj Jutrzenko (No date given)
- Symphony No. 4 "Tansman Episodes", Op. 85 (2006–2009), completed by the composer's son Mikołaj Górecki

=== Unpublished ===
Górecki's unpublished works prior to 1956 include: Legenda for orchestra, five mazurkas for piano, a prelude for violin and piano, ten preludes for piano, two songs ("Przez te łąki. przez te pola" and "Kiedy Polska"), a Terzetto quasi una fantasia for oboe, violin and piano, a romance for piano, a string quartet, Obratzki poetyckie for piano and a piano concerto. These do not have opus numbers.

One scholar assigns Op. number 9a to a suite for piano titled "Z ptasiego gniazda" ("From the Bird's Nest") which Górecki wrote November 1956. Earlier that year, Górecki set to music a translation to Polish of one of Federico García Lorca's poems by Mikołaj Bieszczadowski, but Górecki revised it in 1980 and it was published with another translated Lorca poem as the two songs of Op. 42.

== Sources ==
- Thomas, Adrian. 1997. Górecki. Oxford Studies of Composers. Oxford: Clarendon Press; New York: Oxford University Press. ISBN 0-19-816393-2
