= Three Dances (Górecki) =

1973 suite by Henryk Górecki

- by Henryk Górecki
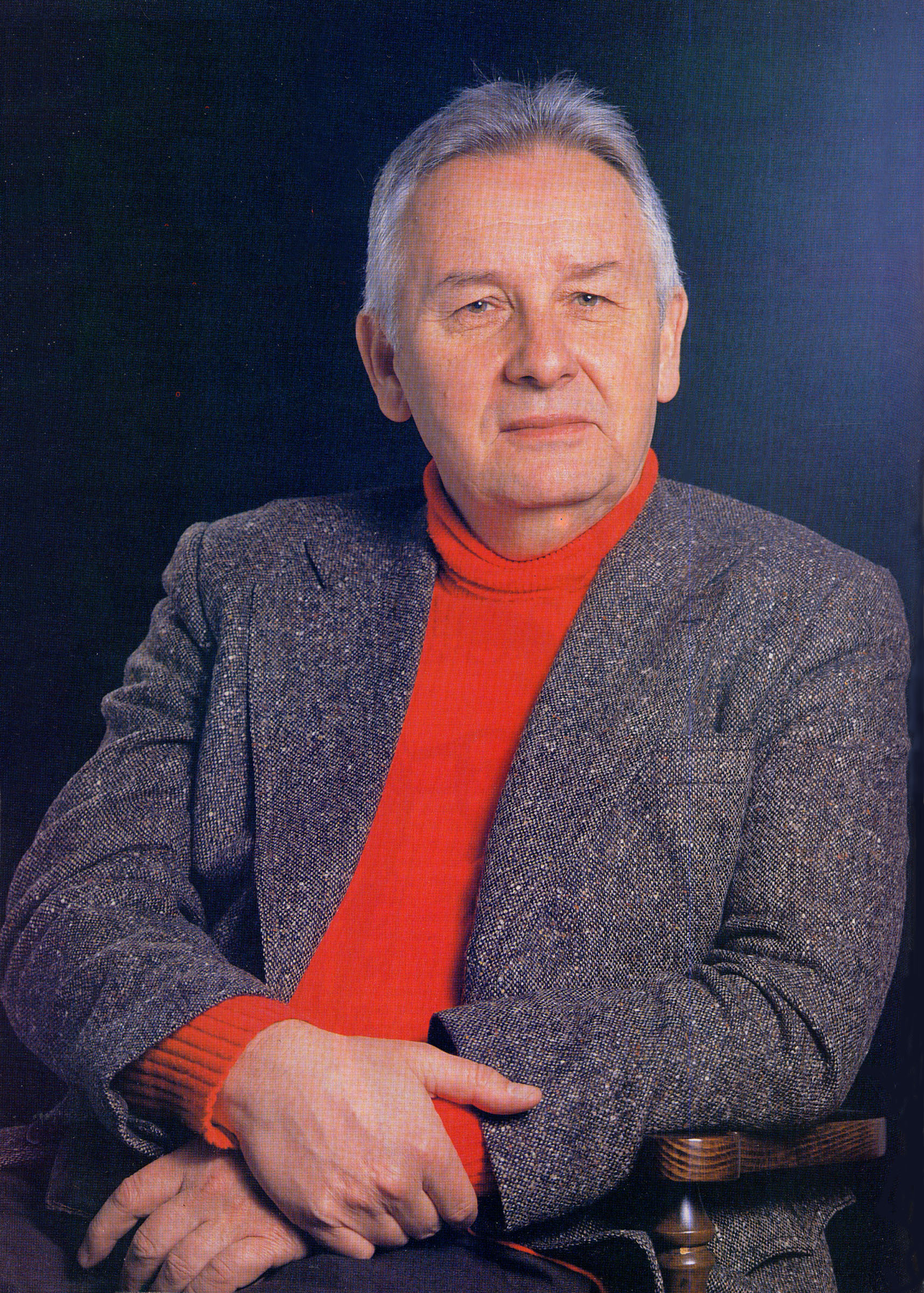
- Górecki in 1993
- Native name: Trzy tańce
- Opus: 34
- Period: New Polish School
- Genre: Suite
- Composed: 1973
- Dedication: Antoni Szafranek and Rybnik Philharmonic Orchestra
- Published: 1983
- Publisher: PWM Edition
- Duration: 12–14 minutes
- Movements: 3
- Scoring: Symphony Orchestra

Premiere
- Date: 24 November 1973
- Location: Rybnik, Polish People's Republic
- Conductor: Antoni Szafranek
- Performers: Rybnik Philharmonic Orchestra

Three Dances (Trzy tańce in Polish) is a three-movement orchestral suite written by Henryk Górecki in 1973, dedicated to his mentor Antoni Szafranek and the Rybnik Philharmonic Orchestra, both of which premiered the piece on 24 November 1973. The suite is characterized by its folkish style, with abundant use of sharpened fourths, ostinati and juxtapositions of duple and triple metre. It has been positively received by critics and reviewers.

== Background ==
Between 1948 and 1956, Polish music followed the principles of socialist realism as delineated by the Soviet Composers' Conference in Moscow in January 1948. Under this direction, music had to be simple and accessible to the masses, be tonal and take after local folk music. Any composer or piece that deviated from that model, that attempted to create a new language or that experimented in terms of sound, harmony and form, were accused of being "formalist". Compositions branded as such vanished from the concert programmes and radio. Polish musicologist Zofia Helman explains:

According to the principles of the style called socialist realism, the content was supposed to be the fundamental expression of a musical work. Thus, forms that were closely connected to text were moved into the foreground: operas, cantatas, and especially songs for the masses. The music that realised the new content was supposed to be emotional, mobilising, optimistic, and "ideologically active".

However, by 1954, many young composers were writing experimental pieces that openly defied socialist realism. The Polish party leadership attempted to stop the aesthetic changes by commissioning mass songs for the Second Party Congress in March 1954, which attracted little interest, as well as commissioning concert pieces to celebrate the tenth anniversary of People's Poland. A successor to the 1951 Festival of Polish music was also organized in 1955, which was considered a failure. The Warsaw Autumn music festival was then established in 1956, motivated by a desire of composers to end the isolation and provincial nature of Polish music written up to that point. These changes mirroed the events of the Polish October, which led to the end of Stalinism under the new rule of Władysław Gomułka, followed by a temporary political, economic and cultural liberalization.

Between 1955 and 1969, Górecki studied and assimilated the music of previous composers like Béla Bartók and Karol Szymanowski, as well as contemporary ones such as Pierre Boulez, Iannis Xenakis and Luigi Nono, among others. Alongside other composers like Krzysztof Penderecki and Witold Lutosławski, Górecki was at the forefront of the New Polish School, exemplified by sonorism. Górecki's career was closely associated with the Warsaw Autumn Festival, and it served to launch him into the international scene. His "Epitaph" was performed in the 1958 edition, followed by his Symphony No. 1 in 1959 (later awarded a prize at the 1961 Paris Youth Bienniale) and "Scontri", which was a success at the 1960 edition. His style was described as avant-garde, influenced by post-Webernian serialism.

With his "3 Pieces in the Old Style" (1963) Górecki's style began to change influenced by Polish medieval music and modality. His music went through a simplification process of harmony and texture, moving towards melody and consonance This change was consolidated with "Ad Matrem", Op. 29 (1971), which won first prize at the International Rostrum of Composers in Paris. Górecki increasingly employed vocal-like lyricism, repetitive rhythmic cells, colour and expression over modernist techniques and sonic experimentation. His ultimately rejection of the serialism and sonorism of his first style alienated Górecki from western critics, and although various Polish agencies continued to commission works from him, Górecki ceased to be viewed as an important composer in the Free West. In 1987 Górecki signed a contract with publishing house Boosey & Hawkes, which led to a resurgence of the composer in the West through performances and articles.

== Composition ==
Three Dances was composed between June and July 1973, being the only work he completed that year due to poor health. The piece was dedicated to Polish violinist, composer, conductor and teacher Antoni Szafranek, as well as the Rybnik Philharmonic Orchestra. Alongside with his brother Karol Szafranek, Antoni was a key figure of the Szafrankowie Brothers State School of Music in Rybnik, where Gorecki had his first formal musical studies between 1952 and 1955. Górecki also played the violin in the Philharmonic Orchestra, and between 1955 and 1960 he became a composition student of Szabelski at the State Higher School of Music in Katowice. This piece can thus be seen as Górecki's affectionate tribute to his mentor.

The suite was premiered in Rybnik on 24 November 1973, performed by the Rybnik Philharmonic Orchestra conducted by Antoni Szafranek. It was published by the PWM Edition in 1983, which holds the rights in the countries of the former socialist copyright federation. (Note: Polish People's Republic, People's Socialist Republic of Albania, People's Republic of Bulgaria, People's Republic of China, Czechoslovak Socialist Republic, Socialist Federal Republic of Yugoslavia, Republic of Cuba, Democratic People's Republic of Korea, Socialist Republic of Vietnam, Socialist Republic of Romania, Hungarian People's Republic and the Union of Soviet Socialist Republics) In 1997, copyright was transferred to Chester Music, a subgroup within Wise Music Group. The score also has been published by Boosey & Hawkes. Górecki biographer Adrian Thomas points at the second movement of "Three pieces in the old style" as a precedent for "Three Dances" and remarked "stylistically these dances look back to Polish music composed in the late 1940s and early 1950s." Paul Corfield Godfrey instead places the piece in the context of central European folk-dance arrangements, with influences of Béla Bartók, Zoltán Kodály and Leoš Janáček.

== Instrumentation ==
The work is scored for symphony orchestra.

Woodwinds

2 flutes (also doubling piccolos)
2 oboes
2 clarinets
2 bassoons

Brass

3 trumpets
4 horns
3 trombones
tubas

Strings

Violins I
Violins II
Violas
Violoncellos
Double basses

Percussion

4 timpani

== Form ==
External audio
- Performed by the Warsaw Philharmonic Orchestra under Antoni Wit
- I. Presto, marcatissimo
- II. Andante cantabile
- III. Presto – Marcatissimo

The piece is divided in three contrasting movements of folkish inflection, with abundant use of sharpened fourths, ostinati and juxtapositions of duple and triple meter. Górecki specified a total duration of 12 minutes for the piece; 2:50 for the first movement, 4 for the second and 5 for the third.

1. Presto, marcatissimo (𝅗𝅥 = 72–76 or 𝅘𝅥 = 216–228)
2. Andante cantabile (𝅘𝅥 = 66–69)
3. Presto (𝅘𝅥 = 184) – Marcatissimo

=== I. Presto, marcatissimo ===
The first movement is structured in ternary form (A–B–A'). It opens with fortissimo ostinato figures in triple meter rhythm, over which violins present a theme in form of a simple melody centred around E as the tonal centre. This material, alongside the ostinati figures, is constantly repeated with slight variations. The central section introduces a folkish, march-like theme on the horns, while constantly switching between duple and triple meter. The first part is then recapitulated, with the main melody on clarinets, bassoons and violins while the tonal centre moves from E to C. When it seems the second section is going to be recapitulated as well, but this time in fortississimo, the presto ends with a sudden chord.

=== II. Andante cantabile ===
The second movement is scored for solo strings, written in form of an arch. It begins with a theme based on a long-drawn melody, which is exposed in piano by first violins over a duple meter rhythm, which leads to a fortissimo central climax. Then the music returns to the opening melody. The andante ends with the underlying ostinato contrasted against sustained chords on first violins.

=== III. Presto – Marcatissimo ===
The third movement opens with a two-note ostinato on cellos and basses, over which the solo bassoon presents a modal-inflected main theme in mezzo piano, which is then taken by clarinet over a bassoon pedal note. This dynamic of a higher woodwind instrument taking the melody while the previous one provides support continues with oboe and piccolo. After a general pause, divided strings take the ostinato while woodwinds have the melody.

After another general pause, the second section opens with fortissimo C major triad chords, followed by a second theme on first violins. A brief transition, comprised purely by repeating ostinati, leads to a return to the main section material on strings, horns and bassoon. Then a fortississimo climax is reached on full orchestra, followed by a repeat of the ostinato transition on strings and brass. For the final time, the main material returns in full orchestra but in fortissississimo (fffff). The piece then ends with a triumphal E major triad that is hammered down with what James Harley describes as "Beethovenian finality", with the addition of a dissonant major seventh on the final chord.

== Assessment ==
The piece has receive positive assessment in reviews. Music critic Richard Whitehouse described the piece as "one of Górecki's most immediate and approachable pieces: a suite of highly contrasting dances that makes virtuoso use of a large orchestra and is the nearest in spirit that the composer came to the folk-inflected directness of his older contemporary Wojciech Kilar. That such a piece has not achieved greater popularity is the more surprising."

Kelsey Walsh drew comparisons between the piece and Stravinsky's The Rite of Spring in the first and third movements, while the second brought him to mind Górecki's own third String Quartet "...songs are sung", Op. 67, written much latter between 1995 and 2005. He also more generally described the suite as "quite fun, and I'm surprised [...] it hasn't had more widespread acceptance, given its highly accessible style."

James Harley described it as "simply scored, and clearly structured, but it is not an uncharacteristic work". On the other hand, William Hedley portrayed the work as uncharacteristic of Górecki: "I don’t think many listeners [...] would readily identify the composer from the Three Dances, though once the name had been dropped many might well give out a knowing 'Of course!'"

Allen Gimbel in American Record Guide also praised the piece with positive comments: "The Three Dances (1973) are pulsating and obsessive chunks of Polish peasant stuff, the beautiful middle movement showing an early resemblance to the figuration in the last movement of the famous Third Symphony. It would make a terrific substitute for the 19th-century folk music rhapsodies heard so often closing orchestra concerts."

== Recordings ==
Conductor	Orchestra	Recording Date	Formats	Labels	Catalogue ID	References
Mirosław Jacek Błaszczyk	Silesian Philharmonic Orchestra	Recorded and released in 2009	CD / Digital	Dux Records	DUX 0732	
Antoni Wit	Warsaw Philharmonic Orchestra	2011, released in 2012	CD / Digital	Naxos Records	8.572872	
