= Op. 30 =

In music, Op. 30 stands for Opus number 30. Compositions that are assigned this number include:

- Beethoven – Violin Sonata No. 6
- Beethoven – Violin Sonata No. 7
- Beethoven – Violin Sonata No. 8
- Boccherini – Musica notturna delle strade di Madrid
- Braunfels – Die Vögel
- Chopin – Mazurkas, Op. 30
- Coleridge-Taylor – The Song of Hiawatha
- Enescu – Piano Quartet No. 2
- Farrenc – Piano Quintet No. 1
- Górecki – Two Sacred Songs, Op. 30
- Hanson – Symphony No. 2
- Mendelssohn - Songs without Words, Book II
- Myaskovsky – Symphony No. 10
- Rachmaninoff – Piano Concerto No. 3
- Reizenstein – Anna Kraus
- Rimsky-Korsakov – Piano Concerto
- Saint-Saëns – La princesse jaune
- Schumann – 3 Gedichte
- Scriabin – Piano Sonata No. 4
- Sibelius – The Breaking of the Ice on the Oulu River (Islossningen i Uleå älv), melodrama for narrator, male choir, and orchestra (1899)
- Strauss – Also sprach Zarathustra
- Tchaikovsky – String Quartet No. 3
