= Harpsichord Concerto (Górecki) =

Henryk Górecki's Harpsichord Concerto

Concerto for Harpsichord (or Piano) and String Orchestra
- Concerto by Henryk Górecki
- Opus: 40
- Year: 1980
- Period: Contemporary music
- Performed: March 2, 1980: Amsterdam
- Published: 1982
- Publisher: PWM Edition; Chester Music
- Duration: 9 minutes
- Movements: 2
- Scoring: Harpsichord and String Orchestra; Piano and String Orchestra

Henryk Górecki's Harpsichord Concerto, Op. 40, sometimes also entitled Concerto for Harpsichord (or Piano) and String Orchestra, is a concerto written for the harpsichord by the Polish composer in 1980.

== Background ==
The piece was commissioned in 1980 by Andrzej Chłopecki, head of the Polish Radio Music Station, as part of the Composers Forum, a radio series featuring contemporary Polish composers, during a period when Górecki was exploring pure instrumental music after dedicating over a decade to vocal and choral works. The concerto was written for Elżbieta Chojnacka, an outstanding harpsichordist who was an expert in contemporary music for the harpsichord. The premiere performance of the concerto took place in Katowice on March 2, 1980, with Chojnacka on the harpsichord and the Polish Radio and Television Symphony Orchestra with conductor Stanisław Wisłocki accompanying her. The work is dedicated to Chojnacka. The piano version premiered ten years later on April 22, 1990, during the Poznań Music Spring with Jarosław Siwiński as the pianist and the Poznań Academy of Music Symphony Orchestra conducted by Marcin Sompoliński. It was initially published in 1982 by PWM Edition and republished in 1997 by Chester Music.

== Structure ==
This concerto is divided into two movements and has a total duration of 9 minutes. The piece is scored for a harpsichord solo (amplified electrically) and an orchestra consisting of 6 first violins, 6 second violins, 4 violas, 4 cellos, and 2 double basses. Additionally, Górecki wrote a piano version of the concerto, which is scored for 16 first violins, 14 second violins, 12 violas, 10 cellos, and 8 double basses. Both the harpsichord and the piano version of the concerto are still popular today, with the original harpsichord version being the most sought after. The movement list is as follows:

1. Allegro molto
2. Vivace

The first movement creates a spinning, organ-like sound with clashes between the harpsichord and strings, producing a powerful, demonic, and foreboding wall of sound. The movement ends with open chords. The second movement begins with a more open tonality, but harsh dissonances soon cover the ensemble. The energetic nature of this movement creates a buoyancy, and the concerto's reductionist style, with its consistent textures, ostinatos, harmonic movement, and persistent motor rhythms, is evident. The subtlety shifting rhythms add to the concerto's intensity, and within 9 minutes Górecki creates a powerful explosion in his musical output. The harpsichord's vigorous timbre is complemented by the chordal texture of the strings, and Górecki's use of dissonance adds color to the subtle changes in repetitive rhythmic structures. The highlander music of the southern Podhale region sets the mood for both movements. Although the Concerto incorporates certain aspects of Polish highlanders' music, it is also a part of Górecki's "reductionist" music sequence, which began with Refrain (1965) and is characterized by a desire for economy of scoring and structure.

The Harpsichord Concerto is unique among Górecki's works, as it stands out from his other compositions with its driving motor rhythms and vigorously dynamic playing from the soloist. It comes after the Symphony No. 3 (1976) and Beatus Vir (1979), both of which are lengthy compositions with a contemplative, sacred tone. Following the concerto is Blessed Raspberry Songs, a piece inspired by Norwid (1980), and Miserere (1981), a grand composition for a large mixed choir a cappella. These surrounding works have a sacred vein running through them and are contemplative in mood, while the Harpsichord Concerto is quite the opposite.

== Reception ==
Critics at the time were not quite sure what to make of the concerto, and Górecki himself described it as a "prank" – a work that is not too serious and has fun while also displaying some of his personality onto the score. Musicologist Teresa Malecka described the piece as "short, neat, instrumentally impressive. One feels tempted to say that this is a piece of light music, pleasant to listen to and, to my mind, satisfying to play. Given Górecki’s music of recent years, this work makes one surprised and shy. After his Symphonies No. 2 and 3, after ‘Beatus Vir,’ those greatest and most significant works of Polish music, here comes this striking trinket." Along the same lines, Małgorzata Gąsiorowska stated that: "Totally enamoured as I am with Górecki's 'Symphony No. 3', I cannot help sharing a concern that has nagged me during all performances of his 'Concerto': what does this music bring?."
