= Polish School (music) =

The Polish School (also known as New Polish School) is the music of several post-1945 Polish composers who share generational and stylistic similarities. Representatives include Tadeusz Baird, Henryk Górecki, Wojciech Kilar, Witold Lutosławski, Krzysztof Penderecki, Grażyna Bacewicz, and Kazimierz Serocki. According to Polish music scholar Adrian Thomas, Zygmunt Mycielski used the term at the Łagów conference in 1949, and it was later used at the 1956 Warsaw Autumn festival. Their common purpose was in part retrospective, reacting to socialist realism, and in part speculative. Sound mass and sonorism influenced these post-war composers.

== See also ==
- Music of Poland

== Bibliography ==
- Pollack, Howard (1999). Aaron Copland: The Life and Work of an Uncommon Man. Henry Holt and Company
- Rappoport-Gelfand, Lidia (1991). Musical Life in Poland: The Postwar Years, 1945-1977. Gordon and Breach
- Thomas, Adrian (2005). Polish Music Since Szymanowski. Cambridge University Press
