= String Quartet No. 1 (Górecki) =

1988 composition by Henryk Górecki

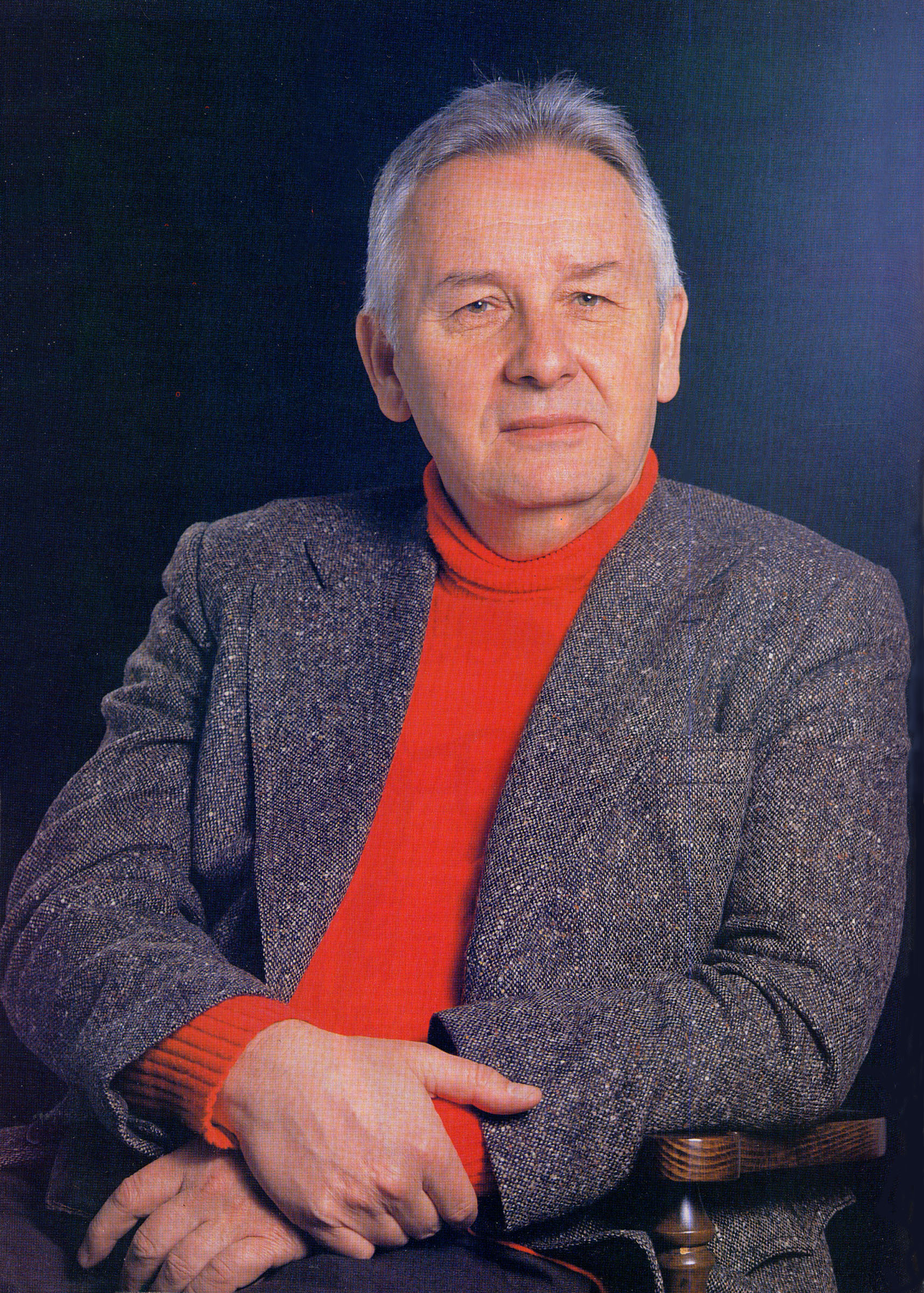
Henryk Górecki in 1993

String Quartet No. 1, "Already it is dusk", Op. 62, is a composition for string quartet by Henryk Górecki. Written in 1988 after a long period of focus on vocal music, it was first performed by the Kronos Quartet on 21 January 1989 at the Walker Art Center in Minneapolis. All three of Górecki's string quartets were written for the Kronos Quartet. It is published by Boosey & Hawkes and PWM Edition.

The piece reflects the composer's interest in early music, deriving both its title and main theme from a motet by 16th-century Polish Renaissance composer and poet, Wacław of Szamotuły, written to the words of Andrzej Trzecieski (c. 1530–1584). Górecki had already quoted this piece in at least two earlier compositions, Chorale in the Form of a Canon (1961), and Old Polish Music, Op. 24 (1967–1969).

Already it is dusk, the night is near,
let us ask the Lord for His help
to protect us from evil,
to guard us from those who use darkness for their wrong-doings.

The choice of quotation was partially inspired by Górecki's dislike of the evenings in a time of political uncertainty in Communist Poland. Furthermore, the central section of the work recalls music which Polish Highlander musicians would play until the late night. In typical Góreckian fashion, the piece is loaded with symbolism. This is not the first string quartet to make references to this musical tradition, having been done before most notably by Karol Szymanowski and Stanisław Moniuszko. Górecki even remarked once: "Where Szymanowski went, I went too."

The quartet is cast in one movement and lasts around 15 minutes. The Boosey & Hawkes edition includes the lyrics to the original motet and a notation of the tenor line, which appears in the work.

== Origins ==
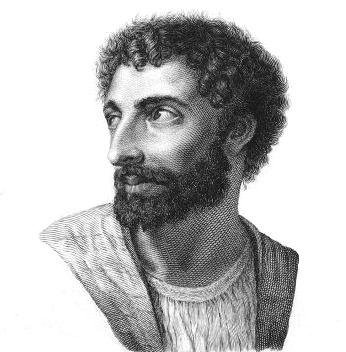
Wacław of Szamotuły

Henryk Górecki's interest in early music can be traced to his earliest compositions in his avant-garde period. The composer frequently employed the use of musical quotation in his compositions. As early as in the First Symphony, Op. 14, from 1959, a highly avant-garde serialist work, Górecki used the Bogurodzica, the oldest Polish notated hymn, in one of the movements. Similarly, the Old Polish Music Op. 24 from 1969 is based on a theme from a 14th century Polish organum Benedicamus Domino and on 16th-century composer Wacław of Szamotuły's "Already it is dusk", or "Już się zmierzcha" in the original Polish.

Around the 1970s, Górecki's musical language began to change to a more consonant and tonal one, with the Second Symphony Op. 31 marking an important transition point. Even here, Górecki used a musical quotation, from the anonymous 15th-century song Laude digna prole. After the Third Symphony Op. 36 (also heavily based on quotations of Polish religious and folk music, and of Chopin), and a censorship (including losing his job as rector at the Karol Szymanowski Academy of Music in Katowice) following the composition of Beatus Vir Op. 38 in 1979, for defying the anti-religious policies of the communist Polish Government, Górecki began to move much more into vocal music in the 1980s.

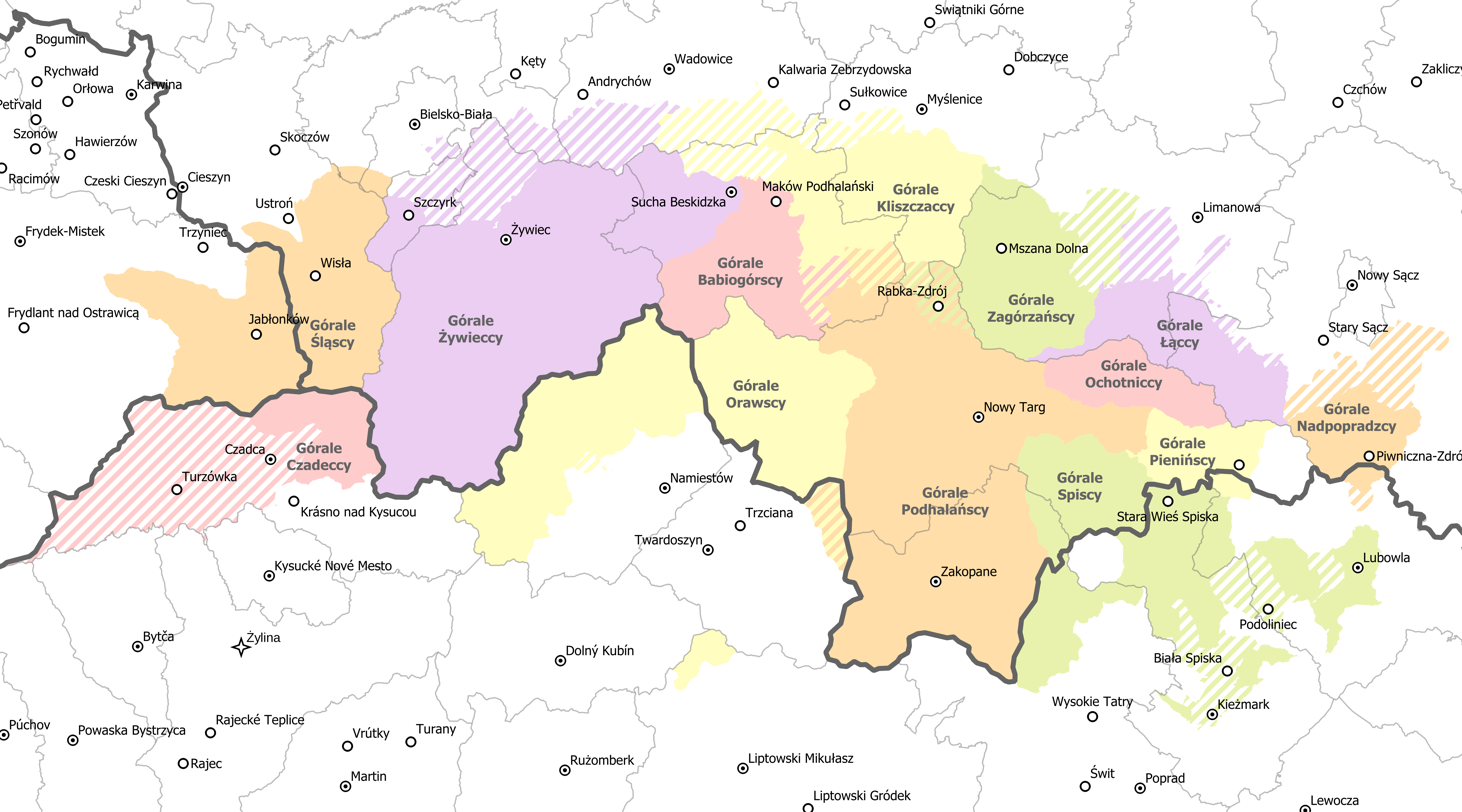
Map of areas inhabited by the Gorals

Górecki also had a lifelong fascination with the integration of folk music into his voice. He admired especially the works of Bartók and Szymanowski, the latter of whom spent his last years in Zakopane in Southern Poland and devoted his time towards studying the music of the region, integrating it into his music – most notably in the ballet Harnasie (1923–1931). (Górecki would even come to include a quote from Szymanowski's First Quartet in his Third String Quartet, premiered in 2005.) Górecki would make frequent visits to this region, and would sometimes come to play the fiddle with the local musicians, coming to call it his "spiritual home".

The First String Quartet was commissioned by Doris and Myron Beigler and the Lincoln Center for the Performing Arts for the Kronos Quartet, and marked a revival in Górecki's interest in purely instrumental and chamber music. He composed the piece between 20 October and 30 November 1988, in the Highlander town of Chochołów and in his hometown of Katowice, and it marked a new synthesis of his style – drawing wide influences from avant-garde, folk music, and early music. Similarly to two earlier compositions, it is based on Already it is dusk, which is a popular motet sung by many choirs in Poland, praying for help against evil forces as the night falls. The English translation is slightly misleading, as it implies that dusk already has fallen, while the Polish original refers to an ongoing process – therefore, a better one would perhaps be "Already dusk is falling". This quotation was most likely informed by the composer's dislike of the night, partially relating to his disdain for the Polish Communist authorities.

== Structure ==
The piece is notated without a key nor a time signature, and the length of bars is irregular. It is only one movement, although strongly divided into sections, and includes the following tempo markings, which, typical for Górecki's scores, include highly descriptive instructions in Italian:

- Deciso – Marcatissimo (bar 1)
- Molto lento – Tranquillo (bar 6)
- Deciso – Marcatissimo (bar 20)
- Molto lento – Tranquillo (bar 28)
- Deciso – Marcatissimo (bar 52)
- Molto lento (pochiss. più come prima) – Tranquillo (bar 62)
- Deciso – Marcatissimo (bar 96)
- Molto lento (ancora più come prima) – Tranquillissimo (bar 116)
- Allegro Deciso – Energico, molto espressivo e molto marcato ma sempre ben tenuto (bar 125)
- Feroce – Marcatissimo (bar 161)
- Grindendo (bar 163)
- Ferocissimo – Furioso – Marcatissimo (bar 215)
- Molto Furioso – Marcatissimo ma anche molto deciso e molto espressivo (bar 225)
- Martellando – Tempestoso (bar 265)
- Molto Furioso (bar 324)
- Molto lento – Tranquillissimo (bar 351)
- Largo (bar 388)

It ends with a fermata lunga on a rest in bar 395.

== Analysis ==
Cantus firmus and tenor line in Wacław of Szamotuły's piece

After a brief introduction on an open fifth composed of the open D and A strings on a violin or viola, which will come to be a central point of return of the work, the piece starts off with a canon on the cantus firmus of the Renaissance motet, with a different transformation of the theme in each instrument:

- First entry: 2 violin, retrograde on F
- Second entry: cello, retrograde inversion on G
- Third entry: 1 violin, inversion on F♯
- Fourth entry: viola, on G♯ (marked poco en dehors in score)

This recalls twelve-tone techniques, which Górecki used extensively in his early avant-garde period. The canon is interrupted by the whole quartet playing dissonant chords, built from chromatically stacked fifths, alternating with unison perfect fifths on D. These two sections are then repeated a few times, growing longer and more intense each time, until the piece transitions into a new "folk" section.

This section recalls the music of the Polish Highlanders and explores irregular rhythmic divisions, and, typical for the composer, repetition. It begins with the violins playing a simple dissonant ostinato accompaniment, while the viola and cello play a new theme in rhythmic unison, a major ninth apart from each other. Eventually, the cello and viola take over the accompaniment, and the violins take over the theme, now playing it a major third apart. The instruments end up switching roles one final time, with the viola and cello now playing a manipulated version of the original cantus firmus. This texture, with a very clear division between melody and ostinato accompaniment within a string section can be found in Highlander music, as well as the string quartets of Bartók.

A new, highly rhythmic Martellando-Tempestoso section then enters, with all instruments playing chords in rhythmic unison and closed voicing, achieved partially through double-stops, which is also a distant allusion to Highlander music. The harmony switches rapidly between consonance and dissonance as the chords move in contrary motion. This kind of texture can be seen in other works inspired by the Polish Highlands, such as Wojciech Kilar's poem for string orchestra Orawa, composed only two years earlier, in 1986. Here Górecki also includes the performance instruction non risparmiare l'arco, meaning "do not spare the bow" in Italian, suggesting a harsh and uncompromising playing style. After a climax, the canon theme from the beginning returns, and the piece concludes with a tranquil coda, marked Armonia in the score.

== See also ==
- Henryk Górecki: String Quartets Nos. 1 and 2
- Henryk Mikolaj Górecki: Already It Is Dusk/"Lerchenmusik"
