= Totus Tuus (Górecki) =

1987 choir piece

Score from the work

Totus Tuus, Op. 60 (English: Totally Yours) was written for unaccompanied mixed choir by the Polish composer Henryk Górecki in 1987. Górecki composed the piece to celebrate Pope John Paul II's third pilgrimage to his native Poland that summer, and the work remains his best-known, if not critically acclaimed, a cappella choral piece of the 1980s. Indeed, Totus Tuus has been described as a contemporary classic (Wordsworth 2013, p. 49).

The work was performed twice during the pilgrimage: first at its beginning on June 8, 1987 at the Chopin Airport in Warsaw and later on June 14, 1987 at a High Mass held in Victory Square, Warsaw by the Choir of the Warsaw Academy of Catholic Theology.

== Description ==
The libretto was taken from a poem written by contemporary writer Maria Boguslawska, which addresses the Virgin Mary, the patron saint of Poland. Totus Tuus's form is ABA'CD, and marks a return to the simple homophony characteristic of Górecki's earlier Marian Songs. The composition's texture utilises homophony to allow for a clear voice for the libretto, while the simple chant form is repeated to slowly build a musical affirmation of faith. Gorecki used a homophonic texture in other Marian compositions, such as 1985's Marian Songs, Op. 54, and Under your Protection, Op. 56. This simplification of texture also occurs in Gorecki's most famous work, Symphony No. 3, where a similarly simple, diatonic language is employed to evoke the sparse and repetitive mood of Holy minimalism.

== Analysis ==
William Helmcke argues that the devoutly Catholic Górecki derived the main motives in Totus Tuus from Poland's oldest hymn, Bogurodzica (Helmcke 2014, 136). These motives are a descending perfect fourth (from notes 3-6 of Bogurodzica); the vertical presentation of that fourth, which explains the numerous second inversion chords; incomplete neighbour (from notes 1-2 of Bogurodzica]; complete neighbour (from notes 5-7 of Bogurodzica); and voice exchange, which functions as Augenmusik (Ibid, 137).

== Performances ==
=== France ===
- Aix-en-Provence choir Opus 13 performed the score in three concerts in 2011.
- Performed at the reopening ceremony of the Cathedral of Notre-Dame de Paris on December 7, 2024, on the opening of the cathedral doors.

=== United States ===
- The Royal School of Church Music St. Louis summer course performed Totus Tuus in July 2005 at the Cathedral Basilica of St. Louis.
- The New Mexico Symphonic Chorus performed Totus Tuus at St. John's Cathedral in Albuquerque, New Mexico, in April 2012.
- The Utah Valley University Masterworks Chorale performed Totus Tuus at St. Francis of Assisi Catholic church in Orem, Utah, October 2012, under the direction of Ryan Roberts.
- The Choir of Christ Church Christiana Hundred in Greenville, DE performed the work on December 1, 2013.
- The Louisville Chamber Choir performed “Totus Tuus” at St. James Catholic Church in Louisville, Kentucky, on February 25, 2024, under the direction of Dr. Kent Hatteberg.

== Sources ==
- Helmcke, William. 2014. At the 'Crux' of Henryk Górecki's Totus Tuus, Op. 60: Signification of Polish Catholic Marian Devotion (pp. 136–50). In Interdisciplinary Studies in Musicology 14. Edited Maciej Jabłoński, Jakub Kasperski, Piotr Podlipniak, and Ewa Schreiber.
- Thomas, Adrian. 1997. Górecki. Oxford Studies of Composers. Oxford: Clarendon Press; New York: Oxford University Press. ISBN 0-19-816393-2
- Wordsworth, David. 2013. Pushing Boundaries. Choir and Organ Journal: November and December 2013, pp. 47–51.
