= Sonorism =

Movement in Western classical music

Sonorism (Polish: Sonoryzm) is an approach to musical composition associated with a number of notable Polish composers. The scholar Józef Michał Chomiński coined the term "sonoristics" (Polish: sonorystyka) to describe the urge to explore purely sonic phenomena in composition, and from this term derived "sonorism" to describe an avant-garde style in Polish music of the 1960s that focused on timbre (Chomiński 1961). As a movement, sonorism was initiated in the 1950s in the avant-garde of Polish music (Granat 2008, §i). Music that emphasises sonorism as a compositional approach tends to focus on specific characteristics and qualities of timbre, texture, articulation, dynamics, and motion in an attempt to create freer form. The style is primarily associated with an experimental musical movement which arose in Poland in the mid-1950s and flourished through the 1960s.

Sonorism emphasizes discovering new types of sounds from traditional instruments, as well as the creation of textures by combining different, often unconventional instrumental sounds in unusual and unique ways. The term sonoristics is used to describe this novel approach, which went beyond merely injecting individual color, quirks, and experimentation. It aimed to establish new structural functions in a composition, such as employing non-functional chords for sonorous effects, and emphasizing the sonic aspect of texts in vocal music (Granat 2008).

== History ==
Sonorism is rooted in the nationalistic movement of the 1920s called "Polish colourism", whose best-known exponent is Karol Szymanowski. Sonorism as such was developed in the 1950s and 1960s as a means of gaining freedom from strict serialism, particularly by Krzysztof Penderecki, but also in a number of compositions by Grażyna Bacewicz, Henryk Górecki, Kazimierz Serocki, Wojciech Kilar, Witold Szalonek, Witold Rudziński, Zbigniew Bujarski, Zbigniew Penherski, and Zygmunt Krauze, amongst others (Granat 2008; Rappoport-Gelfand 1991, 68–69).

== Composers associated with sonoristic composition ==
- Tadeusz Baird
- Zbigniew Bujarski
- Andrzej Dobrowolski
- Henryk Mikołaj Górecki
- Wojciech Kilar
- Witold Lutosławski
- Krzysztof Meyer
- Krzysztof Penderecki
- Bogusław Schaeffer
- Kazimierz Serocki
- Witold Szalonek (Granat 2008, §ii)

== See also ==
- Sound mass
- Spectral music
