= Mikołaj Górecki =

Polish composer

Mikołaj Górecki (born 1971) is a Polish composer. He is the son of the composer Henryk Górecki (1933-2010). In 1995 he graduated with honours in composition from the Music Academy in Katowice. In 1996, he received two scholarships from The Banff Centre for the Arts in Canada. In 2000 he received a doctorate in composition from Indiana University, Bloomington in the United States. In 2001-2002 he lectured at McGill University in Montreal. He currently lives and works in the United States.

== Works (in chronological order) ==
- Four pieces for orchestra (1990)
- Concertino for piano and orchestra (1990)
- Appassionato for solo soprano, choir and orchestra (1991)
- Three pieces for clarinet and piano (1992)
- Sonata for clarinet and piano (1994)
- Toccata for two pianos (1996)
- Six bagatelles for violin, cello and piano (1997)
- Sinfonietta for 12 instruments and percussion (1998)
- Trzy fragmenty (Three fragments) for string orchestra (1998)
- Capriccio for piano and orchestra (1998)
- In memoriam (A.Sch., A.R., A.W.) for six instruments (1999)
- Three episodes for orchestra (1999)
- Trzy intermezza (Three intermezzos) for clarinet and string sextet (ver. 1) (1999)
- Trzy intermezza (Three intermezzos) for two clarinets and string orchestra (ver. 2) (1999)
- Sonata no. 1 for violin and piano (1999)
- Arioso for orchestra (2000)
- Gloria for mixed choir and string orchestra (2000)
- Concerto-Notturno for violin and string orchestra (2000)
- Gościu, siądź pod mym liściem (Guest, come sit under my leaves), song to words by Jan Kochanowski for unaccompanied mixed choir (2000)
- Uwertura (Overture) for string quartet (2000)
- Constellations for 15 performers (2001)
- Variations for flute and piano (2002)
- Symphony no. 1 for orchestra (2002)
- Orpheus and Eurydice for orchestra (2003)
- Beata es Virgo Maria for five-part female choir (2004)
- Sonata no. 2 for violin and piano (2004)
- Transfigurations for clarinet (2004)
- Concerto for flute and orchestra (2004)
- Sonata for two pianos (2005)
- Dispersions for string quartet (2006)
- Zan Tontemiquico for orchestra (2006)
- Anamorphoses for orchestra (2006)
- Quartet for clarinet, trombone, cello and piano (2007)
- Concerto grosso for quartertone piano, three instrumental ensembles and orchestra (2008)
- Sinfonica for orchestra (2008)
- Pożegnanie (Farewell) for string orchestra (2009)
- Pożegnanie (Farewell( for violin and piano (2009)
- Divertimento for string orchestra (2009)
- Sonata for piano (2010)
- Nocturne for orchestra (2011)
- Jasności promieniste (Radiating brightness), little mystery for soprano and string orchestra (2012)
- Symphony no. 2 for orchestra (2012)
- Uwertura (Overture) for string orchestra (2000, 2012)
- Trio Titanic for clarinet, horn and piano (2013)
- Arioso e furioso, concerto for guitar, string orchestra and percussion (2014)
- Elegy for cello and string orchestra (2015)
- Missa for solo baritone, mixed choir and orchestra (2015)
- Fanfare for orchestra (2015)
- Trio for alto flute, violin and viola (2015)
- Trio concerto for clarinet, horn, piano and string orchestra (2015)
- Concerto lirico for two string orchestras (2016)
- Sonata lamentosa for soprano, cello and piano (2016)
