= Symphony No. 2 (Górecki) =

Choral symphony by Henryk Górecki

- Copernican
- by Henryk Górecki
- Opus: 31
- Composed: 1972
- Dedication: Kosciuszko Foundation, New York, USA
- Published: 1973
- Movements: 2

Premiere
- Date: 22 June 1973
- Location: Warsaw, Poland
- Performers: Stefania Woytowicz (soprano), Andrzej Hiolski (baritone)

Symphony No. 2, the "Copernican," Op. 31 (II Symfonia "Kopernikowska") (sample) is a choral symphony composed by Henryk Górecki in 1972 to celebrate the 500th anniversary of the birth of astronomer Nicolaus Copernicus. Composed in a monumental style for solo soprano, baritone, choir and orchestra, it features text from Psalms no. 145, 6 and 135, along with an excerpt from Copernicus' book De revolutionibus orbium coelestium.

The symphony was commissioned by the Kosciuszko Foundation in New York and presented to Górecki as an opportunity to reach an audience outside his native Poland. Typically, he undertook extensive research on the subject, and was particularly taken by the philosophical implications of Copernicus' discovery, not all of which he viewed as positive. Norman Davies commented: "His discovery, of the earth's motion round the sun, caused the most fundamental revolutions possible in the prevailing concepts of the human predicament." Its world premiere took place on June 22, 1973 in Warsaw, featuring soprano Stefania Woytowicz and baritone Andrzej Hiolski.

Adrian Thomas writes in the New Grove Dictionary of Music and Musicians, Second Edition, "The second movement marks an important stage in Górecki's conversion to a more consonant language since the late 1960s, a process which was clarified in several choral pieces and the Third Symphony." The symphony is written in two movements, following a binary design Górecki had followed in several previous works, "where the fortissimo dynamic, long silent pauses and rapid, chromatic motifs of the first movement are counterbalanced by a comparatively calm second movement.... The thunderous cosmic vision of the mostly orchestral first movement is answered by a second movement whose proportions are considerably expanded in order to release the earlier tensions."

The second symphony has been performed and recorded less than some of his other work (certainly less than his Symphony No. 3), in part because it demands a particularly large orchestra, soprano and baritone soloists, and a large choir. However, more than one interpretation of Symphony No. 2 is available on compact disc. The most readily available is the Naxos Records CD of the Polish National Radio Symphony Orchestra of Katowice, the Polish Radio Choir and the Silesian Philharmonic Choir with soloists Zofia Kilanowicz and Andrzej Dobber, conducted by Antoni Wit, which includes Beatus Vir.

== Instrumentation ==
The symphony is scored for a very large orchestra.

Woodwinds

4 flutes (3rd and 4th doubling piccolo)
4 oboes
4 clarinet in E♭ (4th doubling bass clarinet in E♭)
4 bassoons (3rd and 4th doubling contrabassoon)

Brass

4 horns in F
4 trumpets in C
4 trombones
tuba

Percussion

3 timpani

3 snare drums
3 bass drums
2 tam-tam

Keyboards

piano

Voices

choir
S-A-T-B
baritone solo
soprano solo

Strings

harp

1st, 2nd and 3rd violins
violas
cellos
contra basses
