= Holy minimalism =

Musical style

- Other names: Mystic minimalism; Spiritual minimalism; Sacred minimalism
- Cultural origins: 1970s, Europe
- Derivative forms: Post-minimalism

Holy minimalism, mystic minimalism, spiritual minimalism, or sacred minimalism are terms, sometimes pejorative, used to describe the musical works of a number of late-twentieth-century composers of Western classical music. The compositions are distinguished by a minimalist compositional aesthetic and a distinctly religious or mystical subject focus.

== Origins ==
With the growing popularity of minimalist music in the 1960s and 1970s, which often broke sharply with prevailing musical aesthetics of serialism and aleatoric music, many composers, building on the work of such minimalists as Terry Riley, Philip Glass and Steve Reich, began to work with more traditional notions of simple melody and harmony in a radically simplified framework. This transition was seen variously as an aspect of musical post-modernism or as neo-romanticism, that is, a return to the lyricism of the nineteenth century.

== Popularity ==
In the 1970s and continuing in the 1980s and 1990s, several composers, many of whom had previously worked in serial or experimental milieux, began working with similar aesthetic ideals – radically simplified compositional materials, a strong foundation in tonality or modality, and the use of simple, repetitive melodies – but included with them an explicitly religious orientation. Many of these composers looked to Renaissance or medieval music for inspiration, or to the liturgical music of the Orthodox Churches, some of which employ only a cappella in their services. Examples include Arvo Pärt (an Estonian Orthodox), John Tavener (a British composer who converted to Russian Orthodoxy), Henryk Górecki (a Polish Catholic), Alan Hovhaness (the earliest mystic minimalist), Sofia Gubaidulina, Giya Kancheli, Hans Otte, Pēteris Vasks and Vladimír Godár.

Despite being grouped together, the composers tend to dislike the term, and are by no means a "school" of close-knit associates.

Recordings have played a major role in the popularization of the term, as all three of the best-known "holy minimalists" (Arvo Pärt, Henryk Górecki, Sir John Tavener) have had significant success with CD sales. A 1992 recording of Górecki's 1976 piece, Symphony No. 3, sold over a million copies. John Tavener has had several recordings of his works nominated for the Mercury Music Prize, and Pärt has a long-term contract with ECM Records, ensuring consistent and wide distribution of recordings of his works.

== Sources ==
- Thomas, Adrian. Górecki. Oxford: Clarendon Press; New York: Oxford University Press, 1997. ISBN 0-19-816393-2
