= Karol and Antoni Szafranek Secondary and Tertiary State School of Music =

Coordinates: 50.0979°N 18.5478°E

Karol and Antoni Szafranek Primary and Secondary State School of Music
- Państwowa Szkoła Muzyczna I i II stopnia im. Karola i Antoniego Szafranków
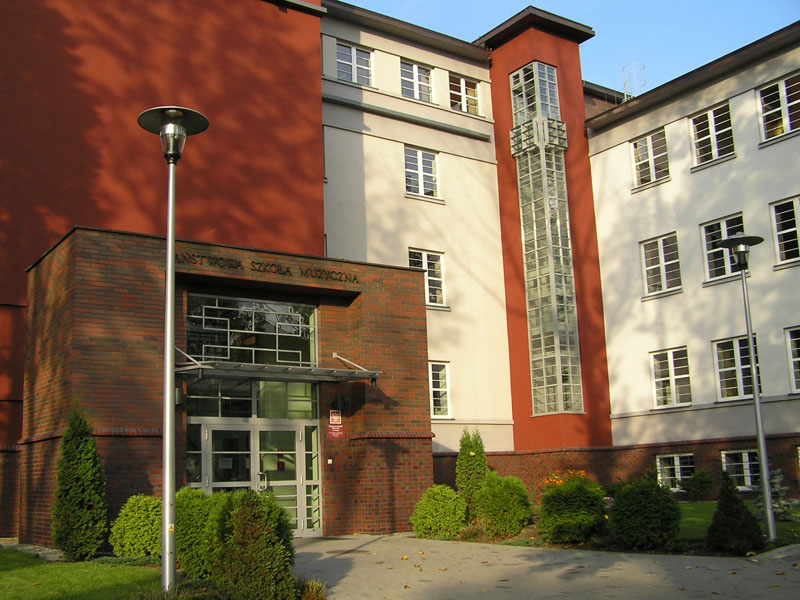

Location
- Powstańców Śląskich 27; Rybnik, 44-200; Poland

Information
- School type: Music College
- Founded: 1933
- Founder: Karol Szafranek, Antoni Szafranek
- Status: Public
- Headmistress: Romana Kuczera
- Age range: 6-25
- Website: http://www.psmrybnik.strefa.pl/

Karol and Antoni Szafranek Secondary and Tertiary State School of Music, pol. Państwowa Szkoła Muzyczna I i II stopnia im. Karola i Antoniego Szafranków is a specialist music school located in Rybnik, Silesian Voivodship, Poland. The school was founded in 1933 by brothers Karol and Antoni Szafranek, eminent musicians, alumni of conservatories in Germany, France and Poland.

== Education ==
The school, as is typical of state music schools in Poland, trains children and adolescents on two levels:

- primary course, usually lasting six years,
- secondary course, lasting also six years and finishing with obtaining an Artist Diploma in Performance.

Graduates of the school may enter music universities.

== Areas of study ==
- Principal instruments: piano, violin, viola, cello, double bass, accordion, guitar, flute, oboe, clarinet, saxophone, trombone, French horn, trumpet, bassoon, pipe organ
- Additional musical subjects: ear training, history of music, music literature, music analysis, harmony and counterpoint, accompaniment, chamber music, choir, music in liturgy, orchestra and big-band

== Notable alumni ==
- composer Henryk Mikołaj Górecki
- pianist Piotr Paleczny
- pianist Lidia Grychtołówna
- jazz pianist Adam Makowicz
