= Miserere (Górecki) =

1981 work by Henryk Górecki

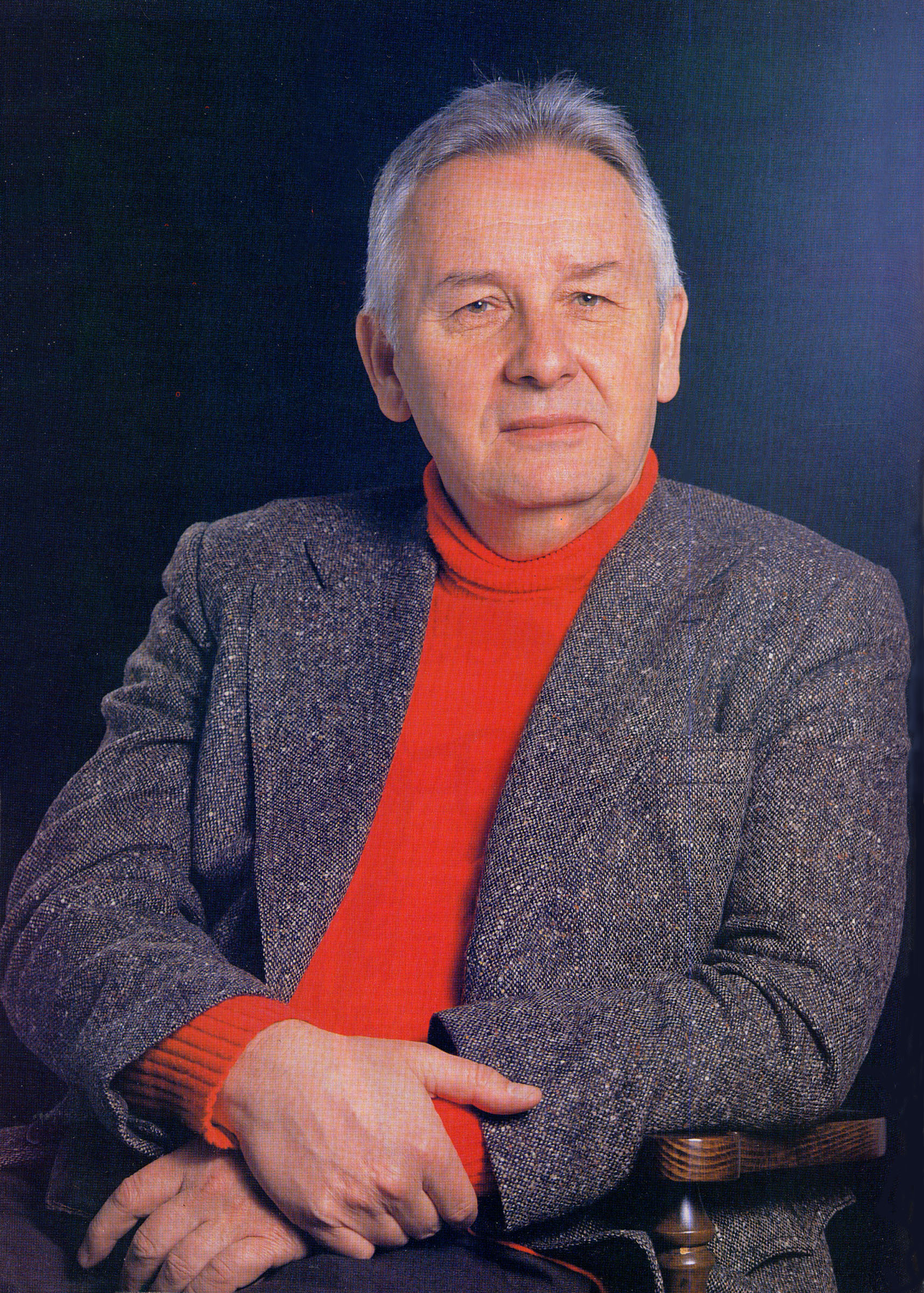
Henryk Górecki in 1993

Miserere, Op. 44 (sample) is a choral work composed in 1981 by Henryk Górecki for large (120 voices) a cappella mixed choir. The text comprises five words: 'Domine Deus Noster' (Lord our God), which are repeated for the first ten sections, resolved by a chorus of 'Miserere nobis' (Have mercy on us) in the eleventh and final section. Both lines of text are sung as imploring pleas. A typical performance lasts 35 minutes.

Górecki composed the work in 1981 in protest to government intervention against the Polish Solidarity trade union - specifically, in response to the government-sanctioned assault of activists in Bydgoszcz. After martial law was enacted in December of that year, performance of the piece became impossible, and it was not performed until 1987. The first performance took place on 10 September 1987 in St. Stanisłaus Church Włocławek, and a day later in Bydgoszcz, with Stanisław Krawczyńskiconducting the Bydgoszcz Philharmonic Choir.

== Background ==
Henryk Górecki dedicated his Miserere to the city of Bydgoszcz. Bydgoszcz was the site of a confrontation between members of the opposition organizations Solidarity and Rural Solidarity (which were made up of an estimated one-third of the Polish population) and the Polish militia. At around ten past seven on 19 March 1981, approximately two hundred militia, sent in to remove the organizations from a prolonged negotiation with the Provisional Council, violently assaulted the organizations’ members. In the confrontation, one was left with contusions to the skull and ribs and suspected brain damage; two others were seriously injured, inflaming an already unhappy Polish populace. Nine months after the incident in Bydgoszcz, the opposition organizations was outlawed, and the general of the Army Wojciech Jaruzelski declared a state of martial law. During this period, no performance of the work was possible, and Górecki placed the completed work out of sight. He revised the work in 1987 before its premiere in Włocławek on September 10, 1987, at the 15th Bydgoszcz Music Festival. Włocławek had been the site of the 1984 assassination of the priest Jerzy Popiełuszko by state police and made a fitting scene for the performance of a work dedicated to those so violently oppressed by their government. Promotion of the premiere was prohibited by the authorities, but every seat ended up occupied.

After his Third Symphony of 1976, Górecki was to embrace smaller-scale musical forms, such as short unaccompanied choral works (e.g. Broad Waters, Op. 39, his Five Marian songs, Op. 54) and chamber works; Miserere was to be the only large-scale work within the 1980s, reminiscent of his 2nd and 3rd symphonies in compositional scale and performer numbers. At the same time, his music became both harmonically and melodically simpler in his writing than in his previous serial compositions. Three primary musical influences also became apparent in his compositional style: Polish folksong, Catholic chant and the Polish music of the past, primarily the works of Karol Szymanowski. Out of these influences evolved two compositional kernels in Górecki’s music: Górecki’s “motto” motif (a rise of a minor third, usually on the first three pitches of the Aeolian or Dorian scales); and the “Skierkowski turn” (the Górecki motto followed by a descending half-step) named for the Polish folk music collector who influenced the music of Karol Szymanowski. Górecki’s motto and turn are essential motivic elements in the Miserere. In fact, the very first notes of the work are the motto and turn in A Aeolian (pitches A-B-C-B) sung in unison by the Bass II’s. There is also an abundance of sacred musical influence at play in the Miserere. The monodic opening is based on a traditional Polish chant. The following two-part section, with the added Bass I, reflects the two-part sacred singing common in Polish religious services. The repetitive nature of each of the simple melodies is yet another example of chant influence. Finally, Górecki’s indication of a minimum of 120 singers in the chorus evokes the sound of congregational singing.

== Structure ==
Like many of his compositions, Górecki indicates the duration of the performance of the Miserere. The 37-minute-long work for a large mixed choir is essentially all in A Aeolian in an arch form. It builds in intensity to a climactic point and then returns. Górecki composed the Miserere for eight voice parts (Sopranos I+II, Altos I + II, Tenors I+II, Bass I+II) with an additive structure. This means each vocal entrance is added over the top of the parts already present. Górecki scholar Adrian Thomas calls these sections “paragraphs.” Each section builds on the preceding paragraph but have their own distinctive character.

Miserere Op. 44, contains 11 sections delineated by the composer through approximate performance durations for each section. The first section begins with the second basses with the next highest part. The only departure from this formula is in Section 8, when Gorecki holds the expected first soprano entrance until Section 9. The first ten sections are sung to the text "Domine Deus noster", with the last section sung to "MISERERE NOBIS", bolded in Górecki's own hand.

Throughout the whole piece only white-key notes are used, with a strong reliance on the interval of the third. Sections 2-6 all involve chords generally built on stacked thirds, most notably 9th chords on A in the 4th-6th section. The 7th section is noticeably simpler in texture and harmony; the Alto, Tenor and Bass hold an E for nearly the whole movement as the Sop II sing a cantus. Throughout the whole piece, Górecki marks the term 'błagalnie' (imploringly), a commentary on the text - in itself from the Psalms (Ps. 105:47) and the Agnus Dei of the Roman Rite. The 8th section, a gigantic fortissimo section, never resolves itself - it cadences on its own dominant, G, and never resolves into the tonic, avoiding any sense of victory. This is reflective of the fact that Górecki never meant the Miserere to be triumphant, given the context was written in.

The final and eleventh section is quiet, yet 'błagalnie'; it returns to the A Aeolian mode after a shift in the tonal centre (to E in the 7th section, to C in the 8th), hammering out the same A minor chords only with slight shifts in the melodic line. Throughout the last section, each melodic part moves by at most a four-note range, but the harmonic range is static. He solves the issue of sticking only with white keys by using an IV43 chord in place of a dominant chord, which would require the use of a G-sharp. The repeated meditation of the A minor "MISERERE NOBIS" chords gives the piece a finality that would otherwise have been problematic.
