= Two Sacred Songs, Op. 30 (Górecki) =

Two Sacred Songs, Op. 30 is a 1971 work by the Polish composer Henryk Górecki for baritone and piano; the lyrics are two poems in Polish by Marek Skwarnicki. Although the music demonstrates the sacred and contemplative aspect of Górecki's music, the piece still bears the traces of the earlier period of Górecki's composition, as is marked by the more violent and dissonant aspects of the work.

== Text ==
The text for the songs comes from the poems Offertorium and Introit by the contemporary Polish poet Marek Skwarnicki (1930–2013). The poems had recently been published in Poland's main Catholic weekly, Tygodnik Powszechny, when Górecki composed the piece in 1971. As the Polish critic, Krzysztof Droba, has noted, "The lyrical subject of Skwarnicki's verses uses phrases taken from prayer books, uses ordinary words taken from the popular language of the church, from Polish liturgies, litanies. Such prose-like language, used colloquially, makes his utterance free of poetical embellishment, of literary conventions, of cross-references to any cultural code. It is authentic, personal poetry."

== Performance history ==
The recorded premiere was marked by Gorecki: Life Journey by Chamber Domaine (Landor Records, 2008). The UK concert premiere was given by Chamber Domaine on 4 of December 2008 at Gresham College, London.

== Bibliography ==
- Thomas, Adrian (2008). "Booklet notes" (PDF). Landor Records. Archived from the original (PDF) on 19 February 2012. Companion booklet for the CD Gorecki: Life Journey incorporating musical performances by Chamber Domaine. The booklet includes translations of the Polish lyrics into English.
- Henryk Górecki, lecture at Gresham College by Professor Adrian Thomas
