= Tadeusz Baird =

Polish composer (1928–1981)

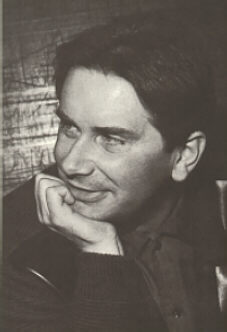
- Born: 26 July 1928; Munich, Bavaria, Germany
- Died: 2 September 1981 (aged 53); Grodzisk Mazowiecki, Poland
- Occupation: Composer
- Organizations: Warsaw Autumn

Tadeusz Baird (26 July 1928 – 2 September 1981) was a Polish composer.

== Biography ==
Baird was born in Grodzisk Mazowiecki, in Poland. His father Edward was Polish, while his mother Maria (née Popov) was Russian. In 1944 at the age of 16 he was deported to Germany as a forced labourer, and after a failed escape attempt was imprisoned in a concentration camp. After liberation by the Americans he spent six months recovering at the military hospital in Zweckel before returning to Poland. Between 1947 and 1951 Baird studied composition and musicology in Warsaw under Piotr Rytek and Kazimierz Sikorski, and piano with Tadeusz Wituski. In 1949 he founded Group 49 along with Kazimierz Serocki and Jan Krenz. The aim of Group 49 was to write communicative and expressive music according to socialist realism, the dominant ideology in the Eastern Bloc at the time.

After Stalin's death in 1953 he increasingly turned to serialism. In 1956, along with Kazimierz Serocki, he founded the Warsaw Autumn international contemporary music festival. In 1974 he began to teach composition at the National College of Music (currently the Music Academy) in Warsaw. In 1977, now a full professor, he was offered a post to teach a composition class at the Warsaw Academy of Music, and also membership in the Academie der Künste der Deutschen Demokratischen Republik – Berlin in 1979.

He died suddenly in Warsaw on September 2, 1981 at age 53, as a result of a brain aneurysm.

== Compositions ==
He wrote both large-scale symphonies and chamber music; however, of great importance in his output are numerous vocal cycles inspired by poetry. He was also a composer of film and theatre music. Baird's music is usually melodic, lyrical, very expressive, and intensely subjective. It is often rooted in the post-Romantic tradition, despite the use of serial techniques. Alistair Wightman identifies Baird as "a late Romantic lyricist and successor not only to Berg, but Mahler and Szymanowski". Like Berg, his use of serialism was always very free and expressive, as in his String Quartet (1957).

But the later works, starting with the 1966 one-act opera Jutro ("tomorrow", based on the short story by Joseph Conrad) become darker, particularly in the orchestral piece Psychodrama (1972) and in his final work, the song cycle for baritone and orchestra Głosy z oddali (‘Voices from afar’), which sets a bleak text by Jarosław Iwaszkiewicz on the subject of death and personal extinction. This change in perspective was a result of the traumatic experiences he faced during World War II and on into the early 1950s. Barbara Literska sees him as "a prophet of the future of music (postmodernity)".

=== Music for solo instruments ===
- Sonatina I (1949) for solo piano
- Sonatina II (1952) for solo piano
- Little Suite for Children (1952) for solo piano

=== Chamber music ===
- Two Caprices for Clarinet and Piano (1953) (2nd Prize, Polish Composers' Union)
- Cztery Preludia [Four Preludes] for Bassoon and Piano (1954)
- Divertimento for Flute, Clarinet, Oboe, and Bassoon (1956)
- String Quartet (1957)
- Play for String Quartet (1971)
- Variations in Rondo Form for String Quartet (1978)

=== Orchestral works ===
- Sinfonietta (1949)
- Symphony I (1950) - Polish National Prize, 1951
- Colas Breugnon: a suite in the old style for string orchestra with flute (1951)
- Symphony II, quasi una fantasia (1952)
- Concerto for Orchestra (1953)
- Cassazione per orchestra (1956)
- Four Essays (1958) - UNESCO Prize, 1959
- Variations Without a Theme (1962)
- Epiphany Music (1963)
- Four Novelettes for chamber orchestra (1967)
- Sinfonia Breve (1968)
- Symphony III (1969) - National Prize, 1970
- Psychodrama (1972)
- Elegia (1973)
- Canzona (1980)

=== Concertos ===
- Piano Concerto (1949)
- Four Dialogs for oboe and chamber orchestra (1964) - UNESCO Prize 1966
- Oboe Concerto (1973)
- Scenes for cello, harp and orchestra (1977)
- Concerto Lugubre (1975) for viola and orchestra

=== Vocal-instrumental works ===
- Four Love Sonnets for baritone and orchestra (1956) to texts by Shakespeare
- Exhortation for reciting voice and orchestra (1960) to old Hebrew texts
- Erotyki for soprano and orchestra (1961) to texts by Małgorzata Hilar
- Five Songs for mezzo-soprano and six instruments (1970) to texts by H. Poświatowska - National Prize, 1970
- Goethe Letters: Cantata for Baritone for mixed choir and orchestra (1970) to texts by Goethe and Charlotta von Stein
- Głosy z oddali [Voices from Afar] for baritone and symphony orchestra (1981) to texts by J. Iwaszkiewicz (1981)

=== Opera ===
- Tomorrow, a musical drama to a libretto by J. S. Sito (1964-66)

=== Film Music ===
- Warsaw In Canaletto Paintings (Warszawa W Obrazach Canaletta) (1955)
- The Noose (Pętla) (1958)
- The Stone Sky (Kamienne Niebo) (1959)
- Year One (Rok Pierwszy) (1960)
- April (Kwiecień) (1961)
- The Artillery Sergeant Kalen (Ogniomistrz Kalen) (1961)
- Night Train (Ludzie Z Pociągu) (1961)
- Samson (1961)
- Between The Shores (Między brzegami) (1962)
- Those Who Are Late (Spoznieni Przechodnie) (1962)
- Manhunter (Naganiacz) (1963)
- The Passenger (Pasażerka) (1963)
- Room For One (Miejsce Dla Jednego) (1963)
- Their Every Day Life (Ich Dzien Powszedni) (1963)
- The Unknown (Nieznany) (1964)
- Visit At The Kings (Wizyta U Królów) (1965)
- Rugged Creativeness (Szorstka Twórczość) (!967)
- When Love Was A Crime (Kiedy Miłość Była Zbrodnią) (1967)

== Recordings ==
- Eastern Discoveries. MSR MS1517 (2015). Four preludes for bassoon and piano
- Epiphany Music. Olympia OCD 312 (1989). Epiphany Music for orchestra, Elegia For orchestra, Four Love Sonnets, Symphony No 3
- Film Music, Volumes 1 and 2. Olympia OCD 604 (1994) and OCD 607 (1995)
- Günter Wand: The Radio Recordings. Profil PH13038 (2016). Four Dialogues for oboe and orchestra
- Orchestral Works. Koch 3-6770-2 (2001). Psychodrama, Oboe Concerto, Scenes for cello, harp and orchestra, Conzona for orchestra, Concerto Lugubre for viola and orchestra
- Polish Piano Concertos. Dux 0651 (2009). Piano Concerto
- Polish Songs. Acte Prealable APO 274 (2013). Trouveurs’ Songs
- Psychodrama. Olympia 326 (2000). Psychodrama, Tomorrow
- Songs and Orchestral Music. Olympia OCD 388 (1993). Voices From Afar, Goethe-Briefe, Scene For cello and harp With orchestra, Canzona for orchestra
- Streichquartette. Colosseum 0648 (1986). Play for string quartet, Variations on Rondo Form, String Quartet No 1
- Szymanowski, Gorecki, Baird. EMI 5 65418 (1995). Colas Breugnon Suite

== See also ==
- Polish School (music)
