= Kleines Requiem für eine Polka =

Composition by Henry Górecki

- Requiem by Henryk Górecki
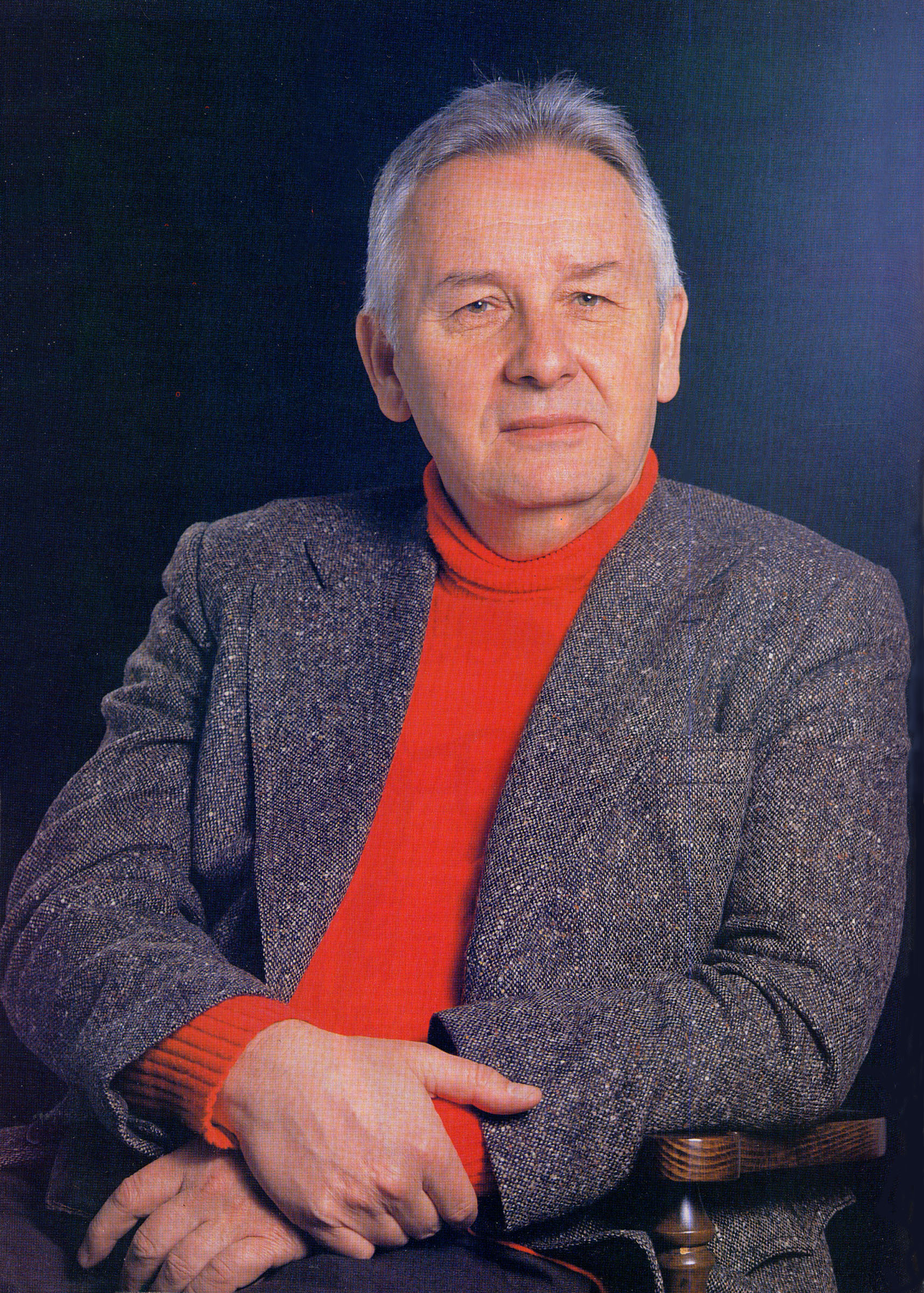
- Górecki in 1993
- Opus: 66
- Year: 1993
- Period: Contemporary music
- Performed: 12 June 1993: Amsterdam
- Published: 1995
- Publisher: Boosey & Hawkes
- Duration: 25 minutes
- Movements: 4
- Scoring: Ensemble

Kleines Requiem für eine Polka (Polish: Małe requiem dla pewnej polki, lit. 'Little Requiem for a Certain Polka'), Op. 66, is a requiem for piano and thirteen instruments by Polish composer Henryk Górecki. Written in 1993, it is one of the last compositions for ensemble by the composer.

== Background ==
In the years leading up to the completion of the Requiem, Górecki had established close ties with European and American countries, particularly the Netherlands, where his Concerto-Cantata premiered in Amsterdam in November 1992. Shortly after the premiere, the Holland Festival and the Schönberg Ensemble commissioned this piece, originally titled "Nocna Serenada" (Night Serenade), which was later premiered in June 1993 in Amsterdam as Kleines Requiem für eine Polka (Little Requiem for a Polka). Górecki has largely kept the meaning of this composition private. While he has stated that the title reflects his sadness at the breakup of Czechoslovakia, where the polka is indigenous, the word "Polka" is also recognized by Polish speakers as a "Polish woman", an idea reinforced by the juxtaposition of German and Polish used in the title.

The piece was first performed on June 12, 1993, as part of the 1993 Holland Festival at the Beurs van Berlage, Wang Zaal, by the Schoenberg Ensemble, conducted by Reinbert de Leeuw. The first recording of the composition was made by the London Sinfonietta, conducted by David Zinman, and released on Elektra Nonesuch 7559-79362-2. It was later published by Boosey & Hawkes in 1995.

== Structure ==
The Requiem is divided into four movements of varying tempo, featuring fast and slow tempi that alternate between episodes of funereal bells and piano solos. The movement list is as follows:

1. Tranquillo — Tranquillissimo — Poco più mosso. Dolce, sereno — Lento — Marcato, ma ben tenuto — Quasi in lo stesso tempo (Dolce, sereno) — Largo
2. Allegro impetuoso, marcatissimo — Subito meno mosso ma sempre impetuoso e marcatissimo — Sempre più lento, più largamente — Adagio molto
3. Allegro, deciso assai
4. Adagio, cantabile — Quasi cadenza — Largo

The instrumentation for the piece includes flute, oboe, bassoon, clarinet in Bb, trumpet in C, trombone, piano, horn in F, tubular bells, and strings (first violin, second violin, viola, cello, and double bass). The duration of the piece is 25 minutes.

Despite its name, Kleines Requiem für eine Polka does not follow the traditional polka conventions. The work begins with a bell and piano section with pedal and resonance effects, meant to evoke a mysterious and obsessive atmosphere. The music alternates between dramatic and lyrical passages, with enigmatic chords, timbre games, and sound effects. The second and third movements of the piece are far removed from the typical rhythmic configurations of polkas, despite the real or illusory 2/4 time and the popular connotations of the "off-beat" harmonies typical of polkas. The composition does not echo or commemorate the refined varieties of polkas cultivated by Smetana and others. Instead, the musical character and rhythmic configurations of Kleines Requiem reflect Górecki's distinct style and draw on his roots in folksong and church-song.

=== Movements ===
The opening movement of the piece combines ternary and rondeau forms and begins with a combination of tubular bells and solo piano that abandons Górecki's typical gradually evolving melody in favor of repeated phrases. The piano's motivic fragment evokes Polish folk traditions with its "turn" repetitions and Lydian modality, while also coincidentally resembling the incipit of the "Dies irae" sequence. The movement continues with several melodic and accompanimental ideas that maintain a reflective tranquility, with an instrumental emphasis on the two violins and piano.

The second movement begins explosively after a pair of short rising phrases on sustained strings, featuring irregular combinations and repetitions of duple and triple meters. The piano alternates between different triads, while the twisting "choral" unison of wind and strings is dominated by the timbres of the brass. This movement is through-composed, with subsequent sections and a coda winding down rather than maintaining the aggression of the opening. The second section of the movement returns to the piano's bass A minor chord, incorporating one of Górecki's quasi-arpeggic ideas heard previously in the Concerto-Cantata's Recitativo. The harmonies of G and C introduce a major-minor slant, recalling chords in the third movement of "Songs of Joy and Rhythm."

The third movement of Kleines Requiem is considered the most self-contained and rounded of the four movements. It is similar in structure to the third movement of Górecki's second string quartet and features a sequence of melodic ideas with a dancing accompaniment. The piano, which is prominently featured in the title of the work, plays an "oompah-oompah" accompaniment on A major, followed by dominant sevenths on E. This section of the movement is a carefree recreation of popular music-making, reminiscent of village hall or circus music. However, the emphatic rhythms are weighed down by the static harmonics, and the passage does not provide a resolution to the tensions created in the earlier movements.

The fourth and final movement of Kleines Requiem serves as both a finale and a coda, and resolves the tensions created in earlier movements. The movement begins with the strings repeating their chordal progression from the coda of the second movement, and gradually fades away, with a brief obbligato on the horn. The piano and tubular bells toll in the distance with the faintest of echoes from the very beginning of the work.

== Reception ==
The Requiem has garnered little attention, as it is not very commonly performed or recorded.
