= Adrian Thomas (composer) =

British composer

Adrian Thomas is Emeritus Professor of Music at Cardiff University School of Music. He specializes in Polish Music.

== Academic career ==
Thomas began his professional career at Queen's University Belfast in 1973. Between 1983 and 1984, he was a visiting fellow at University of California, San Diego, and after his return to Queen’s University he became the Hamilton Harty Professor of Music in 1985. He held this position until 1996, when he took up his role at Cardiff University. He retired in 2010.

In addition to this, in 1983, 1986 and 1987, he held composition fellowships at the MacDowell Colony in New Hampshire. Between 2003 and 2006, Thomas was the Professor of Music at Gresham College in London.

== Public career ==
In the late 1970s and early 1980s, Thomas conducted concerts with the Ulster Orchestra and contemporary music ensembles such as Lontano. In the 1980s he had several compositions broadcast by BBC Radio 3, including a commission for the BBC Singers, Black Rainbow (1989). In 1990-93 he was seconded by Queen’s University to the BBC, to become the Head of Music for BBC Radio 3, where, in 1993, he initiated the music and arts festival, Polska!, a nationwide celebration of Polish music and culture.

Between 2003 and 2006, as Gresham Professor of Music, Thomas delivered series of public lectures on Polish and Central European music. He was subsequently elected a Fellow of Gresham College (2006–09) and Emeritus Professor in 2009.

He has served on public committees and boards at the Arts Councils in Northern Ireland and Wales and on the Research Panel for the Performing Arts at the Arts and Humanities Research Board (2000–03).

== Academic interests ==
Adrian Thomas is a specialist on Polish music and has published widely on the topic. He has given research papers, public talks and broadcasts in Europe, the USA and Australia. He is the author of over fifty entries on twentieth-century Polish music in the Second Edition of The New Grove Dictionary of Music and Musicians (2000–01). For his 1997 book, Górecki, Thomas received the Wilk Book Prize for Research in Polish Music (2002). He has received awards from the Polish Composers' Union (1989), the Polish Government (Order of Merit for Polish Culture, 1996) and the Lutosławski Society in Warsaw (2005).

== Books ==
- Witold Lutosławski: Cello Concerto (Ashgate, in preparation), ISBN 978-0-7546-1958-1
- Polish Music since Szymanowski (Cambridge: CUP, 2005), ISBN 978-0-511-07402-8)
- Górecki (Oxford: OUP, 1997), ISBN 0-19-816393-2)
- Bacewicz: Chamber and Orchestral Music (Los Angeles: USC, 1985), ISBN 0-916545-03-2)
