= Warsaw Autumn =

Annual music festival in Warsaw, Poland

Warsaw Autumn Warszawska Jesień
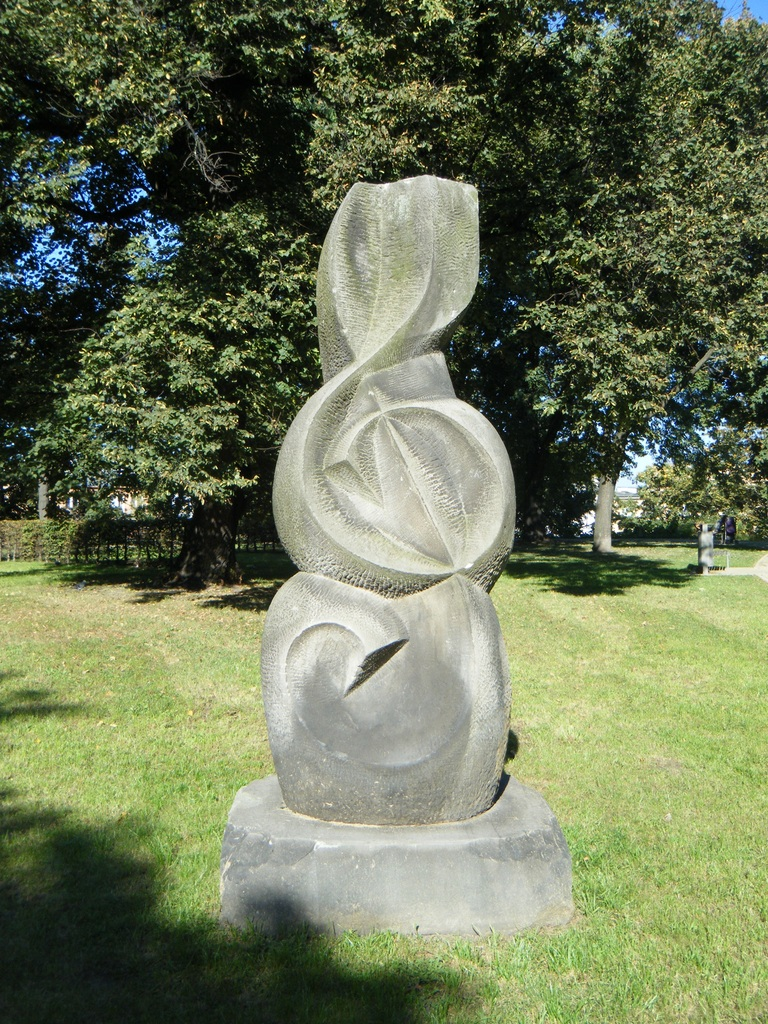
- Sculpture Warsaw Autumn (treble clef) by Karol Tchorek (1976)
- Genre: Experimental music, contemporary classical music
- Dates: September
- Location: Poland
- Years active: 1956, 1958–1981, 1983–present
- Founders: Tadeusz Baird and Kazimierz Serocki, Head Board of the Polish Composers' Union
- Website: warszawska-jesien.art.pl

Warsaw Autumn (Polish: Warszawska Jesień) is the largest Polish festival of contemporary music. It was established in 1956 by composers Tadeusz Baird and Kazimierz Serocki, and is administered by the Polish Composers' Union. It is an annual event, normally taking place in the second half of September.

== History ==
The first festival took place in October 1956. (In 1957 and 1982 there was no festival.)

From the beginning the festival's aim has been to present new music from Poland and around the world. Adrian Thomas notes that the music performed at Warsaw Autumn between 1958 and 1961 "clearly charts the process of informing Polish audiences and composers of what was happening in the West. At the same time, the amount of Polish repertoire increased from 25% in 1958 to 30% in 1961.

The Polish Composers' Union still plays a large role in the organisation of the festival, and the director of the festival is currently Jerzy Kornowicz.

== Significant Repertoire ==
The Warsaw Autumn has always featured many Polish and World premieres. As an example, the following list includes some of the pieces that were premiered between 1956 and 1961 (Thomas 2005, 320–31).

=== 1956 ===
- Witold Lutosławski, Concerto for Orchestra (1963 UNESCO 1st Prize)

=== 1958 ===
- Tadeusz Baird, Four Essays (World Premiere) (1959 UNESCO 1st Prize (shared with Lutosławski))
- Henryk Górecki, Epitaph (World Premiere)
- Witold Lutosławski, Musique funèbre / Funeral Music (1959 UNESCO 1st Prize (shared with Baird))

=== 1959 ===
- Henryk Górecki, Symphony No. 1 (World Premiere) (1961 UNESCO Youth Biennale 1st Prize)

1960

- Henryk Górecki, Scontri (World Premiere)

=== 1961 ===
- Tadeusz Baird, Love Poems (World Premiere)
- Henryk Górecki, Three Diagrams (World Premiere)
- Witold Lutosławski, Jeux vénitiens / Venetian Games (World Premiere) (1962 UNESCO 1st Prize)
- Krzysztof Penderecki, Threnody to the Victims of Hiroshima (World Premiere) (1961 UNESCO Winner)

== See also ==
- List of experimental music festivals
- Kontrasty

== Sources ==
- Thomas, Adrian (2005). Polish Music since Szymanowski. Cambridge: Cambridge University Press. ISBN 978-0-511-48203-8. OCLC 252494422.
