= Kazimierz Serocki =

Polish composer

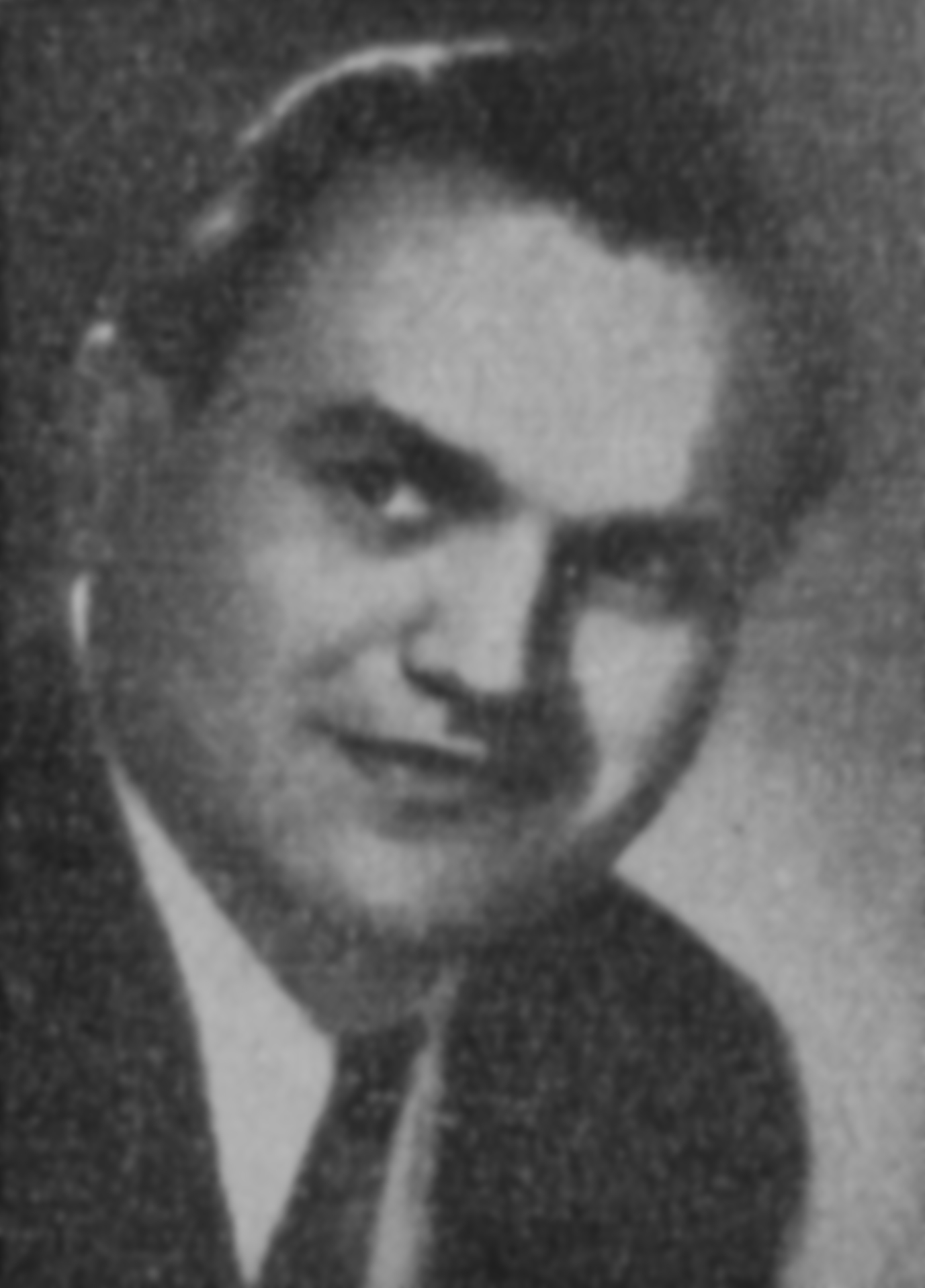
Kazimierz Serocki (before 1952)

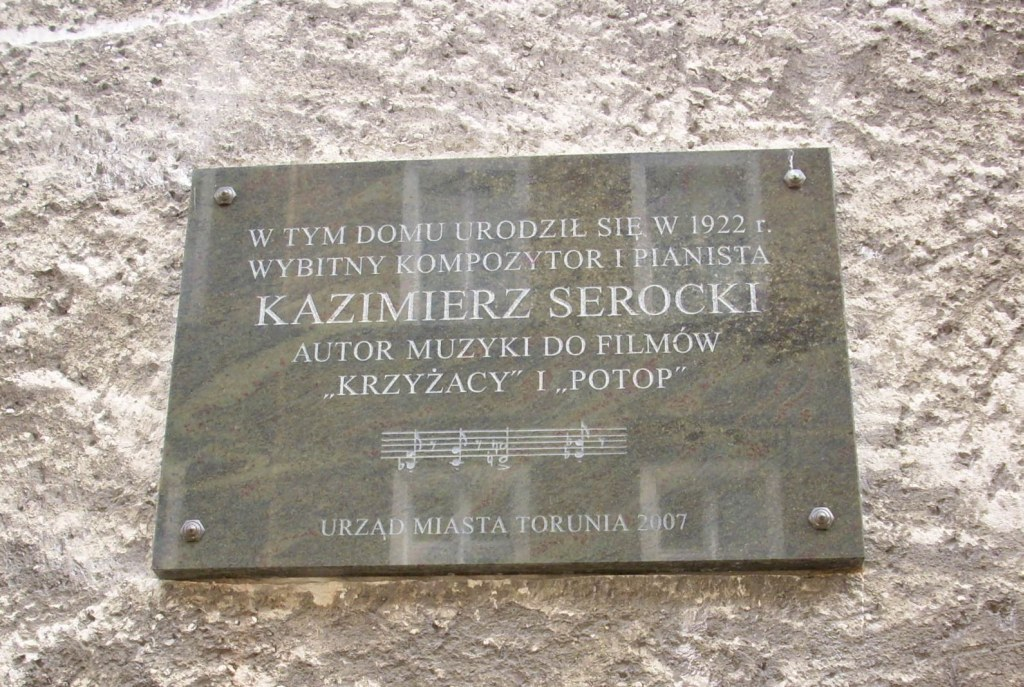
Kazimierz-Serocki-plaque-in-Torun-Poland

Kazimierz Serocki (3 March 1922 – 9 January 1981) was a Polish composer and one of the founders of the Warsaw Autumn contemporary music festival.

== Life ==
Serocki was born in Toruń. He studied composition with Kazimierz Sikorski and piano with Stanisław Szpinalski at the State Higher School of Music in Łódź and graduated in 1946. He continued in Paris, studying composition with Nadia Boulanger and piano with Lazare Lévy, before graduating in 1947-1948. Between 1946 and 1951 he performed many times as a concert pianist in Poland and abroad, but for the rest of his career, he was focused exclusively on composition. Serocki's output is concentrated in two main spheres: orchestral music and vocal-instrumental pieces to Polish texts selected with fine discrimination. His main compositional idea was to explore sound color in music. His last work – Pianophonie (1979) – used the possibilities provided by electronic processing of live piano sound.

Serocki was one of the founders, along with Tadeusz Baird, of the Warsaw Autumn international contemporary music festival (1956). Together with Tadeusz Baird and Jan Krenz he formed the composers' group Group 49. He was vice-president of the central administration of the Polish Composers' Union from 1954 to 1955. He received a number of Polish and foreign awards, including several State Prizes, among them one in 1952 for his music to the film Young Chopin. He also received a prize at the UNESCO competition in 1959, for the Sinfonietta and the award of the Minister of Culture and Fine Arts in 1963 for the whole of his work. He died, aged 58, in Warsaw.

== Works ==
=== Chamber music ===
- Suite for 4 trombones - 1953
- Sonatina for trombone and piano - 1954
- Dance for clarinet and piano - 1954
- Improvisationen für Blockflöten-Quartett - 1959
- Continuum - sextet for percussion instruments - 1966
- Swinging Music for clarinet, trombone, cello or double bass, and piano - 1970
- Fantasmagoria for piano and percussion - 1971
- Arrangements for 1-4 recorders - 1975-1976

=== Orchestral works and concertos ===
- Three Melodies from Kurpie for 6 sopranos, 6 tenors, and chamber orchestra - 1949
- Romantic Concerto for piano and orchestra - 1950
- Symphony No. 1 - 1952
- Symphony No. 2, "Symphony of Song" for soprano, baritone, choir, and orchestra - 1953
- Concerto for trombone and orchestra - 1953
- Sinfonietta for 2 string orchestras - 1956
- Heart of the Night, song cycle for baritone and orchestra - 1956
- Eyes of the Air, song cycle for soprano and orchestra - 1957
- Musica concertante - 1958
- Episodes for strings and 3 groups of percussion - 1959
- Segmenti - 1961
- Symphonic Frescoes - 1964
- Niobe, music to extracts from a poem by Konstanty Ildefons Gałczyński for 2 reciters (man and woman), mixed choir, and orchestra - 1966
- Forte e piano, music for two pianos and orchestra - 1967
- Poems, to words by Tadeusz Różewicz for soprano and chamber orchestra - 1969
- Dramatic Story for orchestra - 1971
- Fantasia elegiaca for organ and orchestra - 1972
- Impromptu fantasque for recorders, mandolins, guitars, percussion and piano - 1973
- Sonatina for trombone and orchestra - 1974 (arrangement of the 1954 Sonatina)
- Concerto alla cadenza per flauto a becco e orchestra - 1974
- Ad libitum five pieces for symphony orchestra - 1973-1977
- Pianophonie for piano, electronic transformation of sound and orchestra - 1976-1978

=== Solo instruments ===
- Suite of Preludes for piano - 1952
- Brownies (Krasnoludki), 7 miniatures for children for piano - 1953
- Sonata for piano - 1955
- A piacere, suggestions for piano - 1963

=== Voice and piano ===
- Heart of the Night (Serce nocy), song cycle for baritone and piano (text: K.I. Gałczyński) - 1956
- Eyes of the Air (Oczy powietrza), song cycle for soprano and piano (text: J. Przyboś) - 1957

=== 4-part unaccompanied mixed choir ===
- Songs of Midsummer Night, suite, folk text - 1954
- Suite, from the Opole Region in Silesia, folk text - 1954

== See also ==
- Polish School (music)
