= Beatus Vir (Górecki) =

Beatus Vir, Op. 38, subtitled Psalm for baritone, large mixed chorus and grand orchestra, is a musical psalm setting written by Henryk Górecki in 1979 . The text is drawn from several psalms (143:1,6-10; 31:16; 88:2; 67:7; 34:9), and the title is from the last of these: "Blest is the man that trusteth in Him". The work was premiered on 9 June 1979, in Kraków, Poland, with Baritone Jerzy Mechlinski and the Kraków Philharmonic Orchestra and Chorus, conducted by the composer.

The work was a commission by then-Cardinal Karol Wojtyła (later selected Pope John Paul II) for the commemoration on the 900th anniversary of the martyrdom of St. Stanisław. Beatus Vir was intended as the first work in a larger cycle entitled Sancti tui Domine florebunt sicut lilium. No other works of the cycle were completed, however Górecki stated that the next piece in the cycle would be entitled Offertorium.

Górecki spent more time selecting the texts for Beatus Vir than he did composing the music of the work. The Latin text consists of selections from the Book of Psalms and was chosen to "emphasize doubts and supplications" and project the "spiritual and moral aspects of the tragedy of St. Stanisalus… rather than any sort of representational drama."

Górecki indicates the Beatus Vir Psalm is for "Grand" Orchestra of 4 flutes, 4 oboes, 4 B-flat clarinets, 4 bassoons (doubling 2 contrabassoons), 4 B-flat trumpets, 4 horns in F, 4 trombones, 4 tubas (if 4 tubas are unavailable, two of the tuba parts may be played by a 5th and 6th trombone), 2 percussionists, 2 harps and 4-hand piano, and strings. The piece lasts some 29 minutes in performance.

== Background ==
=== Context ===
In 1978, Henryk Górecki was in his second three-year term as Rector of the University of Music in Katowice. At the school, the composer found himself surrounded by ardent members of the Party at all levels of the institution. Without many independently minded musical colleagues with whom to interact Górecki was generally unhappy in his post. Meanwhile, Górecki received a commission from Cardinal Wojtyła in honor of the 900th anniversary of the assassination of Bishop (later Saint) Stanislaus in 1079. By the fifteenth century, the saint had become the patron saint of Poland, held what are believed to be obvious and potentially dangerous parallels to Poland's soviet masters. The saint, through his life and, more importantly his death by assassination, is an intrinsic symbol of the state at odds with the church and held particular poignancy in 1970s Poland. Górecki's acceptance of the cardinal's commission forced him into the role of outsider and he was summarily ostracized by his peers.

Party members even went so far as to remove all mention of Górecki from documents and newspapers pertaining to important musical events in Poland. The composer quickly resigned his post as Rector of the Higher School and, upon the election of Cardinal Wojtyła to the papal throne in October 1978, found himself working at breakneck pace to complete the work in time for its premiere; it was to be June 9, 1979, the first pilgrimage of then Pope John Paul II to his native land since his election. The premiere occurred as planned, with the composer conducting the work in the presence of the pope, who praised the Beatus vir publicly even as he was openly condemning Poland's communist leaders. This would add to already rising tensions between the Church and the Polish Government.

=== Position in Górecki musical development ===
Beginning in the late 1960s and early 1970s, Górecki began to compose larger scale works. At the same time, his music became both harmonically and melodically simpler in his writing than his previous serial compositions. Three primary musical influences also became apparent in his compositional style: Polish folksong, Catholic chant and the Polish music of the past, primarily the works of Karol Szymanowski. Out of these influences evolved two compositional kernels in Górecki's music: Górecki's "motto" motif (a rise of a minor third, usually on the first three pitches of the Aeolian or Dorian scales); and the "Skierkowski turn" (the Górecki motto followed by a descending half-step) named for the Polish folk music collector who influenced the music of Karol Szymanowski. Górecki's motto and turn are found throughout the Beatus Vir Psalm. Two examples are in the baritone in the Lento section beginning at measure 123 and in the final Molto Lento section in the upper instruments of the orchestra beginning in measure 541. The repetitive nature of the melodic writing throughout the Beatus Vir Psalm is a direct descendant of the chant-like responses sung in Catholic churches.
