= List of Polish composers =

This is a list of notable and representative Polish composers.

Note: This list should contain notable composers, best with an existing article on Wikipedia. If a notable Polish composer is missing and without an article, please add the name here.

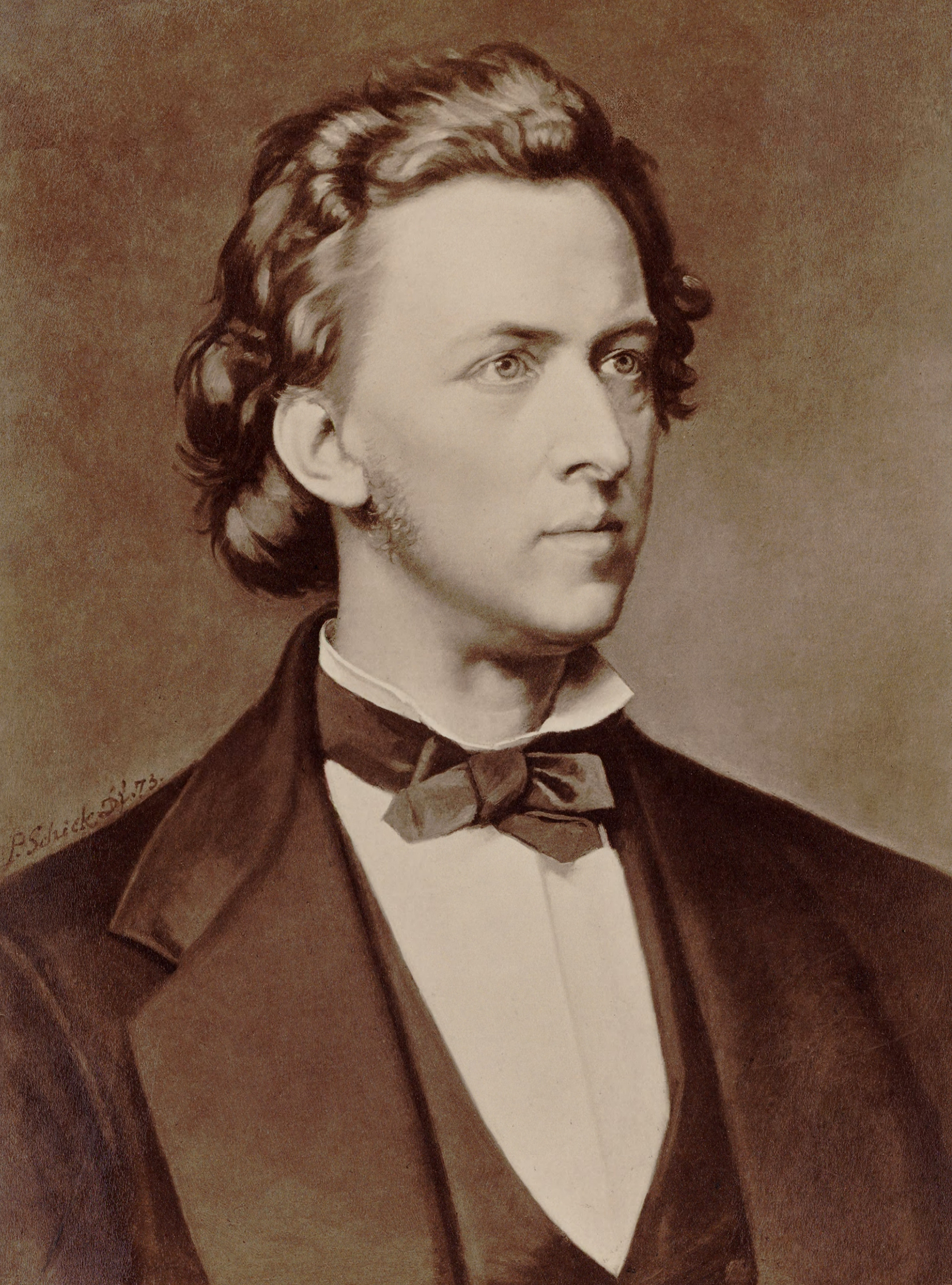
Frédéric Chopin

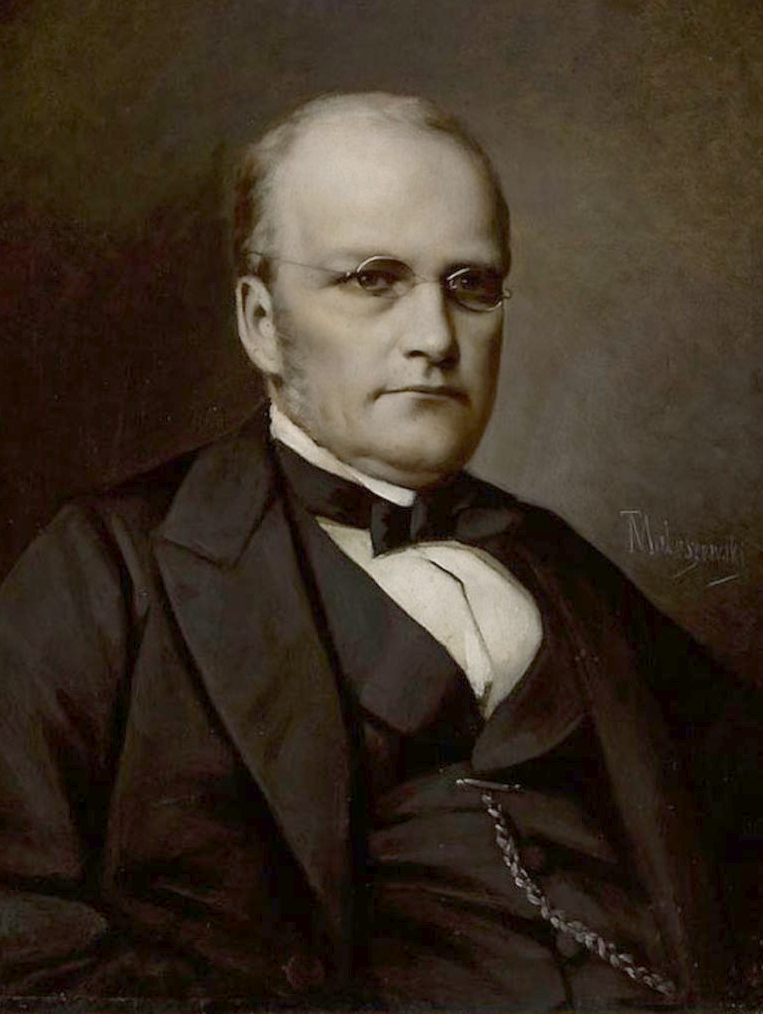
Stanisław Moniuszko

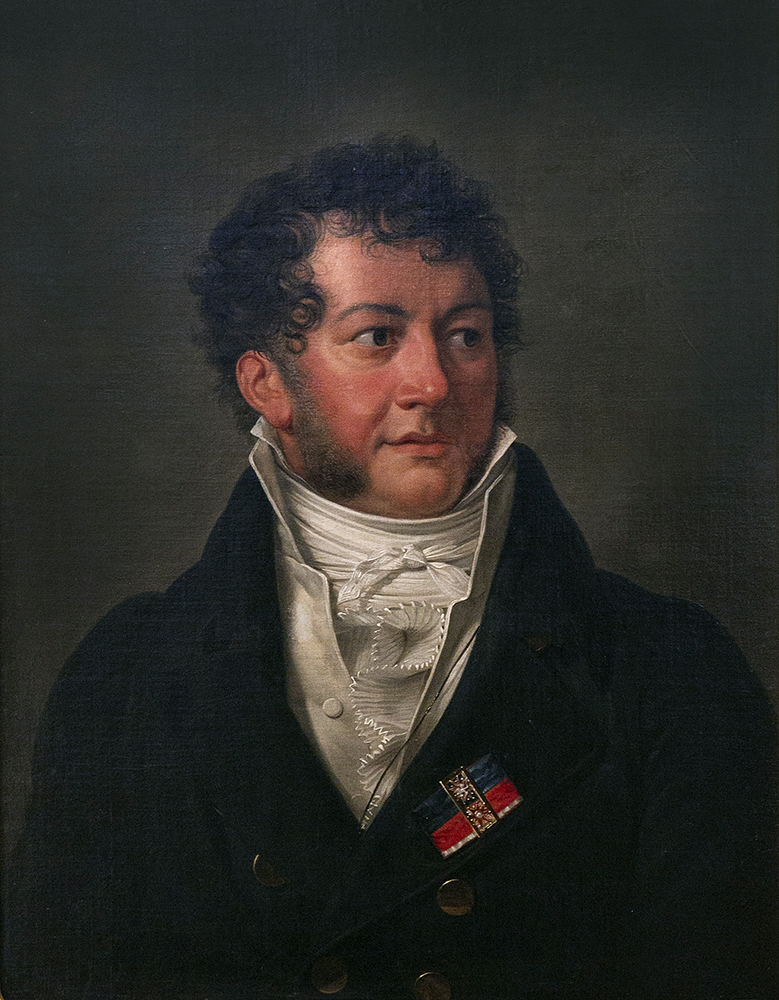
Michał Kleofas Ogiński

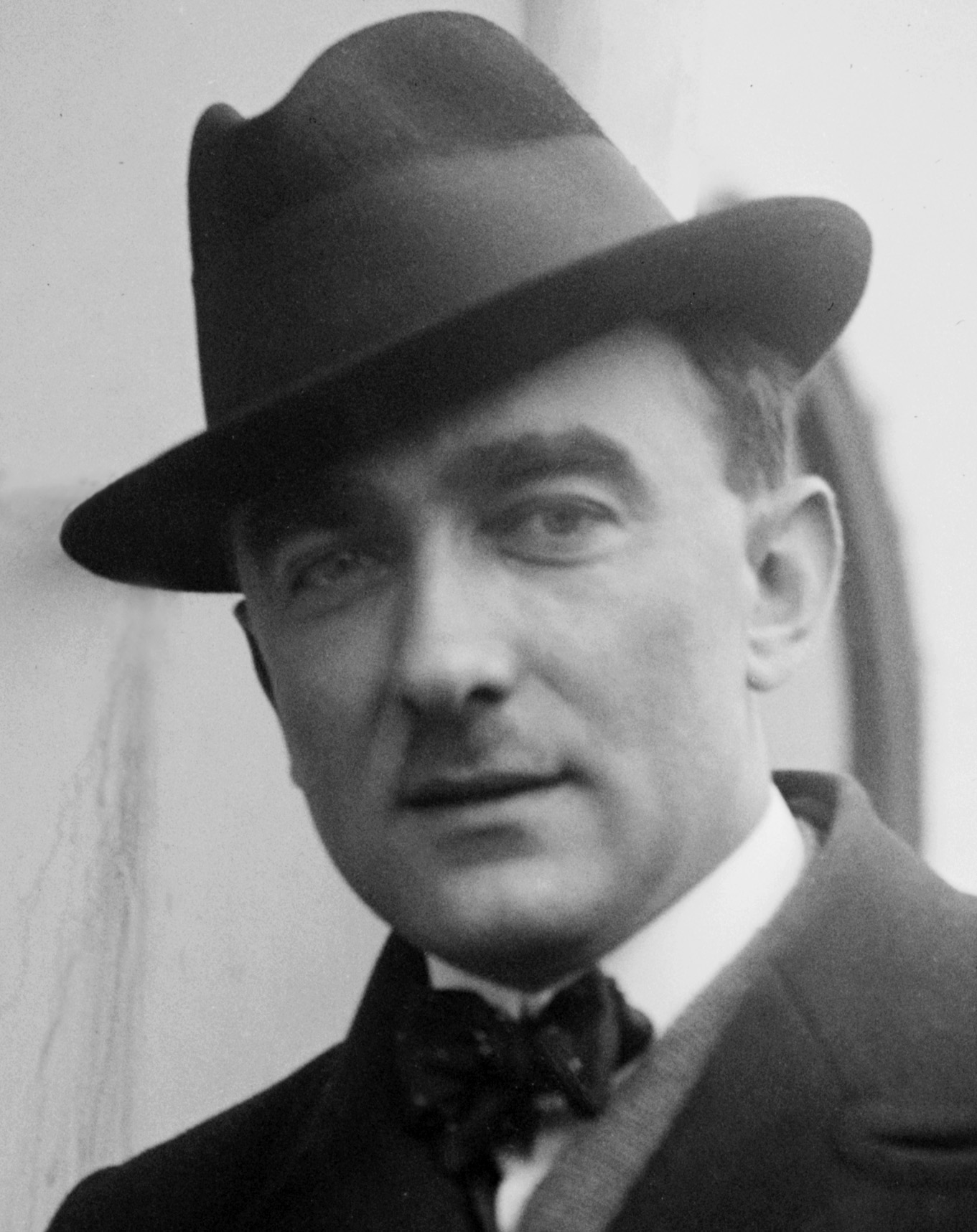
Karol Szymanowski

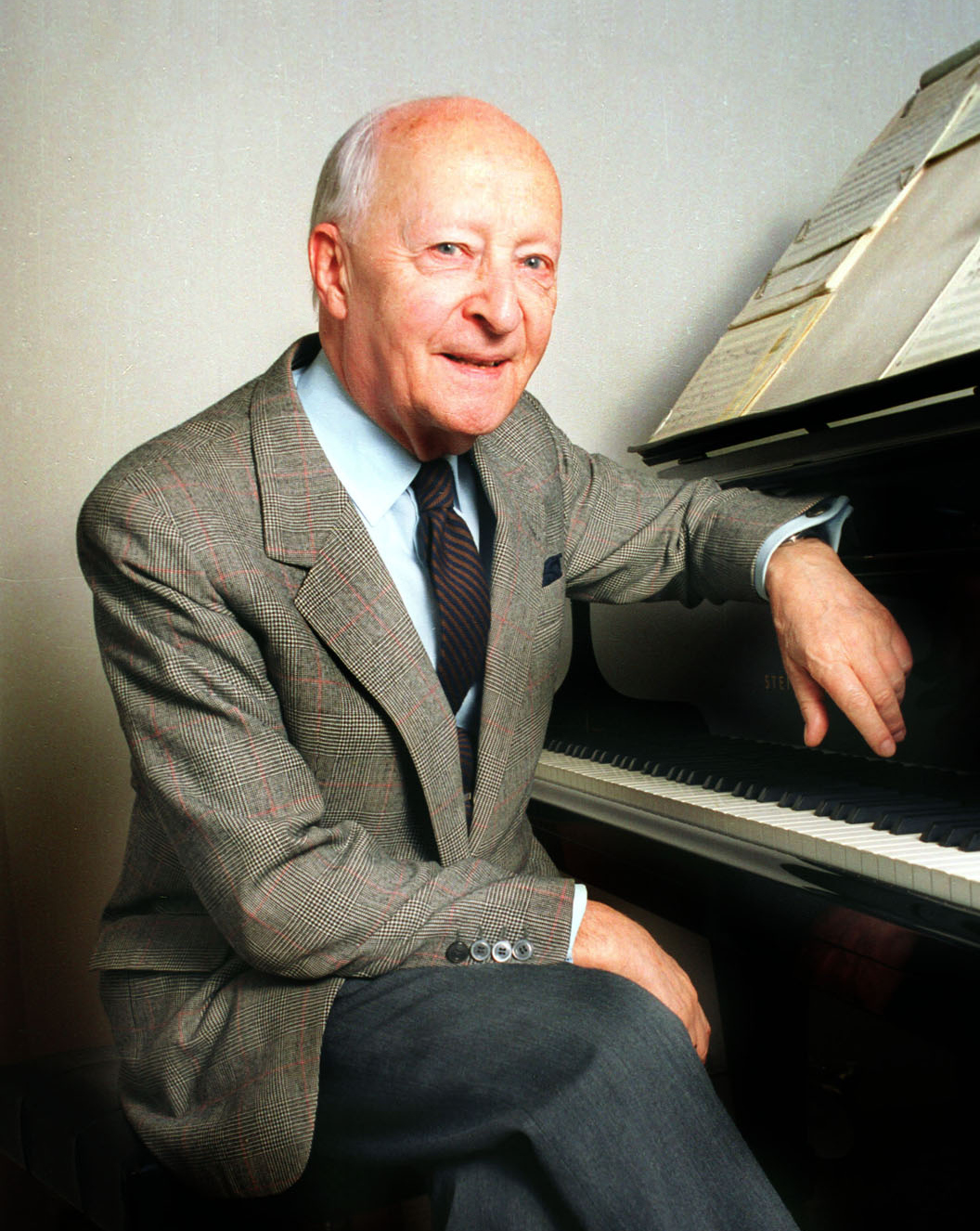
Witold Lutosławski

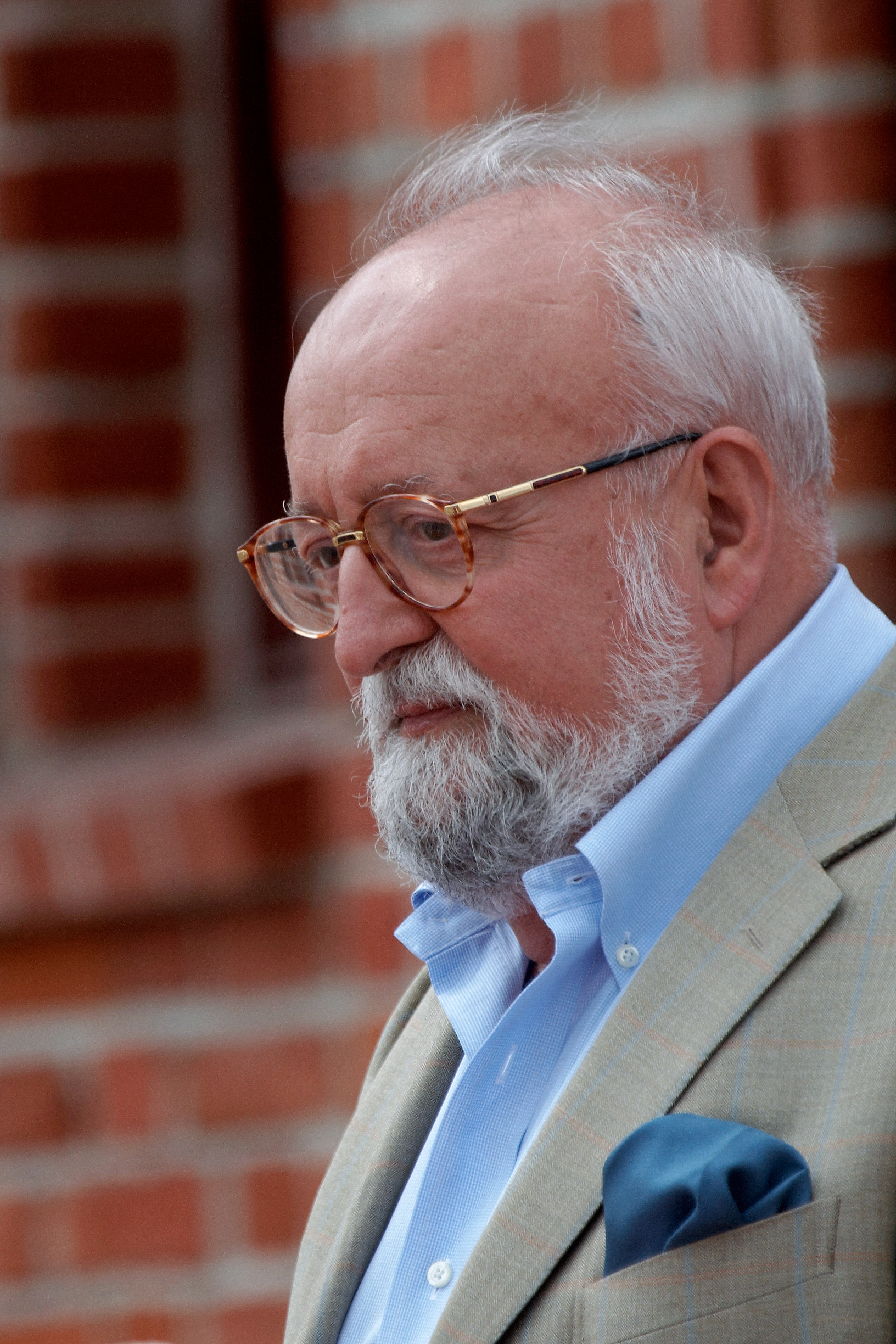
Krzysztof Penderecki

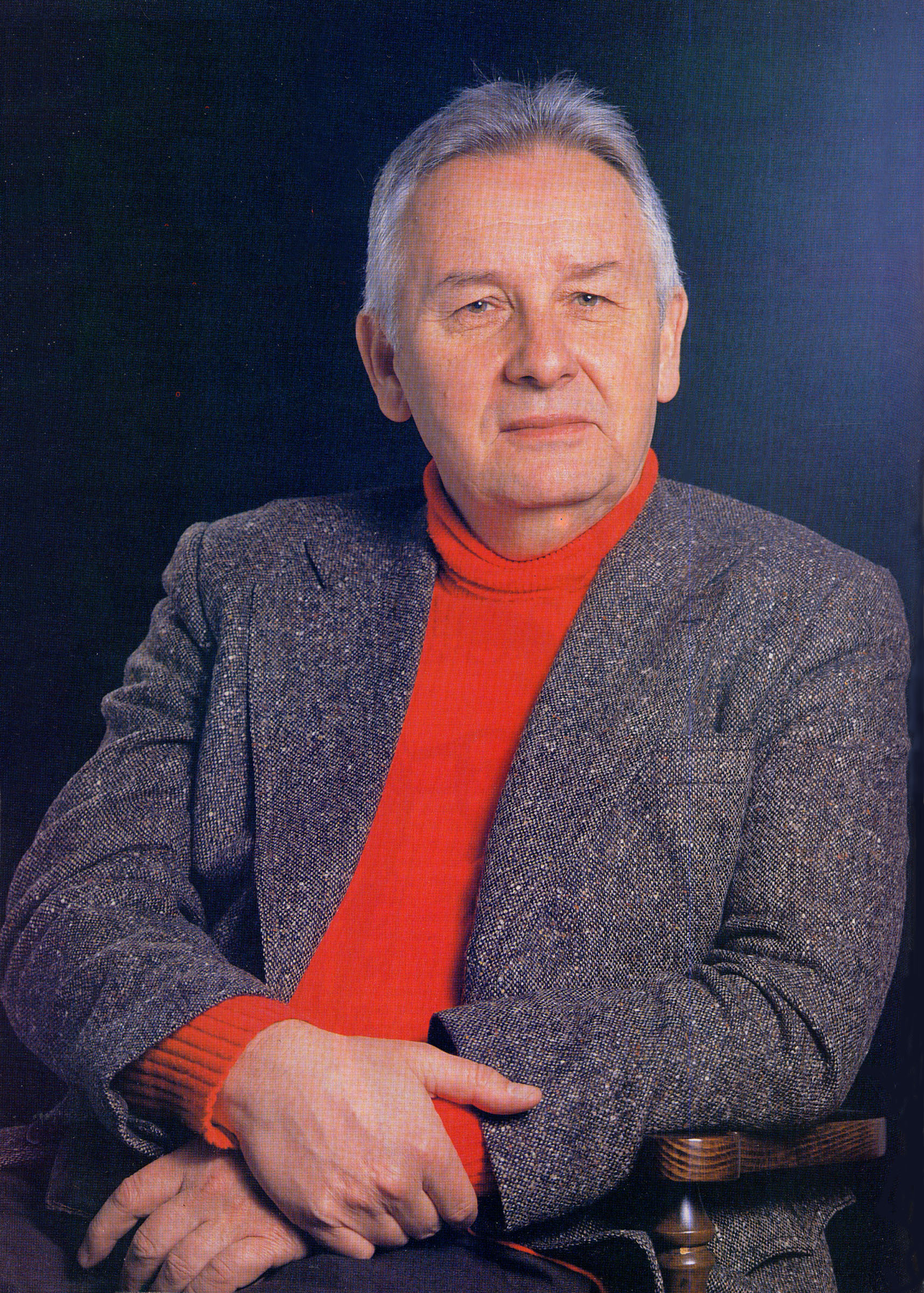
Henryk Górecki

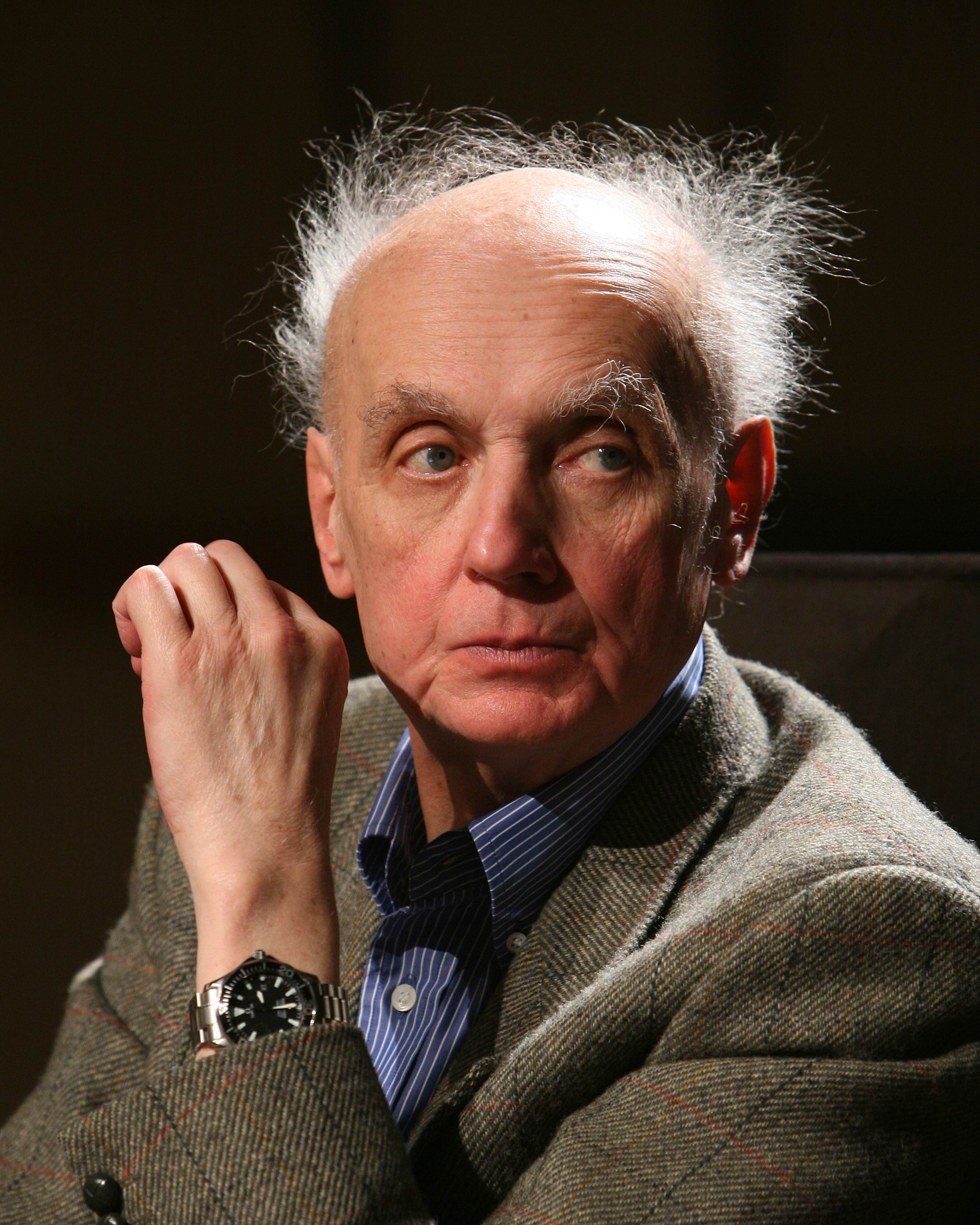
Wojciech Kilar

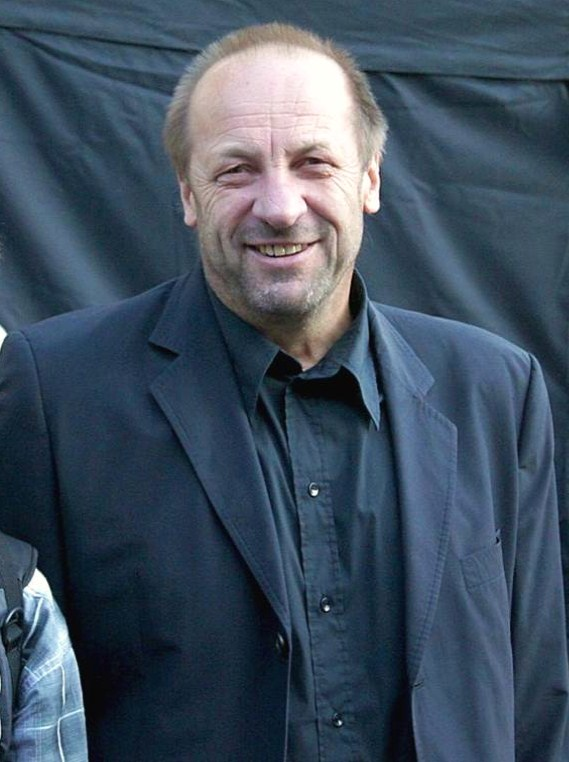
Zbigniew Preisner

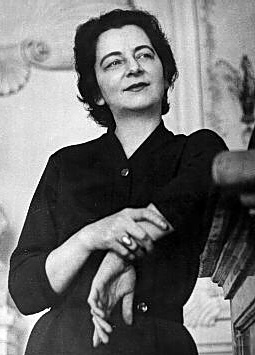
Grażyna Bacewicz

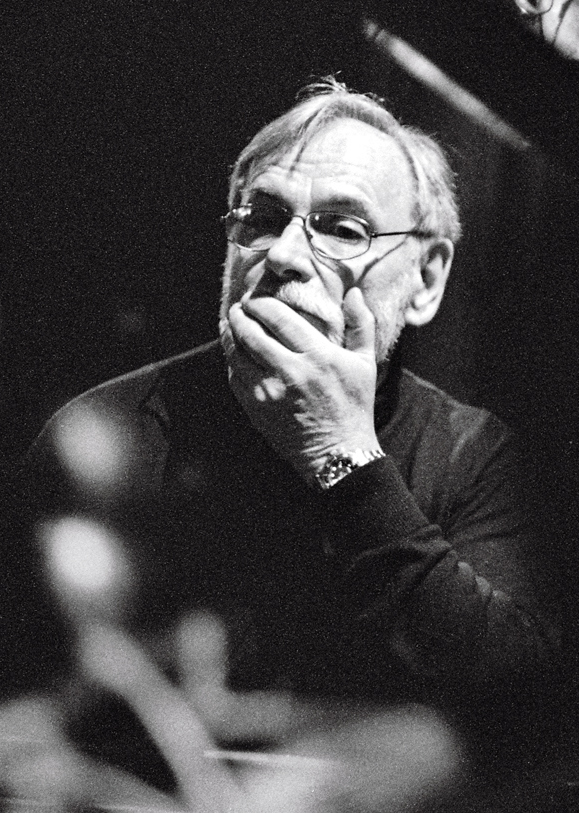
Andrzej Kurylewicz

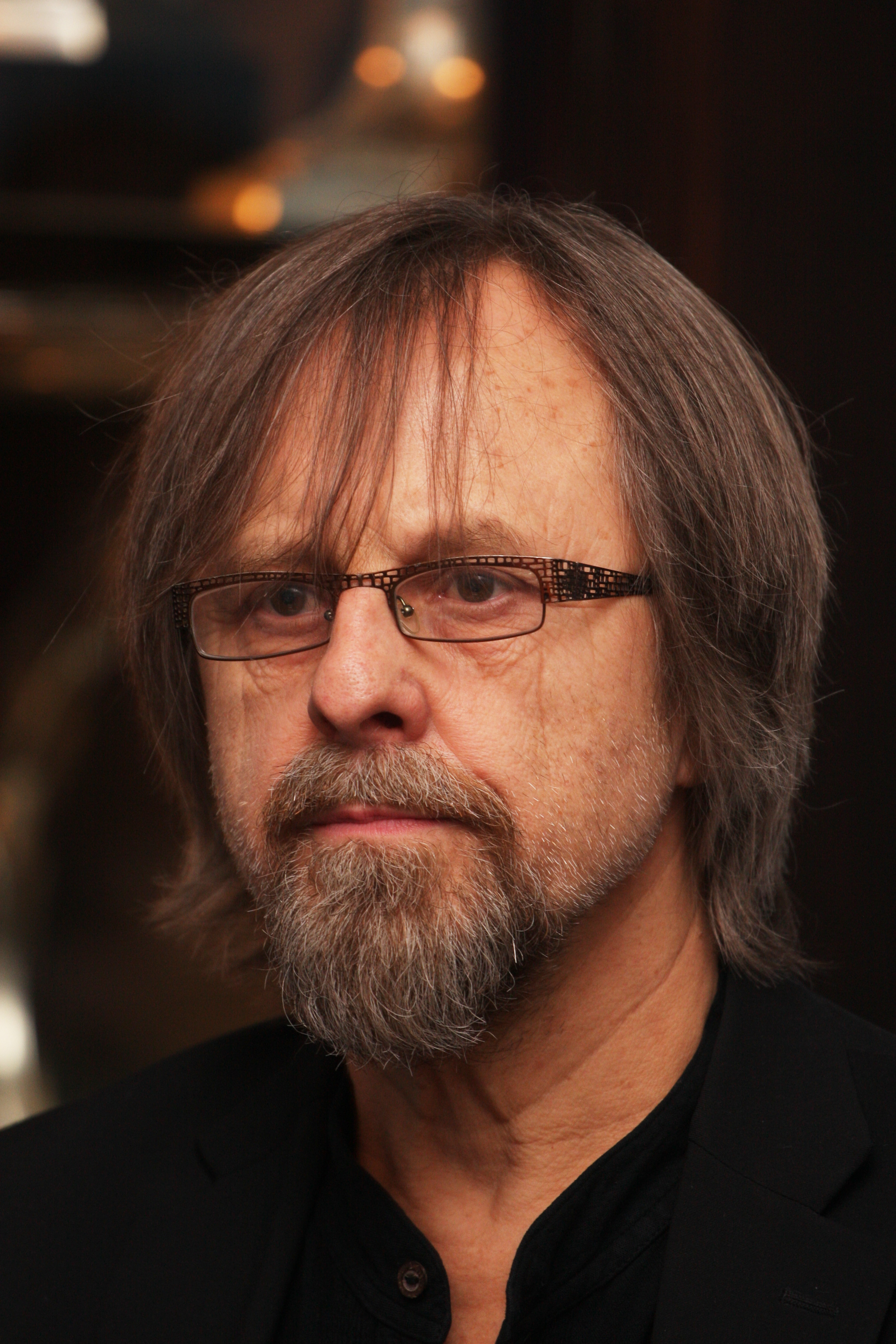
Jan A. P. Kaczmarek

== Middle Ages ==
- Wincenty z Kielczy (before 1200 – c. 1261)
- Mikołaj z Radomia (15th century)
- Piotr z Grudziądza (c. 1400 – c. 1480)

== Renaissance ==
- Sebastian z Felsztyna (c. 1480/1490 – after 1543)
- Nicolaus Cracoviensis (1st half of the 16th century)
- Wacław z Szamotuł (c. 1526 – 1560)
- Mikołaj Gomółka (1535–1591)
- Marcin Leopolita (c. 1540 – c.1589)
- Cyprian Bazylik (c.1535 – c. 1600)
- Jan z Lublina (late 15th century – 1540)
- Jakub Polak (1540–1605)
- Sebastian Klonowic (c. 1545 – 1602)
- Krzysztof Klabon (c. 1550 – after 1616)
- Wojciech Długoraj (1557–1619)
- Diomedes Cato (c. 1570 – c. 1603)

== Baroque ==
- Mikołaj Zieleński (1st half of the 17th century)
- Andreas Chyliński (c. 1590 - c. 1635)
- Adam Jarzębski (c. 1590 – 1649)
- Franciszek Lilius (c. 1600 – 1657)
- Marcin Mielczewski (c. 1600–1651)
- Bartłomiej Pękiel (c. 1600 – c. 1670)
- Jacek Różycki (1625/35 – 1703/04)
- Damian Stachowicz (1658 - 1699)
- Andrzej Siewiński (died by 1726)
- Grzegorz Gerwazy Gorczycki (1665/67 – 1734)
- Stanisław Sylwester Szarzyński (c. 1670 - c. 1713)

== 18th and 19th centuries ==
- Michał Kazimierz Ogiński (1728–1800)
- Jakub Gołąbek (1739-1789)
- Bazyli Bohdanowicz (1740–1817)
- Jan Stefani (1746–1829)
- Maciej Radziwiłł (1749–1800)
- Wojciech Żywny (1756–1842)
- Feliks Janiewicz (1762–1848)
- Michał Kleofas Ogiński (1765–1833)
- Ludwig-Wilhelm Tepper de Ferguson (1768–1838)
- Józef Ksawery Elsner (1769–1854)
- Franciszek Lessel (1780–1838)
- Franciszek Ścigalski (1782–1846)
- Karol Kurpiński (1785–1857)
- Maria Szymanowska (1789–1831)
- Karol Lipiński (1790–1861)
- Franciszek Mirecki (1791–1862)
- Feliks Horecki (1796–1870)
- Eduard Sobolewski (1804–1872)
- Jan Nepomucen Bobrowicz (1805–1881)
- Ignacy Feliks Dobrzyński (1807–1867)
- Mateusz Rudkowski (1809–1887)
- Julian Fontana (1810–1869)
- Fryderyk Chopin (1810–1849)
- Józef Władysław Krogulski (1815–1842)
- Stanisław Moniuszko (1819–1872)
- Michał Bergson (1820–1898)
- Ignacy Krzyżanowski (1826–1905)
- Tekla Bądarzewska-Baranowska (1829–1861)
- Theodor Leschetizky (1830–1915)
- Henryk Wieniawski (1835–1880)
- Józef Wieniawski (1837–1912)
- Władysław Żeleński (1837–1921)
- Carl Tausig (1841–1871)
- Zygmunt Noskowski (1846–1909)
- Ludwig Philipp Scharwenka (1847–1917)
- Xaver Scharwenka (1850–1924)
- Józef Pławiński (1853–1880)
- Maurycy Moszkowski (1854–1925)
- Juliusz Zarębski (1854–1885)

== 20th century and contemporary ==
- Aleksander Michałowski (1851–1938)
- Natalia Janotha (1856–1932)
- Timothee Adamowski (1858–1943)
- Konstanty Gorski (1859–1924)
- Roman Statkowski (1859–1925)
- Moriz Rosenthal (1862–1946)
- Ignacy Jan Paderewski (1864–1941)
- Otton Mieczysław Żukowski (1867–1942)
- Halina Krzyżanowska (1867–1937)
- Leopold Godowsky (1870–1938)
- Ignaz Friedman (1882–1948)
- Wiktor Łabuński (1895–1974)
- Emil Młynarski (1870–1935)
- Zygmunt Denis Antoni Jordan de Stojowski (1870–1946)
- Witold Maliszewski (1873–1939)
- Josef Hofmann (1876–1957)
- Mieczysław Karłowicz (1876–1909)
- Feliks Nowowiejski (1877–1946)
- Grzegorz Fitelberg (1879–1953)
- Karol Szymanowski (1882–1937)
- Ludomir Różycki (1883–1953)
- Apolinary Szeluto (1884–1966)
- Anna Maria Klechniowska (1888–1973)
- Jerzy Petersburski (1895–1979)
- Józef Koffler (1896–1944)
- Bolesław Szabelski (1896–1979)
- Tadeusz Szeligowski (1896–1963)
- Zygmunt Białostocki (1897–1942)
- Alexandre Tansman (1897–1986)
- Bolesław Woytowicz (1899–1980)
- Alexander Lipsky (1900–1985)
- Kazimierz Wiłkomirski (1900–1995)
- Simon Laks (1901–1983)
- Bronisław Kaper (1902–1983)
- Henryk Wars (1902–1977)
- Roman Palester (1907–1989)
- Zbigniew Turski (1908–1979)
- Grażyna Bacewicz (1909–1969)
- Roman Maciejewski (1910–1998)
- Stefan Kisielewski (1911–1991)
- Władysław Szpilman (1911–2000)
- Irena Pfeiffer (1912–1996)
- Witold Lutosławski (1913–1994)
- Witold Rudziński (1913–2004)
- Daniel Sternberg (1913–2000)
- Jerzy Wasowski (1913–1984)
- Andrzej Panufnik (1914–1991)
- Edward Olearczyk (1915–1994)
- Mieczysław Weinberg (1919–1996)
- Janina Skowronska (1920–1992)
- Witold Silewicz (1921–2007)
- Kazimierz Serocki (1922–1981)
- Henryk Czyż (1923–2003)
- Krystyna Moszumańska-Nazar (1924–2009)
- Włodzimierz Kotoński (1925–2014)
- Witold Szalonek (1927–2001)
- Tadeusz Baird (1928–1981)
- Josima Feldschuh (1929–1943)
- Bogusław Schaeffer (1929–2019)
- Józef Świder (1930–2014)
- Krzysztof Komeda (1931–1969)
- Andrzej Kurylewicz (1932–2007)
- Wojciech Kilar (1932–2013)
- Henryk Górecki (1933–2010)
- Krzysztof Penderecki (1933–2020)
- Marian Borkowski (born 1934)
- Aleksander Szeligowski (1934–1993)
- André Tchaikowsky (1935–1982)
- Marek Stachowski (1936–2004)
- Marian Sawa (1937–2005)
- Zygmunt Konieczny (born 1937)
- Zbigniew Bargielski (born 1937)
- Zygmunt Krauze (born 1938)
- Tomasz Sikorski (1939–1988)
- Andrzej Korzyński (born 1940)
- Krzysztof Meyer (born 1943)
- Joanna Bruzdowicz (born 1943)
- Marta Ptaszyńska (born 1943)
- Elżbieta Sikora (born 1943)
- Paweł Łukaszewski (born 1945)
- Grażyna Pstrokońska-Nawratil (born 1947)
- Andrzej Krzanowski (1951–1990)
- Eugeniusz Knapik (born 1951)
- Aleksander Lasoń (born 1951)
- Rafał Augustyn (born 1951)
- Grażyna Krzanowska (born 1952)
- Jan A. P. Kaczmarek (1953-2024)
- Krzesimir Dębski (born 1953)
- Paweł Szymański (born 1954)
- Zbigniew Preisner (born 1955)
- Zbigniew Karkowski (1958–2013)
- Piotr Moss (born 1949)
- Michał Lorenc (born 1955)
- Jan Pogány (born 1960)
- Hanna Kulenty (born 1961)
- Bettina Skrzypczak (born 1962)
- Paweł Łukaszewski (born 1968)
- Piotr Rubik (born 1968)
- Paweł Mykietyn (born 1971)
- Maciej Zieliński (born 1971)
- Marcel Chyrzyński (born 1971)
- Abel Korzeniowski (born 1972)
- Adam Sztaba (born 1975)
- Kasia Glowicka (born 1977)
- Aleksandra Gryka (born 1977)
- Marcin Stańczyk (born 1977)
- Agata Zubel (born 1978)
- Klaudia Pasternak (born 1980)
- Jagoda Szmytka (born 1982)
- Hania Rani (born 1990)

== See also ==
- List of Polish people
- Music of Poland
