= Manfred Cordes =

German conductor

- Born: 1953 (age 72–73)
- Occupations: Conductor; Musicologist; Academic teacher
- Organizations: Weser Renaissance Bremen; Hochschule für Künste Bremen

Manfred Cordes (born 1953) is a German conductor of early music, musicologist and teacher. He is professor at the Hochschule für Künste Bremen and was its rector from 2007 to 2012.

== Publications ==
- Die lateinischen Motetten des Iacobus Regnart im Spiegel der Tonarten- und Affektenlehre des 16. Jahrhunderts. University of Bremen 1991 (Dissertation)
- Pian e forte. Hauschild, Bremen 1998; ISBN 3-931785-78-5
- Nicola Vicentinos Enharmonik. (Book+CD), Akademische Druck- und Verlags-Anstalt, Graz/Austria, 2007; ISBN 978-3-201-01884-5

== Discography ==
Extensive discography with his ensemble Weser-Renaissance on the CPO label.

- The Spirit of the Renaissance Works from Josquin des Prez to Hans Leo Hassler cpo 999 294-2 (1993)
- Thomas Stoltzer (1480–1526) Missa duplex per totum annum; 3 Psalm Motets cpo 999 295-2 (1994)
- Hanseatische Festmusiken um 1600 – Wedding motets by Julius Johannes Weiland, Julius Ernst Rautenstein, Heinrich Albert, Andreas Hakenberger, Philipp Dulichius, Christoph Bernhard, Dietrich Becker, Matthias Weckmann, Jacob Obrecht, Lassus, Andries Pevernage, Clemens non Papa. cpo 999 396-2 (1995)
- Leonhard Lechner (1553–1606) Newe Teutsche Lieder (1577) cpo 999 370-2 (1995)
- Jacob Praetorius II (1586–1651) Motets and Organ Works cpo 999 215-2 (1995)
- Camilla de Rossi (fl.1700) Il Sacrifizio di Abramo – The Sacrifice of Abraham, Oratorio cpo 999 371-2 (1995) leider zur Zeit vergriffen
- Heinrich Schütz – Cantiones sacrae 1625 op. 4 Complete 40 Motets SWV 53–93 cpo 999 405-2 (1995) 2CD
- Cipriano de Rore – Sacred and Secular Motets from the Munich Codex cpo 999 506-2 (1996)
- Johann Theile (1646–1724) Psalm Motets (Psalm 111, 6 & 4) Missa (Kyrie, Gloria), Sonata duplex à 3 Cpo 999 489-2 (1996)
- Jacob Regnart – Mariale 1588 Fifteen Marian Motets cpo 999 507-2 (1996)
- Heinrich Schütz – Geistliche Chor-Music 1648 SWV 369–397 Complete recording of the 29 motets, 116. Psalm SWV 51 Litania SWV 458 cpo 999 546-2 (1997) 2CD
- Heinrich Schütz – Secular Works cpo 999 518-2 (1997)
- Friedens-Seufftzer und Jubel-Geschrey – Musik für Den Westfälischen Frieden. Johannes Schop, Heinrich Albert, Johann Andreas Herbst, Michael Jacobi, Andreas Hammerschmidt, Schütz, Sophie-Elisabeth von Braunschweig-Wolfenbüttel (1613–1676), Johann Stobäus, Johann Erasmus Kindermann, Johann Werlin, Johann Staden, Sigmund Theophil Staden, Vicentz Rupffenbart, Melchior Franck, Adam Drese, Johann Müller, Johann Hildebrand, Erasmus Widmann, Andreas Berger. cpo 999 571-2 (1997)
- Andrea Gabrieli – Madrigali e Canzoni cpo 999 642-2 (1998)
- Hieronymus Praetorius – Vesper for St.Michael's Day cpo 999 649-2 (1999)
- Heinrich Schütz – Kleine geistliche Konzerte cpo 999 675-2 (1999) 3CD
- Ludwig Senfl – Deutsche Lieder, Carmina cpo 999 648-2 (1999)
- Hans Leo Hassler – Cantate Domino Motetten und Orgelwerke cpo 999 723-2 (2000)
- Andreas Hammerschmidt – Kirchen und Tafelmusik 1662 cpo 999 846-2 (2003)
- Johann Hermann Schein – Israelsbrünnlein cpo 999 959-2 (2004) 2CD
- Heinrich Schütz – Historia der Auferstehung Jesu Christi cpo 777 027-2 (2005)
- Lassus – Vesperae Beatae Mariae Virginis cpo 777 182-2 (2006)
- Dietrich Buxtehude – Wacht! Euch zum Streit gefasset macht” Jüngstes Gericht cpo 777 197-2 (2007) excerpts
- Melchior Franck – Psalmi poenitentiales Deutsche Bußpsalmen 1615 cpo 777 181-2 (2007)
- Hieronymus Praetorius – San Marco in Hamburg cpo 777 245-2 (2007)
- Telemann – Bürger-Capitäns-Musik 1744 cpo 777 390-2 (2008) 2CD
- Thomas Selle – Die Auferstehung Christi. Ostermusik cpo 777 396-2 (2008)
- Heinrich Schütz – Musicalische Exequien, Psalmen SWV 24, 25, 148, 200, 248 (Bußpsalmen) from the Beckerpsalter. cpo 2521641 (2010)
- Lassus – Prophetiae Sibyllarum and Christmas motets. cpo 2247016 (2010)
- Baroque Christmas in Hamburg – H. Praetorius, Thomas Selle, Scheidemann, Weckmann, Scheidt, Förtsch, Bernhard – With the Bremer Barock Consort CPO 2010
- Josquin des Prez – Missa Ave maris stella, Marian motets (2011)
- Michael Praetorius – Ostermesse 1569, 2011, including works from the 1611 Missodia Sionia
- Philipp Dulichius – Motets, 2012
- Josquin des Prez – Psalm motets, 2012
- Johann Grabbe – Madrigals, 2012
- Augustin Pfleger – Laudate Dominum – Sacred Cantatas. Hofkapellemeister an Schloss Gottorf I. 2013
- Tafel Consort – Musik an den Höfen der Weserrenaissance, Hille Perl, Lee Santana, Weser-Renaissance Bremen, Manfred
- Cristobal de Morales: "O Magnum Mysterium"
- Moritz Landgraf von Hessen: Geistliche & weltliche Werke
- Johann Philipp Förtsch Cantatas
- Virgo Prudentissima – Geistliche Musik aus Polen, Marcin Mielczewski (1600–1651), Adam Jarzebski (1590–1649), Mikolaj Zielenski (1560–1620) 2014
- Tobias Michael: Geistliche Madrigale "Seelen-Lust" 2014
- Heinrich Schütz Symphoniae sacrae I SWV 257–276 Venice 1629, 2015
- Georg Österreich Psalmen und Kantaten
- Michael Praetorius Lutherische Choralkonzerte
- Sebastian Knüpfer: Geistliche Konzerte, 2016
- Giacomo Carissimi – Oratorios Historia Ionae; Historia di Iob; Oratorio di Daniele Profeta; Historia de Ezechia
- Johann Walter: Geystliches Gesangk Buchleyn (1524/1525)
- Hieronymus Praetorius: Missa in Festo Sanctissimae Trinitatis 2018
- Johann Rosenmüller: Geistliche Konzerte auf Psalm 31 "In te Domine speravi" – seven settings
- Giovanni de Macque: Madrigali de cinque voci Libro sesto (Venice 1613)
- Daniel Selichius Geistliche Konzerte "Opus novum" (Wolfenbüttel 1623/24) 2019
