= Ars Nova (Polish ensemble) =

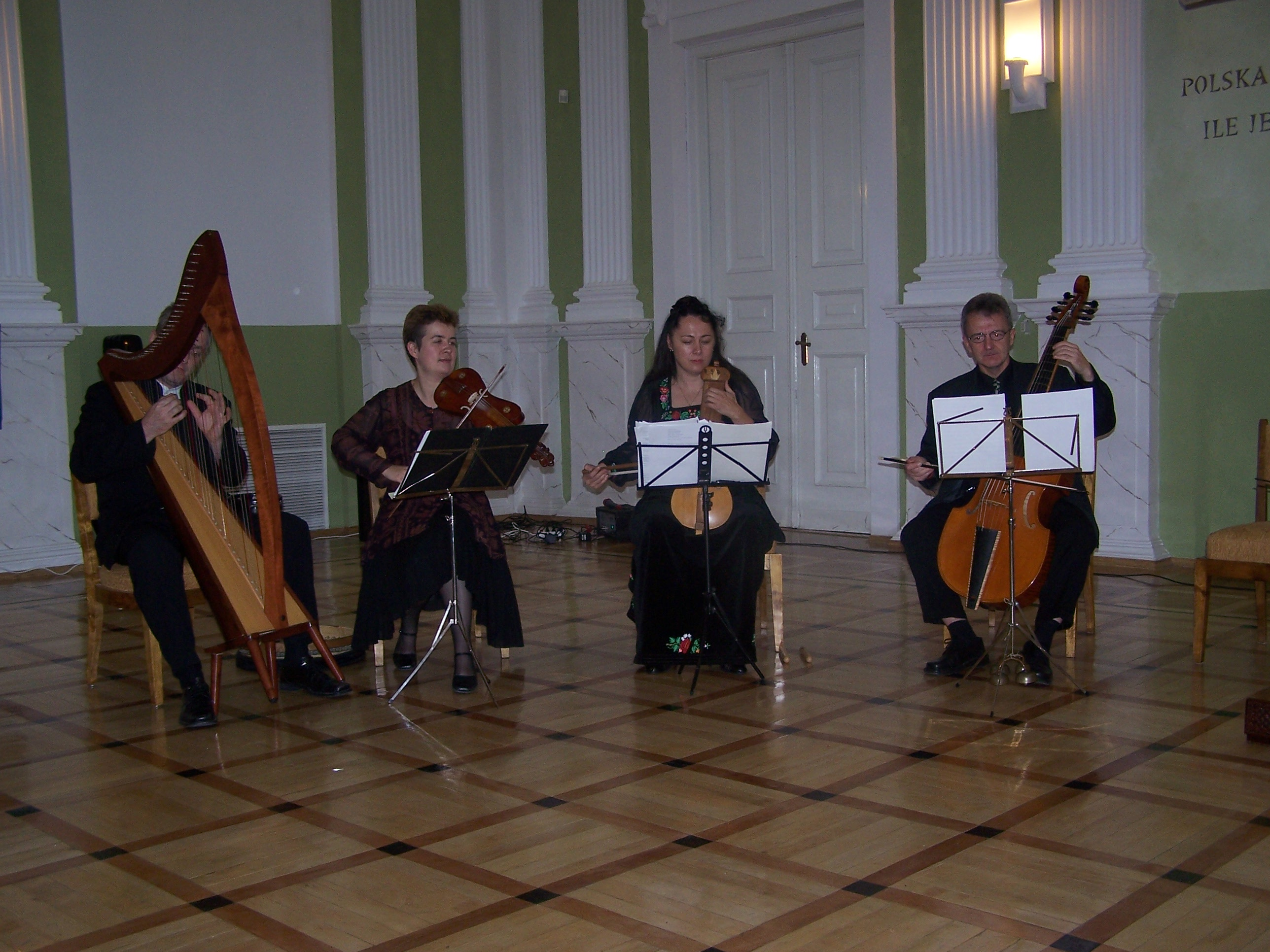
The Early music ensemble "Ars Nova" - Celtic harp, vielle, rebec and viola da gamba - at the Polish festival 'Przyjechał Kurpś do Warsiawy'

Ars Nova is a Polish early music instrumental ensemble founded in Warsaw in 1981 by Jacek Urbaniak.

The instrumental ensemble has cooperated with other Polish early music ensembles such as Il Canto, Collegium Vocale Bydgoszcz, and others.

== Discography ==
- Musique a la chapelle des Jagiellons, works by Mikołaj z Radomia and Jan z Jasiennej. Ars Nova 1990, Accord (French record label), Paris
- Piotr of Grudziądz Petrus de Grudziądz Chansons et Motets, Bornus Consort, Ars Nova, 1991, Accord, Paris
- El Llibre Vermell, 1991, JAM, Warsaw
- Mikołaj z Radomia, 1995, DUX, Warsaw (nominated for Fryderyk 1995)
- Muzyka na Wawelu, Music On Wawel Castle - Ars Nova, Urbaniak. 1995, DUX, Warsaw (nominated for Fryderyk 1995)
- Zaświeć niesiundzu, 1996, DUX, Warsaw
- Mikołaj Gomółka Melodie na psałterz polski. Psalms settings on psalm paraphrases of Jan Kochanowski, 1996, DUX, Warsaw (winner of the Fryderyk 1996)
- W Dzień Bożego Narodzenia, soloist Łucja Prus, 1996, Polnet, Warsaw
- Millenium Sancti Adalberti-Wojciechi, 1997, Polskie Radio, Warsaw
- Bogurodzica - hymns sequences and polyphonic music of the Polish Middle Ages, Anna Mikolajczyk (soprano), Robert Lawaty (counter-tenor), Cezary Szyfman (baritone) Ars Nova, Jacek Urbaniak 1997, Tonpress, Warsaw
- Pieśni sefardyjskie, Sephardic songs, soloist J. T. Stępień, 1997, ZPR Records, Warsaw
- Romantyczność - w 150. rocznicę śmierci Adama Mickiewicza, 1998, Radio Białystok, DUX
- Andrzej Hiolski śpiewa kolędy, pl:Andrzej Hiolski sings carols 1998, Silva Rerum, Warsaw
- Muzyka Jagiellonów - rękopis Krasińskich XV w., 2001, Travers, Warsaw
- Anatomia Kobyły - Anatomy of a Mare - popular songs about horses, 2002, Travers, Warszawa (Nominated Fryderyk 2003)
- Muzyka Piastów Śląskich XIII-XV w., Music of the Silesian Piasts 2004, Travers, Warsaw
- Rudolphina - skarby Legnicy XVI/XVII w., Treasures of Legnica; composers including Hassler, Ars Nova, Subtilior Ensemble and Urbaniak 2004, DUX, Warsaw
- Jezusa Judasz przedał - Polish passion play music, with Collegium Vocale Bydgoszcz 2004, DUX, Warsaw
- Cornelis Schuyt: Renaissance dances of the Netherlands, 1611, 2004, Travers, Warszawa
- Muzyka Polskiego Średniowiecza, 2006 Travers, Warsaw
- Muzyka Polskiego Renesansu, 2007 Travers, Warsaw
- O cudownych uzdrowieniach Of miraculous healings, Cantigas de Santa Maria, estampies, 2008 Travers, Warsaw
- Sebastian Klonowic: Hebdomas 10 songs. 2010 (CD attached to book) Neriton, Warsaw
- Tabulatura Warszawskiego Towarzystwa Muzycznego (zwana też tabulaturą łowicką) 16th century, 2010 Travers, Warsaw
- Cyprian Bazylik: complete works, 2012 Travers, Sieradzkie Centrum Kultury, 2014 Acte Prealable
