= Marcin Leopolita =

Polish composer (1537 – c. 1584)

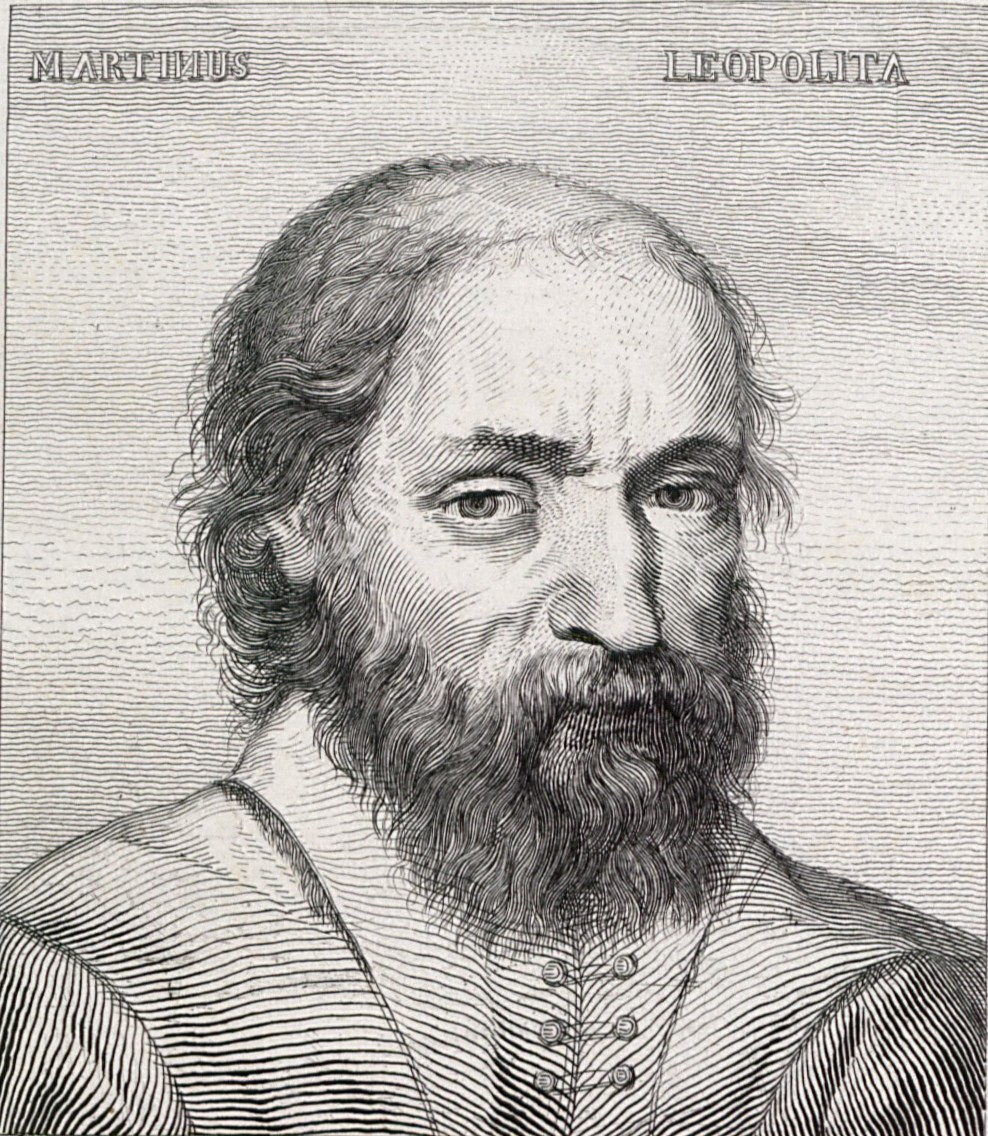
An engraving of Marcin Leopolita by Antoni Oleszczyński, National Library of Poland (1832)

Marcin Leopolita (also Martinus Leopolita; Polish: Marcin ze Lwowa; 1537 – c. 1584) was one of the most eminent Polish (Note: Attributed to the following sources:) composers of the 16th century. He attended the Jagiellonian University (Collegium Maius) and may have studied under the Polish composer Sebastian z Felsztyna and Jan Jelen of Tuchola.

== Life ==
Leopolita was born in Lwów in the Kingdom of Poland (present-day Lviv, Ukraine). By the age of 20 he was a member of the royal music ensemble at the court of Zygmunt August, King of Poland and Grand Duke of Lithuania. apparently becoming court composer there in 1560. After 1564, he returned to Lviv, where he lived until his death in 1589.

Few compositions by Leopolita have survived. Four motets written in Latin (Cibavit eos, Mihi autem, Resurgente Christo and Spiritus Domini) are preserved in organ tablature. Of these, Cibavit Eos can be restored with confidence to its original vocal form. All four works are known from a single source, a tablature formerly belonging to the Warsaw Musicological Society which now only survives as a photographic copy, the original having been destroyed during the Second World War. This tablature was probably written around 1580 and has been known as the Tablature of Martin Leopolita, although while Leopolita himself was an organist, his connection with the manuscript is uncertain.

Leopolita's five-part mass Missa paschalis is the only complete exant 16th-century Polish mass, and the Agnus Dei, which adds a sixth voice (a second Cantus) has the distinction of being the earliest extant example of six-part Polish polyphony. It is based on themes from four Polish vernacular Easter songs—hence the designation 'Paschalis'—of which Chrystus Pan zmartwychwstał is the most prominent.

== Recordings ==
- Early Polish Masses Gorczycki: Missa Paschalis Leopolita: Missa Paschalis Mielczewski: Missa super "O Gloriosa Domina" Jaroslaw Malanowicz (organ) Il Canto CD Accord - ACD018
- Waclaw z Szamotul: Songs and Motets and Leopolita: Missa Paschalis Collegium Vocale Bydgoszcz Dux - DUX0248 recorded 1992 and 1994
