= John Eaton (pianist) =

American pianist (1934–2026)

Background information
- Born: John Livingston Eaton; May 29, 1934; Washington D.C., U.S.
- Died: May 24, 2026 (aged 91)
- Genres: Jazz, American standards
- Occupations: Pianist, musicologist, humorist
- Instrument: Piano
- Website: http://www.eatonpiano.com/

John Livingston Eaton (May 29, 1934 – May 24, 2026) was an American pianist, musicologist, humorist, educator, and interpreter of jazz and American popular music. He is "considered one of the foremost interpreters of American music."

== Early life and education ==
Eaton was born in Washington, D.C. He first learned about jazz from his father, a journalist who played the piano every evening after work.

He attended Yale University. There, he was a member of the social and literary fraternity St. Anthony Hall. He graduated from Yale in 1956. He later studied with renowned classical teacher Alexander Lipsky.

== Career ==
Eaton started playing music in the late 1950s. He played in the house trio of Blues Alley, playing with the touring stars who needed a backing band for three years. He also played piano in hotel lounges.

In 1988, he was named to the Steinway Concert Artist roster. Also in 1988, Eaton has performed as headliner in the East Room of the White House for President Reagan, and both as soloist and with artists as Zoot Sims, Benny Carter, Duke Ellington, Clark Terry, and Wild Bill Davison. He has been a featured player at the Kool Jazz Festival and the Smithsonian Institution Performing Arts Jazz series, broadcast nationally on National Public Radio and Radio Smithsonian.

Characterized by Nat Hentoff as "the complete pianist... the master of just about the whole spectrum of jazz music", Eaton is profiled in Leonard Feather and Ira Gitler's Encyclopedia of Jazz, and was reviewed by prominent music critics.

== Personal life and death ==
Eaton lived in American University Park in Washington, D.C.

He died on May 24, 2026, five days before his 92nd birthday.

== Works ==
Eaton is known for the CD series project John Eaton Presents the American Popular Song in cooperation with the Wolf Trap Foundation for the Performing Arts, the operational partner of the Wolf Trap National Park for the Performing Arts. This includes thirteen separate recorded broadcast programs in concert and conversation with jazz bassist Jay Leonhart. Each program focuses on major artists, composers or collaborators in American music, including Richard Rodgers, Harold Arlen, George Gershwin, Jerome Kern, Cole Porter, Julie Styne, Irving Berlin, Kurt Weill and Vernon Duke, and Hoagy Carmichael and Fats Waller, Duke Ellington, Harry Warren, Jimmy Van Heusen, Frank Loesser, The Beatles, and Bob Dylan.
