= Camerata Wrocław =

Camerata Wrocław is a professional chamber orchestra in Wrocław, which was founded in 1998 by the Polish conductor and composer Jan Pogány. The orchestra performs regularly in Munich, Wrocław and Dresden as well as on regular international tours. The Camerata Wrocław has a repertoire from Bach to film music.
