= Ars nova (disambiguation) =

Ars nova is a late medieval French musical style.

Ars nova may also refer to:

== Music ==
- Project Ars Nova, an American medieval musical ensemble
- Ars Nova Copenhagen, a Danish choir
- Ensemble Ars Nova, a French contemporary classical music ensemble
- Ars Nova Singers, an American choir
- Ars Nova (Polish ensemble), a Polish early music instrumental ensemble
- Ars Nova (American band), an American progressive rock band
- Ars Nova (Japanese band), a Japanese progressive rock band

== Others uses ==
- Ars nova (art), a Dutch Renaissance art movement
- Ars Nova (theater), an off-Broadway theater
- Ars Nova, a magical text related to the grimoire Ars Notoria
- Arpeggio of Blue Steel -Ars Nova-, a Japanese anime television series based on the manga series Arpeggio of Blue Steel
