= Bazylevych =

Bazylewicz coat of arms used by some of Bazylewicz family

Bazylevych (Cyrillic: Базилевич) is a Ukrainian surname. Russian equivalent: Bazilevich. Bazylewicz is a Polish-language surname meaning "son of Bazyli (Basil)". Archaic feminine forms are Bazylewiczowa (by husband), Bazylewiczówna (by father); they still can be used colloquially.

Notable people with the surname include:

- Georgy Bazilevich (1889–1939), Soviet komkor
- Oleh Bazylevych (1938–2018), Ukrainian football player and coach
- Vyacheslav Bazylevych (born 1990), Ukrainian-born Russian football goalkeeper
