= Rudkowski =

Rudkowski (feminine: Rudkowska; plural: Rudkowscy) is a surname. Notable people with the surname include:

- Mateusz Rudkowski (c. 1809 — c. 1887), Ukrainian-Polish composer
- Wiesław Rudkowski (1946–2016), Polish boxer

== Related surnames ==
Language	Masculine	Feminine
Polish	Rudkowski	Rudkowska
Belarusian (Romanization)	Рудкоўскі (Rudkoŭski, Rudkowski)	Рудкоўская (Rudkouskaya, Rudkoŭskaja, Rudkowskaya)
Czech/Slovak	Rudkovský	Rudkovská
Latvian	Rudkovskis	
Lithuanian	Rudkauskas	Rudkauskienė (married); Rudkauskaitė (unmarried)
Romanian/Moldovan	Rudcovschi, Rudcovschii	
Russian (Romanization)	Рудковский (Rudkovskiy, Rudkovskii, Rudkovskij, Rudkovsky, Rudkovski)	Рудковская (Rudkovskaya, Rudkovskaia, Rudkovskaja)
Ukrainian (Romanization)	Рудковський (Rudkovskyi, Rudkovskyy, Rudkovskyj, Rudkovsky)	Рудковська (Rudkovska)
Other	Rudkowsky, Rudkofsky	
