= Philipp Dulichius =

German composer

Philipp Dulichius (also Deulich, Deilich, Teilich, Dulich, Dulichs) (18 December 1562 – 24 March 1631) was a German composer.

== Life ==
Dulichius Philip was born in Chemnitz, where his father, Caspar Deulich, was a clothier, councillor and mayor. Of his student days it is only known for certain that he was enrolled in the University of Leipzig in 1579. In 1587 he became cantor at the Gymnasium in Stettin. Since 1618 he taught at the same Gymnasium. He was also a teacher at the Marienkirche in Stettin and at the court of the Pomeranian Duke. In 1630 he retired after 43 years of service, and he died in Stettin. The Marienkirche, where he was buried, burnt down in 1789 and was never rebuilt.

Philip Dulichius composed 232 motets, which were highly appreciated at his time and earned him the nickname of the Pomeranian Lassus. On the occasion of the Heinrich-Schütz Days in September 2004 in Greifswald a lecture was given on "Philipp Dulichius - Kantor an St. Marien und am Fürstlichen Pädagogium Stettin 1587-1631" (Philip Dulichius - cantor at St Mary's and at the Gymnasium of Stettin 1587-1631).

In Dulichius' birth town Chemnitz a memorial plaque was placed at the St Jacob's church in November 2008.

== Works ==
- Cantiones compositae, 5, 6vv (1589)
- Philomusicis omnibus et singulis dominis et amicis suis colendis hasce 4 cantiones sacras consecrat, 8vv (1590)
- Harmoniae aliquot compositae, 7vv (1593)
- 6 cantiones sacrae concinnatae, 5vv (1593)
- Novum opus musicum duarum partium, continens dicta insigniora ex evangelies … prior pars (1595)
- Fasciculus novus continens dicta insigniora ex evangelies … desumta, 5vv (1598)
- Ego flos campi: hymenaeus solennibus nuptiarum … Guilhelmi Simonis … ac … Elisabetham, 7vv (1605)
- Centuriae
  - Prima pars centuriae harmonias sacras laudibus sanctissimae triados consecratas continentis, 7, 8vv (1607)
  - Secunda pars centuriae harmonias sacras laudibus sanctissimae triados consecratas continentis, 7, 8vv (1608)
  - Tertia pars centuriae harmonias sacras laudibus sanctissimae triados consecratas continentis, 7, 8vv (1610)
  - Quarta pars centuriae harmonias sacras laudibus sanctissimae triados consecratas continentis, 7, 8vv (1612)
- Dictum psalmi XXX … cui usitata melodia cum textu germanico inserta est (1611)
- Primus tomus centuriae harmonias sacras laudibus sanctissimae triados consecratas continentis, 6vv (1630)
- Sunt piascepta Deo: carmen musicum honori nuptiarum … Udalrici ducis Megalopyrgensis … et Annae (n.p., n.d.)

== Recordings ==
- 18 motets. Weser-Renaissance, Manfred Cordes 2012

Individual works on

  - Ensemble amarcord - Nun komm der Heiden Heiland (9. Pastores loquebantur inter se), Raumklang Records, RKap 10205
  - Ensemble Villancico - The Källunge Codex 1622 (1. Exultate justi in Domino), Sjelvar Records HB, SJECD 19
  - Ensemble Weser-Renaissance Bremen - Festive Hanseatic Music (7. Omnis caro ut foenum, 8. Da pacem Domine), CPO Records, CPO 999782
  - Ensemble Weser-Renaissance Bremen - The Spirit of the Renaissance (13. Gloria Patri qui creavit nos), CPO Records, CPO 999294

== Sources ==
Walter Blankenburg's article in New Grove Dictionary of Music

- R. Schwartz: Introductions to Philippus Dulichius (1562–1631), DDT, xxxi, xli, 1907 (in German)
