= Bornus Consort =

The Bornus Consort is a Polish male vocal sextet for early music founded in 1981, and led by musicologist Marcin Bornus-Szczyciński. It was one of the first generation of early music groups in Poland.

== Discography ==
- Bartlomiej Pekiel: Audite Mortales; 3 Motets; Missa Brevis Accord (French record label) 1989
- Mikolaj Zielenski: Offertoria et Communiones Totius Anni 1996
- Media Vita: Polish Passion Songs Dux Records 1997
- Marcin Mielczewski Dux Records
