= Collegium Vocale =

Collegium Vocale may refer to:

- Collegium Vocale, nonprofit community chorus based in Atlanta, Georgia, United States.
- Collegium Vocale Bydgoszcz, early music vocal ensemble based in Bydgoszcz, Poland
- Collegium Vocale Gent, early music choir based in Ghent, Belgium
- Collegium Vocale Köln, vocal ensemble based in Köln, Germany
