= Andreas Berger =

Andreas Berger may refer to:

- Andreas Berger (athlete) (born 1961), Austrian sprinter
- Andreas Berger (composer) (1584–1656), German composer

== See also ==
- Andrea Berger (born 1970), American tennis player
