= Johann Jacob Löwe =

German Baroque composer and organist (1628 - 1703)

Johann Jacob Löwe (1628–1703) was a German Baroque composer and organist at Eisenach.

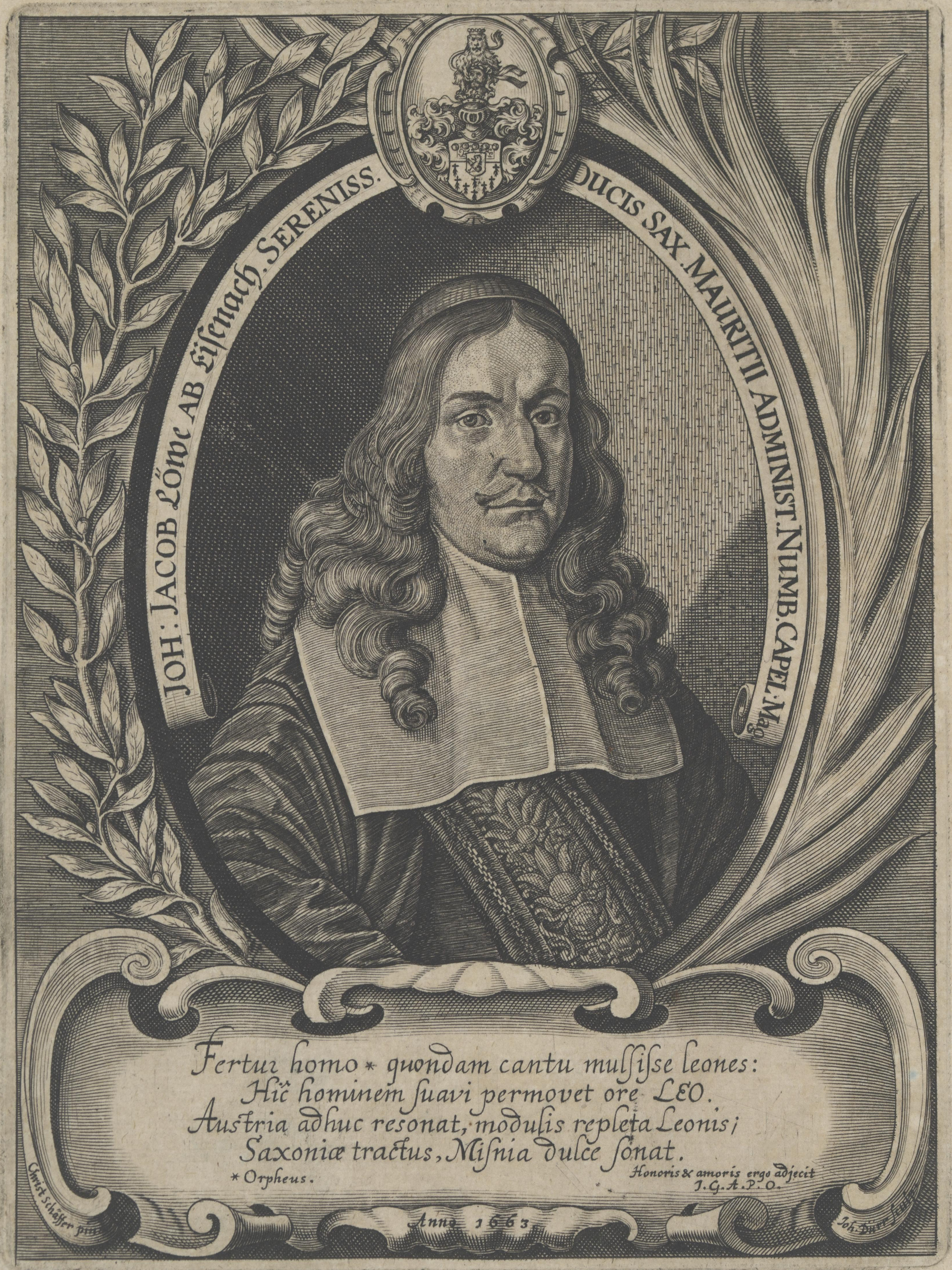
Johann Jacob Löwe

He was educated in Vienna and recommended by Heinrich Schütz for the position of Hofkapellmeister.

== Works ==
Operas

- Löwe composed ten Singspiels and operas, among them Andromeda, to librettos by Anton Ulrich von Braunschweig.

Songs

- With his friend Julius Johannes Weiland he published Zweyer gleichgesinnten Freunde Tugend- und Schertz Lieder (1657).

Instrumental

- Albert Rodemann: Two Suites (Rodemann); By Loewe Von Eisenach, Johann Jacob (1628–1703).
