= Johann Müller (composer) =

German composer and organist

Johann Müller (Dresden, fl. 1640–ca. 1670) was a German composer and organist.

He worked for the Elector of Saxony, and was a pupil of Marco Giuseppe Peranda.

== Recordings ==
- On Friedens-Seufftzer und Jubel-Geschrey - Music for the Peace of Westphalia. Weser-Renaissance Ensemble Bremen dir. Manfred Cordes. cpo
