= Jan z Jasiennej =

Polish composer

John of Jasienna (c.1400) was a Polish composer at the Jagiellon chapel in Cracow. His only surviving manuscript works were reconstructed and recorded on Musique a la chapelle des Jagiellons 1990 by Ars Nova (Polish ensemble).
