= Michael Jacobi =

German composer (1618–1663)

Michael Jacobi (1618–1663) was a North German composer and kantor.

He studied law at Strasbourg (1641) and travelled widely before taking employment as kantor first at Kiel (1648) then at Lüneburg (1651). Under his supervision the first passions were performed at Lüneburg. He collaborated with the poet Johann Rist for many years including on settings of Rist's Das friedewünschende Teutschland for the Peace of Westphalia.

== Recordings ==
- Liedeinlagen zu Rists Das friedewünschende Teutschland: 1. Himmel, weine bitterlich 2. Bist du denn blind, o Teutsches Reich. 3. So ligt denn nun das arme Weib. Weser-Renaissance Ensemble Bremen dir. Manfred Cordes. cpo
