= Julius Ernst Rautenstein =

Julius Ernst Rautenstein (c. between 1590 and 1595 – after 6 March 1654) was a German composer.

Rautenstein was born in Lauenburg, Hamburg, and became the organist at Halberstadt. His dialogue motet Ich schlafe, aber mein Herz wachet, for 4 voices (5:27) is recorded on Hanseatic Wedding music. Weser-Renaissance Ensemble Bremen dir. Manfred Cordes. cpo. Rautenstein died in Szczecin.
