= Vicentz Rupffenbart =

German schoolmaster and amateur composer

Vicentz Rupffenbart (fl. 1621) was a Calvinist schoolmaster in Purla, Laussnitz and an amateur composer.

His best known work is the "Calvinist dance" Calvinistischer Vortantz, welcher in Ober Oesterreich geschmittet, zu Prag in Böhaim angefangen, und wider die Papisten allenthalben gehalten worden ist. (Genff in Hollandt: Niclas Gumperle, 1621). Vierstimmiger homophoner Satz (SATB) mit 37 Strophen. This is recorded on Friedens-Seufftzer und Jubel-Geschrey - Music for the Peace of Westphalia, Weser-Renaissance Ensemble Bremen dir. Manfred Cordes, CPO.
