= Erasmus Widmann =

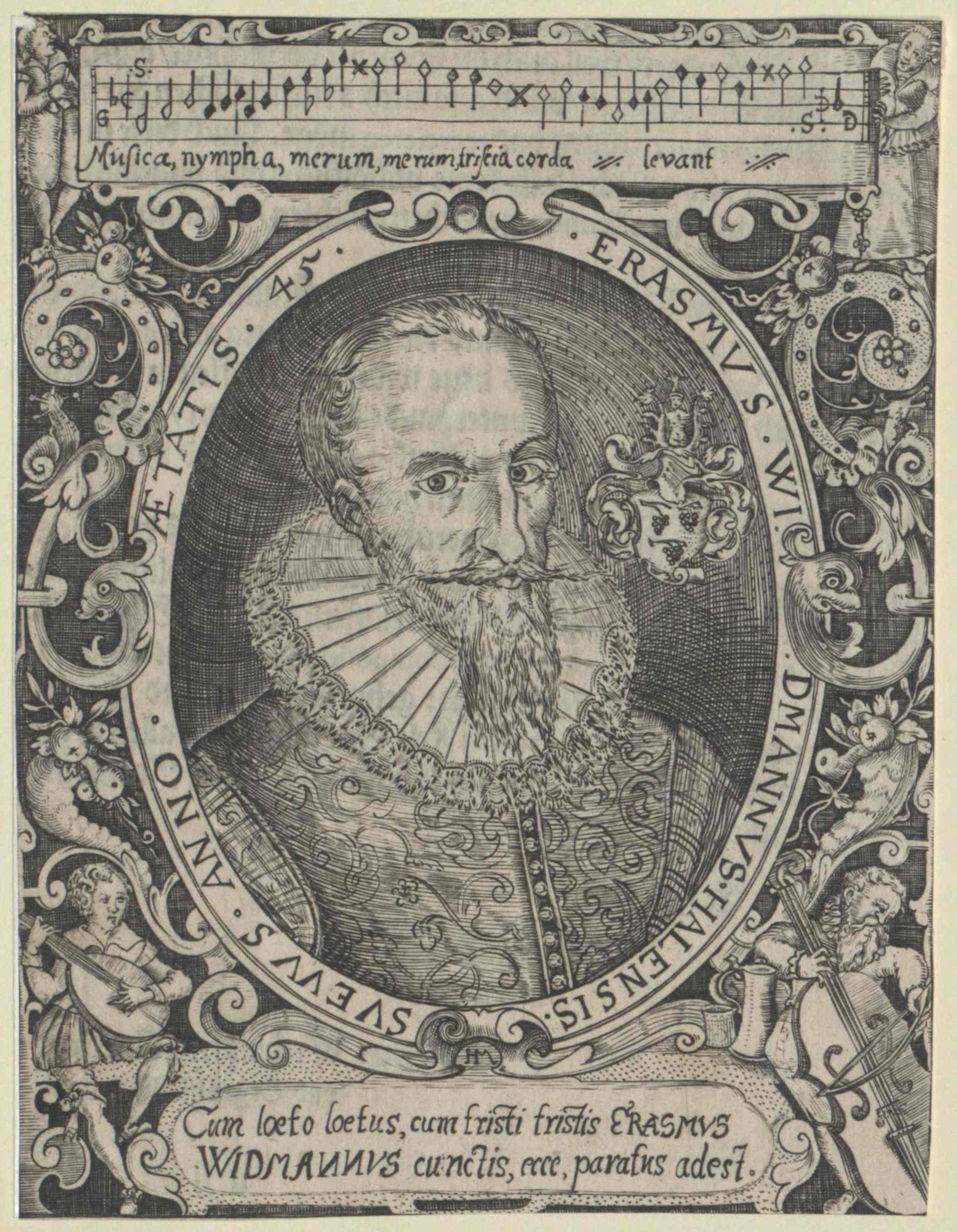
Erasmus Widmann

Erasmus Widmann (1572–1634) was a South German composer.

Widmann was born at Schwäbisch Hall, and studied in Tübingen. His first musical positions were in Eisenerz (1595), Graz (1596), Schwäbisch Hall, and from 1602 Kapellmeister to Count Wolfgang von Hohenlohe-Weikersheim till the count's death in 1610. Finally Widmann was cantor and organist at Rothenburg ob der Tauber.

== Works ==
A large quantity of dances and songs.

- Drei Motetten
- Die Musikalische Kurzweil (1611), modern edition Verlag C. Hofius Ammerbuch, 2012, ISMN 9790502480837
- Musikalischer Tugendspiegel (1613)
- Canzonas Intradas and Galliard (1618)

== Recordings ==
- Widmann, Erasmus: »Piorum suspiria. Andechtige Seufftzen unnd Gebet umb den lieben Frieden ...«. Rothenburg o.d.T.: Simon Halbmayer, o.J. (1629). 30 kürzere Sätze zu 3 und 4 Stimmen mit jew. etlichen Strophen. Nur die ersten 7 Sätze beziehen sich auf den Frieden, diese vierstimmig (SATB). On Friedens-Seufftzer und Jubel-Geschrey - Music for the Peace of Westphalia. Weser-Renaissance Ensemble Bremen dir. Manfred Cordes. cpo
