= Bazyli =

Bazyli (Polish pronunciation: [baˈzɨ.li]) is a Polish masculine given name. Its English cognate is Basil. Notable people with this name include:

== People ==
- Bazyli Bohdanowicz (1740–1817), Polish violinist and composer
- Bazyli Doroszkiewicz (1914–1998), Polish Orthodox bishop
- Bazyli Skalski, 16th–17th century Polish printer
- Bazyli Wójtowicz (1899–1985), Polish sculptor

== See also ==
- Leon Bazyli Sapieha (1652–1686), Polish-Lithuanian politician
- Mikołaj Bazyli Potocki (1712–1782), Polish nobleman
