= Johann Werlin =

German composer

Johann Werlin (died ca. 1680) was a German Baroque composer.

== Works ==
- Werlin, Johannes: »Irenodiae, Oder Friedens-Gesäng, Das ist: Neue Geistliche Concert ... Auff jetzo gebräuchliche Italiänische Invention«. Ulm: Johann Görlin (Balthasar Kühn), 1643/1644. on Friedens-Seufftzer und Jubel-Geschrey - Music for the Peace of Westphalia. Weser-Renaissance Ensemble Bremen dir. Manfred Cordes. cpo
