= Marcin Mielczewski =

Polish composer

Marcin Mielczewski (c. 1600 – September 1651) was, together with his tutor Franciszek Lilius and Bartłomiej Pękiel, among the most notable Polish composers in the 17th century.

== Biography ==
By 1632 he was a composer and musician in the royal chapel in Warsaw. In 1645 he became director of music to Charles Ferdinand Vasa, the brother of King Władysław IV. Mielczewski died in Warsaw in September 1651.

His known works are largely in the stile concertato, and Szweykowski suggests that the way "in which the words are given full expression" means he is likely to have composed secular vocal works in addition to the surviving sacred corpus. In his mass O glorioso domina and one of his instrumental canzonas, Mielczewski quotes popular Polish tunes; the latter is notable for being the earliest documented use of the mazurka in classical music.

== Works ==
=== Masses ===
- Missa Triumphalis a 14
- Missa Cerviensiana, six voices and six instruments
- Missa O Gloriosa domina, six voices and basso continuo
- Missa super 'O Gloriosa Domina'

=== Motet ===
- Ante thorum huius Virginis
- Audite et admiramini
- Audite gentes et exsultate
- Beata Dei Genitrix
- Benedictio et claritas
- Benedictus sit Deus
- Confitemini Domino
- Credidi a 8
- Credidi a 12
- Currite populi
- Dixit Dominus
- Gaude Dei Genitrix
- Gaudete omnes et exsultate
- Ingredimini omnes
- Iste cognovit
- Iubilate Deo
- Laetatus sum
- Lauda Jerusalem Dominum
- Laudate Dominum in sanctis eius
- Laudate pueri Dominum
- Magnificat octavi toni
- Magnificat primi toni
- Magnificat tertii toni
- Nisi Dominus aedificaverit domum
- O lumen Ecclesiae
- Plaudite manibus
- Quem terra, pontus, aethera
- Triumphalis dies
- Victimae paschali laudes
- Virgo prudentissima

=== Others ===
- Canzona prima a due
- Canzona prima a tre
- Canzona quarta a tre
- Canzona quinta a tre
- Canzona seconda a due
- Canzona seconda a tre
- Canzona terza a tre
- Deus in nomine tuo
- Salve Virgo Puerpera
- Sub tuum praesidium
- Veni Domine
- Vesperae Dominicales I
- Vesperae Dominicales II

== Selected recordings ==
- Mielczewski: Complete Works Vol.1-6 Musicae Antiquae Collegium Varsoviense Lilianna Stawarz 6CDs 1998-2000
- Mielczewski: Missa super O Gloriosa Domina (on Msze Staropolskie) Il Canto 1993 (Accord)
- Mielczewski: Virgo prudentissima; Quem terra pontus; Beata Dei Genitrix (2 Versionen); Salve virgo; Ante thorum huius virginis; Magnificat primi toni (with works by Adam Jarzebski and Mikołaj Zielenski), Weser-Renaissance Manfred Cordes (cpo)
- Mielczewski: Virgo Prudentissima with works by Bartłomiej Pękiel) Les Traversees, Meyer (K617) 5.99
- Vesperae Dominicales, Wroclaw Baroque Ensemble Andrzej Kosendiak,(Accord) 2016
