= Ensemble Weser-Renaissance Bremen =

German instrumental ensemble

The Ensemble Weser-Renaissance Bremen is a German instrumental Ensemble, which specialises primarily in the preparation and performance of the musical works of the Renaissance and Baroque music.

== Characteristic ==
Since its foundation in 1993, the Ensemble Weser-Renaissance Bremen has developed into an ensemble for the music of the 16th and 17th centuries. It is now a regular guest at major European festivals for early music and has repeatedly recorded newly discovered music from the Renaissance and early Baroque periods, which has been positively received by musical experts.

The ensemble is geared towards the best possible representation of the respective repertoire and is therefore variable in its instrumentation. In addition to international vocal soloists, highly specialised instrumentalists for the original instruments of the respective epoch will be engaged. The aim is a lively and at the same time stylistically correct rendition of the works of the 16th and 17th centuries. In addition to the performance of Italian, Flemish, English and Central German composers, special attention is paid to North German music.

The director of the ensemble, which was founded in 1993, is Manfred Cordes, a lecturer at the Hochschule für Künste Bremen.
