= Klaudia Pasternak =

Polish musician

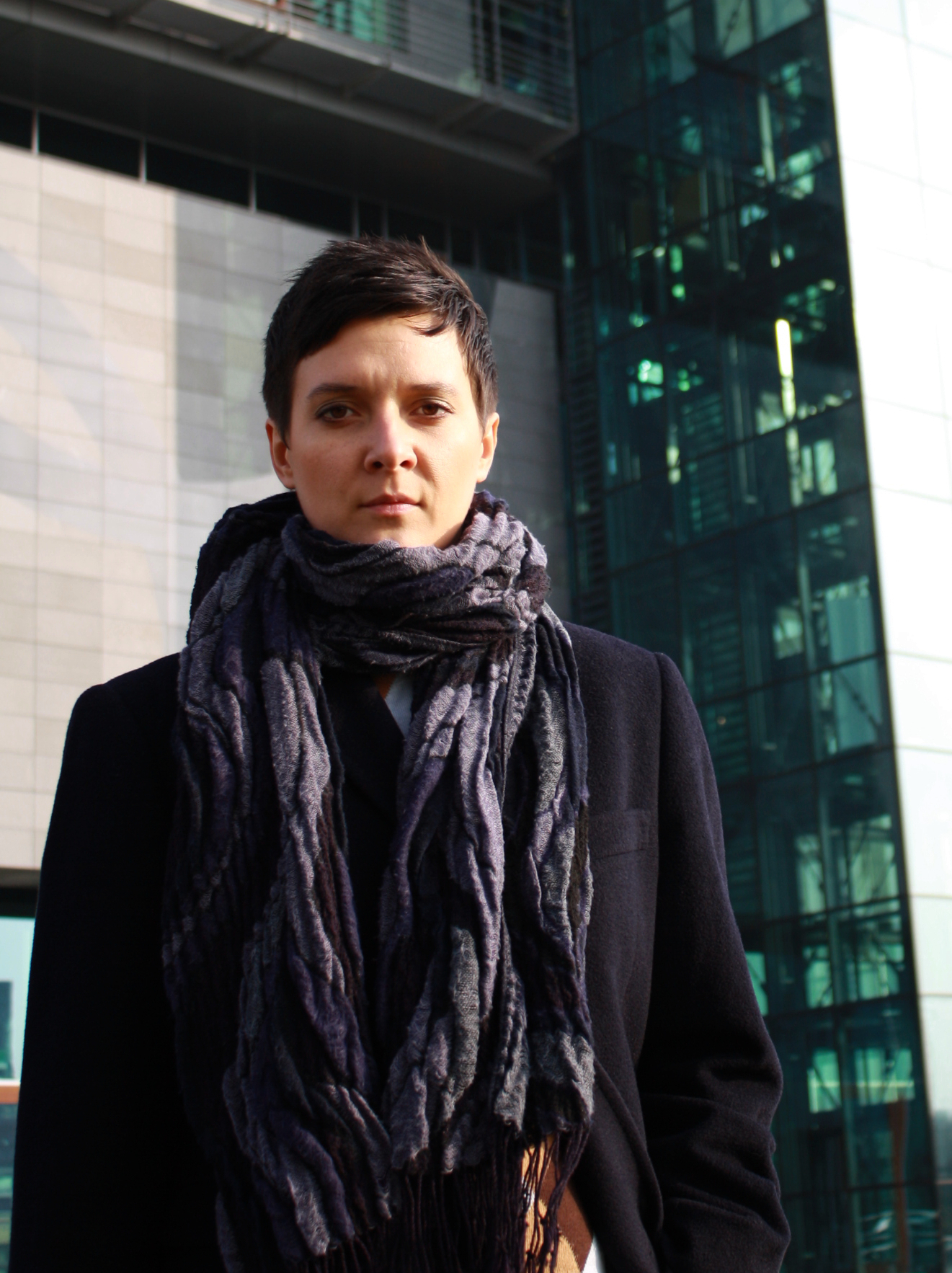
Klaudia Pasternak, 2010

Klaudia Pasternak (born 1980) is a Polish contemporary composer and opera conductor, who has twice been nominated for the prestigious Paszport Polityki (Policy Passport).

== Life ==
Pasternak was born in Warsaw, Poland, to a musical family. At the age of 12, she began composing her own music, her first piece being a Suite for piano. At the age of 11, she started playing percussion and studied with Bogdan Lauks, in the Music High School of Józef Elsner. She also began to conduct at that time. At the age of 17, she received her first composer award. In 2000 she began studies at the Fryderyk Chopin Academy of Music in Warsaw. She studied composition with Stanisław Moryto and symphony – opera with Tomasz Bugaj.

Pasternak lives and works in Warsaw. She is also involved in supporting democratic values and woman rights in Poland and abroad.

== Events ==
In 2000 and 2005 Pasternak received a scholarship from The Ministry of Culture and National Heritage in Poland. In 2000 and 2005 she was nominated to Policy Passport in the Music category. In 2000, she participated in the 20th International Composers Course in Radziejowice, organized by the Society for Contemporary Music, where she met Christina Asher, Zygmunt Krauze, Wojciech Michniewski, Louis Andriessen and Hanna Kulenty. In 2003, Pasternak conducted lectures about Polish contemporary music (including her own) at the University of Oregon. In 2003 she participated in masterclasses of conducting led by Antoni Wit, in Austria. In 2005 she took part in composition masterclasses led by French composer Betsy Jolas, in France. In 2006 she received two scholarships from the prestigious scholarship project Młoda Polska (Young Poland) founded by The Ministry of Culture and National Heritage, as well as the Creativity Support Fund scholarship founded by the Association of Stage Writers and Composers ZAiKS. In 2010 she became a finalist in the composer competition Unique forms of continuity in space organized by the Italian Institute in Melbourne, Australia.

=== Broadcast ===
Her music was broadcast in Poland and abroad including the public Polish Television (TVP), Campus Radio, Polish Radio Second Channel PR 2, Polish Bis Radio, Hamburg Radio, Katowice Radio, Denmark Radio. As a composer she was involved with the production of the television series Dolina Kreatywna, czyli czego szuka mloda sztuka (Creative Valley) created by Polish Television TVP2.

== Composition ==
Pasternak in her works combines modern composition techniques with traditional means of expression. Piano and vocals play special roles in her work.

=== Awards ===
- 1st Prize: Second National Composer Competition ”Patri Patriae” in Katowice dedicated to Pope John Paul II for piece Pictures from Tatry, for string trio. Chairman of the jury was Wojciech Kilar, 1998
- 2nd Prize: Third International Composers Competition ”Premio Citta di Pescara”, for piece Cogitationes, for piano, Italy 2000
- 3rd Prize: Ivan Spassov International Composers Competition for piece Kayo, for vocal bass and piano, Bulgaria 2001
- 3rd Prize: Composer Competition in memory of Adam Didur, in Sanok, for piece Kayo, for vocal bass and piano, 2001
- 2nd Prize: Seventh Composers Competition ”Musica Sacra” in Czestochowa, for piece Ave vere, for mixed choir, 2002:
- Three prizes on Composers Competition ”Waging peace through singing” among 700 participation pieces from around the world, United States 2002:
  - Highest Honour – piece Sancte Angele Dei, for mixed choir
  - Top Honour – piece The Song, for female choir
  - Honour – emerging composer for piece Kayo, for vocal bass and piano
- 2nd Prize – the first was not awarded: Fifth Edition of the International Composer Competition ”Citta di Pescara”, for piece Seven faces of... , for piano, Italy 2006

=== Performances ===
Pasternak's compositions have been performed around the world including Germany, Denmark, the Czech Republic, Bulgaria, France, Italy, Switzerland, the United States, Japan and Sweden, during such events as:

Young Talented Concert at National Philharmonic in Warsaw • Schumannfest Festival 2004 in Düsseldorf, Germany • Oregon Bach Festival in Portland • Choral Festivals in Portland • Chicago • Florida • frequently in Polish Radio Recording Studio of Witold Lutosławski including series of concerts titled "Warsaw Generations" • Music Academy in Lucerne, Switzerland • Organ Seminars in Legnica • IV Festival of Paschal Music in Poznań • VII International Festival of Sacral Songs "Lapskie Te Deum" • Arizona State University • Northern Arizona University • I National Choral Competition "Ars Liturgica" in Toruń • concerts at Music Theatre in Lublin • XXIV Choral Meetings in Gliwice • Contemporary Music Festival of Witold Lutoslawski in Szczecin • Festival of Contemporary Music "Musikhost" – Polish Days in Denmark • International Festival "Musica Sacra" in Częstochowa • VI European Choral Meetings in Warsaw • VIII International Choral Competition in Slovenia • Lenten Concert at Polish National Opera in Warsaw • Concert of the Youth of Polish Composer Union ZKP during Warsaw Autumn • Choral concerts in Kyoto, Japan • Polish Composers Warsaw Branch concert of series "Musical Seasons – Autumn" • Choral concerts in Gothenburg, Sweden.

=== Performers ===
The performers of Pasternak compositions were outstanding artists and ensembles in Poland and abroad:

Silesia String Quartet • notabu.ensamble. under the baton of Marek Andreas Schlingensiepen • Pacific Youth Choir conducted by Mia Savage • Alla Polacca Choir conducted by Sabina Wlodarska • Wilanow String Quartet • pianist Maria Gabrys • organist Pawel Wrobel • pianist Marek Bracha • Oregon Repertory Singers conducted by Gil Seeley • saxophonist Piotr Wysocki • Czestochowa Philharmonic • saxophonist Dariusz Samol • harpsichordist and fortepianist Pawel Siwczak • double bass player Adam Bogacki • Camerata Silesia Choir • bass-baritone Grzegorz Szostak • Musica Viva Chamber Choir of Economic University in Poznań • soprano Dorota Laskowiecka • orchestra of Music Theater in Lublin • orchestra of Mazovian Music Theater in Warsaw • Camerata Jagellonica Academic Choir of Jagiellonian University • Vocal Art Ensemble • Ensemble Academy Kyoto • Grażyna Szapołowska.

=== Records ===
In 2005, the composition Ave vere was released on CD by the publisher Acte Préalable and on the album "Credo" by the choir "Musica Viva" in 2006. In 2006, the composition Ave Stella Matutina was released on "Songs of Light" album by the Pacific Youth Choir in United States. In 2007, Pasternak completed a series of recordings of her works in the Recording Studio of Radio Katowice. In 2010, composition Sancte Angele Dei was released on DVD by Ensemble Academy Kyoto in Japan.

== Conducting ==
- 2003: cooperation with Baden Sinfonietta, Austria
- 2005: cooperation with Czestochowa Philharmonic
- 2005: cooperation with Warsaw Philharmonic
- 2007/2008: cooperation with Music Theatre in Lublin, including Verdi's La Traviata directed by Waldemar Zawodzinski and Janina Niesobska (titled role played by Jaonna Wos); series of performances of Der Zigeunerbaron by Johann Strauss; Der Vogelhändler by Zeller, Fiddler on the Roof by Jerry Bock, Die Fledermaus by Strauss; conducting her own overture titled Operture in order of The Jubilee Concert of the 60th Music Theatre Anniversary
- 2008/2009: cooperation with Mazovian Music Theatre in Warsaw, conducting concerts and performances including Die Fledermaus with famous Polish actor Daniel Olbrychski; preparing premiere of Gräfin Mariza by Kálmán, contained her own jazz arrangement Orpheum, performed by Grażyna Szapołowska
- 2009: cooperation with Grand Opera in Łódź, preparing premiere of Carl Maria Weber's Der Freischütz

== Selected works ==
- Obrazki z Tatr (Pictures from Tatry) for string trio, 1998
- Ave vere for mixed choir, 1998
- Cogitationes for piano, op. 1, 1999
- Piesn (The Song) for female choir, 1999
- Diabolicus for violin, cello, electric guitar and piano, 2000
- Preludium 2000 for orchestra, nr 1, 2000
- Sancte Angele Dei for mixed choir, op. 2 nr 1, 2001
- Kayo for vocal bas and piano, op. 3, 2001;
- Outsiede for cello, op. 4 nr 1, 2002
- Psalmy 42/22/11 (Psalms No. 42/22/11) for baritone and church organ, 2002
- Dawid i Goliat for double bass, op. 4 nr 2, 2002
- Ave stella matutina for female choir, op. 2 nr 2, 2003
- Siedem twarzy... (Seven faces of...) for piano, op. 6, 2003
- Devil's elbow for string quartet, op. 8, 2004
- Fantazja na temat Schumanna (Fantasy on the Theme of Schumann) for piano and chamber orchestra, op. 1 nr 2, 2004
- Jedenascie oddechow... (Eleven breaths of...) for sax, 2005
- Trans.For.My.Emptiness (Transforma) for church organ, 2008
- Tule Cie do serca (Cuddling to the heart) lullaby for soprano and string quartet (lyrics by composer), 2009
- Misterium Iniquitatis oratorio for mezzo-soprano, male voice and church organ, 2015
- Jekyll & Hyde-case study for two violins, 2015
- Piesni do slow wlasnych (Songs to own words) for soprano, mezzo-soprano, tenor, baritone and string orchestra, 2016
- Nowele rzymskie (Roman stories), ballet triptych, 2016
