= Collegium Vocale Bydgoszcz =

Polish vocal quartet

Collegium Vocale Bydgoszcz is a Polish vocal quartet founded in 1992.The band was founded on the initiative of Roman Fijałkowski a baritone soloist of the band Madrigalists Capella Bydgostiensis. The first line-up of this vocal quartet: Roman Fijałkowski - baritone, Michał Zieliński - tenor (artistic director). Janusz Cabała-countertenor, Hanna Michalak - soprano. Its repertoire includes polyphonic mass settings, motets, religious songs, madrigals and secular songs by European 13th to 17th century composers. The ensemble has cooperated with other Polish early music ensembles including Ars Nova, Capella Bydgostiensis, The Pomeranian String Quartet, Trombastic, Canor Anticus as well as with lutenists Magdalena Tomsińska and Henryk Kasperczak. The ensemble has participated in early music festivals of Poland as well as abroad in Germany, Denmark, Sweden, Belarus and Italy. The ensemble has made numerous recordings both for Polish Radio and Polish Television.

Since 2009 the quartet consists of soprano Patrycja Cywińska-Gacka, countertenor Janusz Cabała, baritone Łukasz Hermanowicz and baritone Michał Zieliński. Zieliński is also artistic director of the quartet and arranges and composes music for the programmes, occasionally under the pseudonym "Michał z Bydgoszczy", a pun on the home town of the quartet and the "z" (from) names of Renaissance composers such as Mikołaj z Radomia.

== Discography ==
- Wacław z Szamotuł songs and motets, Marcin Leopolita Missa paschalis (DUX 0248) 1994 reissue 2001
- "Jezusa Judasz przedał" – Polish passion motets and songs (DUX 0469), 2004
- "Bonjour, mon coeur" – Renaissance love songs (CVB 001), 2006
- "Impresje" – Arrangements of renaissance madrigals for vocal quartet and string quartet (CVB 002), 2007
- "Światło rozjaśniło się" – Old Polish carols (CVB 003), 2008
- "Melodie na Psałterz polski" – Psalms by Wacław z Szamotuł, Mikołaj Gomółka, Cyprian Bazylik (CVB 004), 2010
- "Chansons" – Songs of French renaissance composers (CVB 005), 2010
- "Fine knacks for ladies" – John Dowland (CVB 006), 2012
- "Missa super cantiones profanae" – A paraphrase mass cycle by "Michał z Bydgoszczy" (CVB 007), 2013
- "Na fraszki Jana z Czarnolasu" - On the epigrams of "Jan z Czarnolasu" (CVB 008), 2014
