= Cyprian Bazylik =

Polish composer and writer

Cyprian Bazylik's own coat of arms

"Zaniechaj towarzystwa z ludźmi złościwemi" by Cyprian Bazylik, performed by Collegium Vocale Bydgoszcz

Cyprian Bazylik (c. 1535 in Sieradz – c. 1600) was a Polish composer, usually designated as C.B. or C.S. (Cyprian of Sieradz). Besides writing music, he was also a writer, poet, and printer.

== Biography ==
He was a townsman from Sieradz. In the semester of 1550/1551 he matriculated at the Krakow Academy. He had already leaned towards Calvinism. He created poetic and musical works. Thanks to the support of Mikołaj Radziwiłł the Black, he received a position in the chancellery of Sigismund Augustus in Vilno. In 1557 he met Jacob Heraclides Basilicus and with his support was ennobled under his patron's coat of arms and name, as well as the title poeta laureatus. In 1558 he went to Lithuania, where he became a musician and rhyme-maker at the court of Mikolaj Radziwill the Black (along with Wacław of Szamotuły, who was already there). In 1569 he was secretary to Sieradz voivode Olbracht Łaski. He also soon married Agnes Lern, daughter of Stanislaw, a townsman from Krakow. He was a chanceller, printer and translator of Calvinist publications. In 1569-1570 he was the owner of the Radziwill printing house in Brest. He held the office of alderman in Mielnik and in the affiliated village of Orlovo. On November 25, 1576 he received from Stefan Batory the use of 7 fiefs (about 115 hectares) in the royal village of Moszczona and a lifetime security of aldermanship. On February 20, 1591, for unknown reasons, he relinquished the right to these estates to Stanisław Kuczkowski.

== Musical works ==
A dozen Polish songs and psalms for choir have been preserved a cappella. Unless otherwise noted, all songs are to be sung by 4 singers.

Songs – From the Zamość hymnal, c. 1558

- Pieśń o niebezpieczeństwie żywota człowieczego (lyrics by Jakuba Lubelczyka);
- Dobrotliwość Pańska (lyrics by Jakuba Lubelczyka);
- Pieśń nowa krześcijańska (lyrics by Jakub Lubelczyk);
- Pieśń nowa, w której jest dziękowanie (lyrics are possibly by Zofia Oleśnicka);
- Nabożna piosnka (lyrics by Andrzeja Trzecieskiego);
- Oratio Dominica (Our father, translated by Andrzeja Trzecieskiego);
- Piosnka bardzo piękna o Narodzeniu Pańskim (mainly for 3 singers).

– From other sources:

- Pieśń z Ewanjelijej wyjęta (lyrics by Jakuba Lubelczyka).

Psalms (all 4-voice and first published by Łazarz Andrysowicz in a now-lost print, later published again by Mateusz Siebeneicher, also preserved in the Zamość hymnal):

- 36 (translated by Jakuba Lubelczyka);
- 70 (translated by S.K. [possibly Sebastian Klonowic]);
- 79 (translated by Jakuba Lubelczyka);
- 127 (128) (translated by Jakuba Lubelczyka);
- 129 (130).

In addition, Bazylik is also the author of the one-voice hymns preserved in the Brzesko cantionary.

Cyprian Bazylika's songs have been recorded by Polish early music ensembles:

- Bornus Consort, conducted by Marcin Bornus-Szczyciński. A capella version, 10 songs.
- Ars Nova wraz z Subtilior Ensemble, chorus by Cantilena Sieradz, conducted by Jacek Urbaniak, vocal-instrumental version, 4 premieres, 15 songs.
- Ensemble JERYCHO, conducted by Bartosz Izbicki – "Cyprian Bazylik. Opera Omnia".

== Literary works ==
He was a composer closely associated with the Reformation, his hymns are a wonderful example of Polish-language Reformation religious writing of the 16th century. He left behind numerous occasional poems. He also translated four of the five books of Andrzej Frycz Modrzewski's Latin work De Republica emendanda (De moribus, De legibus, De bello, De schola) into Polish and published them under the Polish title O poprawie Rzeczypospolitej: O obyczajach, O statucie, O wojnie, O szkole; (he did not translate De Ecclesia – On the Church). As a writer, he distinguished himself with an excellent command of the Polish language.

=== Important works ===
- Krótkie wypisanie sprawy przy śmierci i pogrzebie Oświeconej Księżnej Pani Halżbiety z Szydłowca Radziwiłłowej, wojewodziny wileńskiej, Brest 1562, printing house of S. Murmelius
- Cyprian Bazylik do tegoż (also known as Odmieńca), poem in: Proteus albo Odmieniec, Brest 1564
- Wiersz na cześć Radziwiłłów, located in: T. Falconius, Sprawy i słowa Jezusa Krystusa, Brest 1566
- Wiersz do księcia M. Radziwiłła, located in: T. Falconius, Wtore księgi Łukasza świętego, Brest 1566
- Napis na grobie zacnego szlachcica Pawła Secygniowskiego, Brest Litovski 1570
- O zacności herbu Warnia, a o wielkiej dzielności ludzi rycerskich w domu panów Gnoińskich... historia, Kraków 1600

=== Major translations ===
- Historia o srogim prześladowaniu Kościoła Bożego... Przydatna jest k temu historia o postanowieniu i potem rozproszeniu kościołów cudzoziemskich w Londynie, nad którymi był prawdziwym a krześciańskim biskupem on świętej pamięci mąż Jan Łaski, Brześć 1567 (a reworking of John Crespin's work Actiones et monimenta martyrum, French edition 1554)
- M. Barleti Historia o żywocie i zacnych sprawach Jerzego Kastryota, którego pospolicie Szkanderbegiem zową, Brest 1569, printing house of C. Bazylik
- Nicolaus Olahus Historia spraw Atyle, króla węgierskiego, z łacińskiego języka na polski przełożona, Kraków 1574, printing house of M. Wirzbięta
- A. Frycz Modrzewski O poprawie Rzeczypospolitej księgi czwore, Łosk 1577, printing house of J. Karcan

=== Lists and materials ===
- List do Albrechta Pruskiego (Vilnius, 29 November 1560)
- Litterae nobilitationis Cypriani Siradiensis per Heraclidem Jacobum Basilicum, Sami princepem, marchionem Pari, datae ac per Sigismundum Augustum confirmatae (1 September 1557)
- Cypriano Basilico septem lanei in villa Msczona ad vitam dantur (Toruń, 25 November 1576)
- Conservatio ad vitae extrema tempora in advocatia Mielnicensi Cypriani Bazyliczi (Warsaw, 1 November 1582)
- Cessio advocatiae Mielnicensis et certi agri in villa Moszczana Stanislao Kuczkowski per Basilik (Warsaw, 20 February 1591)

=== Works of uncertain authorship ===
- Proteus abo Odmieniec, Brest 1564
- Postępek prawa czartowskiego, Brest 1570, printing house of C. Bazylik
- Pieśń ze 31 kap. Przypowieści Salomonowych o pobożnej a cnotliwej niewieście, Nieśwież 1564, printing house of Daniel z Łęczycy
- Commoda Henrici... (published in: J. Czubek Pisma polityczne z czasów pierwszego bezkrólewia, Kraków 1906)

== Bibliography ==
- Bibliografia Literatury Polskiej – Nowy Korbut, vol. 2 – Old Polish Literature, State Publishing Institute PIW, Warsaw 1964, pp. 16–17
- Ziomek, Jerzy (2012). Renesans. Wielka historia literatury polskiej (Wyd. 11 ed.). Warszawa: Wydawnictwo Naukowe PWN. ISBN 978-83-01-13843-1.
