= Szymon Starowolski =

Polish writer (1588–1656)

Szymon Starowolski (1588 – 1656; Simon Starovolscius) was a writer, scholar and historian in the Polish–Lithuanian Commonwealth. He was probably born near Pruzhany, and died near Kraków. He was a very prolific writer, and left behind over 70 works, mostly in Latin. Some of them survived until its translation into Polish.

== Life ==
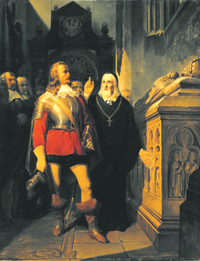
Starowolski (right) and King Charles X Gustav in Wawel Cathedral, Cracow, during the Deluge. Starowolski pointed out the tomb of King Władysław Łokietek who, thrice an exile, thrice returned. Charles Gustav said: "John Casimir [Poland's king] will never return." "Serenissime Rex [Most Serene King]," replied Starowolski, "Fortuna variabilis, Deus immutabilis [Fortune is variable, God is immutable]." Sweden's king died some months later, before John Casimir's triumphant return. Painting by Matejko.

Szymon Starowolski was born into an impoverished Lithuanian noble family. As a young man he visited the courts of many magnates, including the famous Chancellor Jan Zamoyski (at age 17) and Bishop Jakub Zadzik. After his studies, he traveled in the service of the Ostrogski family through Western Europe (Germany, France, Holland), where he visited the University of Louvain. On his return, from 1612 to 1619 Starowolski studied and taught at the Kraków Academy (Jagiellonian University), and then at the Cistercian monastery in Wąchock.

Starowolski became secretary to the famous Polish military commander, Hetman Jan Karol Chodkiewicz, whom he accompanied at the Battle of Chocim (1621). Later he served as tutor to many young nobles, among them Aleksander Koniecpolski, son of Hetman Stanisław Koniecpolski. Connected with many other powerful magnate courts, he often traveled abroad.

In 1639 he was ordained a Catholic priest, and subsequently became a canon and worked as a preacher, cantor and canon in Kraków and Tarnów. During the Swedish invasion of Poland (the Deluge), he performed the functions of a bishop in place of Piotr Gembicki.

== Works ==
Starowolski is famous for his many writings (in Polish and Latin) in history, geography, law, strategy, theology, literature and politics. His greatest passion was history. He became expert on the Ottoman Empire, which he considered both a great threat to Poland and a fascinating neighbor. In his Latin works, addressed to foreign readers, he defended the good name of Poland, while in his Polish writings he called for thorough reform of the Polish–Lithuanian Commonwealth. He stressed that every person is responsible for his actions, and that a higher position entails not only more privileges but also more responsibilities. He wrote over seventy books.

His critics have pointed out that Starowolski was an advocate of religious intolerance; he supported repressions against the Hussites, railed against the tolerant Statutes of Warsaw and apostates from Catholicism, tried to have Protestant schools and printing presses closed down and insisted that the Edict of Wieluń, passed in 1424 as an exception to Poland's general policy of religious toleration, was still law. He also believed that Christian dissenters should be considered as non-Christians along with Muslims and Jews.

While he advocated better treatment of peasants (serfs), he wrote that according to God's will there were three social classes: the nobility (the rulers), the priests (the guardians of morality), and the peasants (laborers).

- Lament of the Dying Mother, Poland, over her Undutiful Sons – published soon before his death, an important work in political science.
- Reformacja obyczajów polskich (Reform of Polish customs) – on how Poland should look like according to the God's plan.
- Scriptorum Polonicorum Hecatontas seu Centum illustrium Poloniae scriptorium elogia et vitae – Setnik pisarzy polskich (A Hundred Polish Writers), 1625 – a short biography of Polish authors, with the titles of their works.
- Wojownicy sarmaccy, czyli pochwały mężów słynących męstwem wojennym w pamięci naszej lub naszych pradziadów - biographies of famous Polish warriors and kings.
- The Perfect Knight – the ideal Christian soldier who selflessly serves his country, defends the faith, and strives for moral uprightness.
- O slawnych mowcach Sarmacji ("De claris orationibus oracoribus Sarmatiae", On the Famous Speakers of Sarmatia), 1628.
- The Lord's Sanctuary and The Ark of the Testament – sermons.
- Monumenta Sarmatorum – about ancient art, collecting information about old tombstones (digital copy).
- Various treaties on moral issues, aiming to reform Polish society.

== See also ==
- Andrzej Frycz Modrzewski
- Piotr Skarga
- Wacław of Szamotuły
- Wawrzyniec Grzymała Goślicki
- List of Poles
