= Józef Władysław Krogulski =

Polish pianist and conductor (1815–1842)

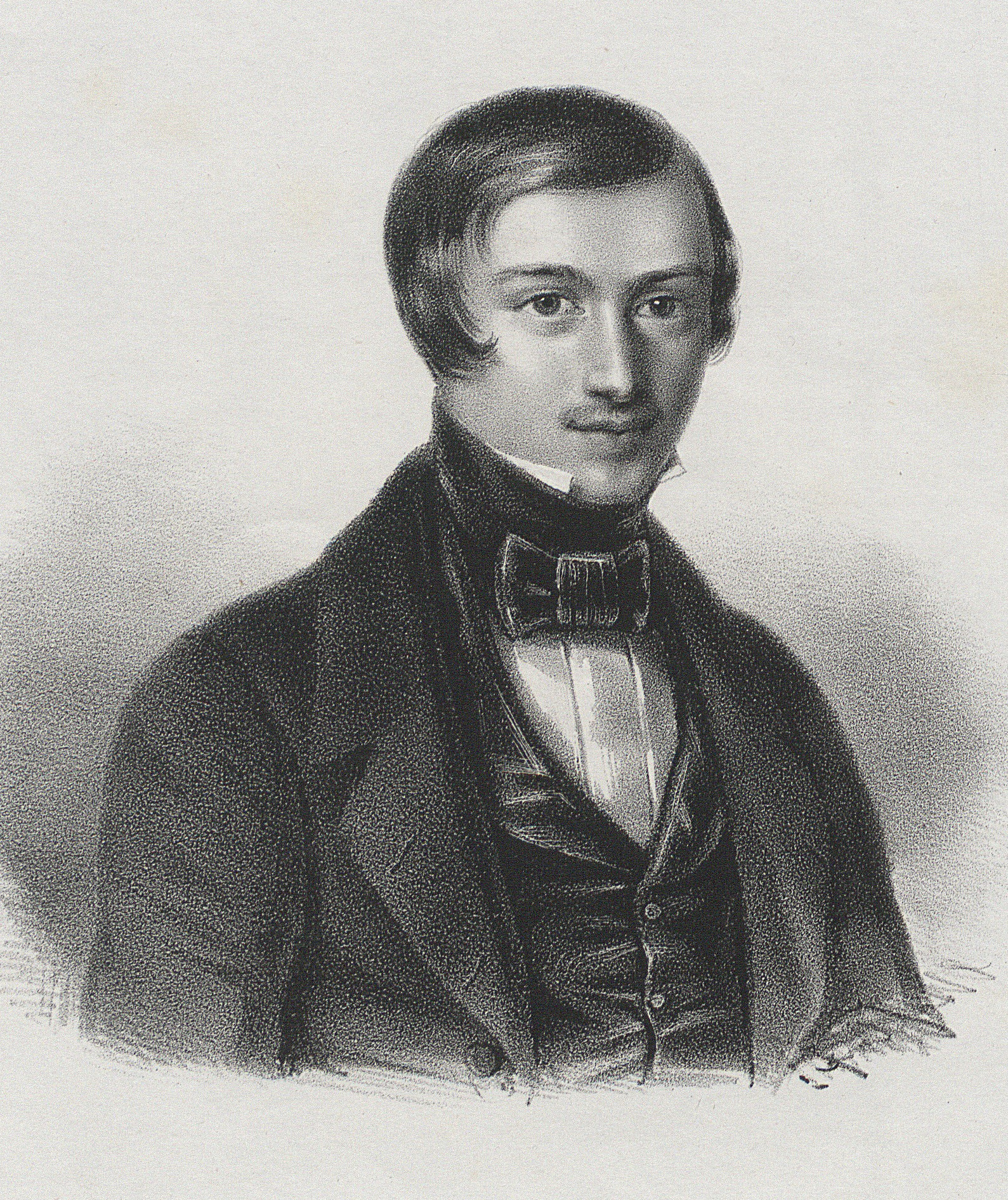
Józef Władysław Krogulski

Józef Władysław Krogulski (4 October 1815, in Tarnów, Poland – 9 January 1842, in Warsaw, Poland), was a Polish pianist, conductor, teacher, and composer. He first studied with his father, Michał Krogulski (1789–1859), and later studied with Józef Elsner and Karol Kurpiński at the Warsaw Conservatory. His half brother had the same name (sometimes Władysław Józef instead) and lived from 1843 to 1934.

== Selected works ==
=== Orchestral ===
- Overture in D minor (1831)
- Piano Concerto in E major (1830)
- Piano Concerto in B minor (1832)

=== Chamber ===
- Octet in D minor, Op. 6, for piano, two violins, viola, flute, clarinet, cello and double bass (circa 1832)
- Piano Quartet, Op. 2 (1835)
- String Quartet

=== Piano ===
- Piano Sonata (1829)
- La Bella Cracoviena
- Mazurka in D major
- Mazurka in E minor (a la Chopin)

=== Song ===
- Last Goodbye
- Let us praise the Lord
- Mazur of the recent past
- Lullaby for eternal sleep
- Elegy Spirit
- Coquette
- God, how stupid it is

=== Choral ===
- Requiem
- There are ten Polish masses for two to four voices
- Caravan in the Arabian Desert cantata for choir and orchestra
- Miserere cantata for soloists, choir and orchestra
- Passion oratorio for Good Friday
- Angus Dei for three bass voices
- Carol for male choir and organ

=== Opera ===
- Oh, my little wife
