= Paweł Wróbel =

Paweł Wróbel (born 24 April 1984 in Jasło, Poland) is a Polish organist.

== Biography ==
Wróbel studied at the Frederic Chopin Academy of Music in Warsaw with Andrzej Chorosiński, the University of Music and Performing Arts in Stuttgart with Jon Laukvik and the University of Music and Performing Arts in Graz with Gunther Rost. In 2012 he received a doctorate in musical arts at the Ignacy Jan Paderewski Academy of Music in Poznań.

He had won prizes in international organ competitions, include third prize during Miami International Organ Competition.

In 2007 he received a prestigious scholarship from Keimyung Research Foundation at the University of Seoul.

During the concert of the Club of Young Polish Composers, which took place within the confines of festival "Warsaw Autumn" (on 20 September 2008) he performed the following four compositions: Stained glass by Barbara Kaszuba, Trans. For. My Emptiness (Transforma) by Klaudia Pasternak, Proxima Centauri by Mateusz Ryczek, Deformations by Jacek Sotomski and he took part in compact disc ”live" recording of this concert by Musicon, Warsaw 2008.

== Awards ==
- 2005: Nowowiejski International Organ Competition in Poznań
- 2006: Sweelinck International Organ Competition in Gdańsk
- 2011: Zürich Internationaler Orgelwettbewerb
- 2012: Miami International Organ Competition

== Publications ==
- Organ transcription of Funérailles by Franz Liszt, Polihymnia, Lublin.
