= Daniel Selichius =

Daniel Selichius (1581-1626) was a German composer.

Selichius was briefly Kapellmeister at the court of the counts von Bünau Schloss Weesenstein in 1616. He then entered the service of the bishop of Osnabrück in 1617. He succeeded Michael Praetorius in Wolffenbüttel in 1621.

== Recordings ==
- Geistliche Konzerte "Opus novum" (Wolfenbüttel 1623/24) Musik aus Schloss Wolfenbüttel III Weser-Renaissance Bremen, Manfred Cordes
