= Andreas Berger (composer) =

German composer

Andreas Berger (1584–1656) was a German composer whose works featured in the collection of J. S. Bach. He was the son-in-law of the English emigre musician William Brade.

== Works, editions, and recordings ==
- Eight Part Canon in the Eighth Mode for Two Double Reed Quartet Choirs.
- Berger, Andreas: »Da pacem Domine & c. ... Deo ter opt. maximo, regi regum, Domino exercituum, principi pacis ...«. Augsburg: Johann Ulrich Schönig, 1635. Konzert zu 10 Stimmen in 2 Chören (SSATB/SATBB). On Friedens-Seufftzer und Jubel-Geschrey - Music for the Peace of Westphalia. Weser-Renaissance Ensemble Bremen dir. Manfred Cordes. cpo
