= Andrzej Siewiński =

Polish composer

Andrzej Siewiński (or Siwiński) (fl. 1725) was a Polish classical composer about whom little information survives. His only surviving work is a requiem, in a manuscript prepared in 1726 which contains the note "Requiescat in pace" next to the composer's name. The origin of the manuscript suggests that Siewiński was in some way connected with the Jesuits, though not necessarily as a member.
