= Julius Johann Weiland =

German composer

Julius Johannes Weiland (c. 1605 – 2 April 1663) was a minor German composer.

He was a singer and harpsichordist at the Wolfenbüttel court at the time of Augustus the Younger, Duke of Brunswick-Wolfenbüttel. With Johann Jacob Löwe (1628–1703), organist at Eisenach, he published Zweyer gleichgesinnten Freunde Tugend- und Schertz Lieder (1657). He died in Wolfenbüttel.

The small number of surviving works include:

- Salve Jesu 3 voices, 2 violins and basso continuo,
- Veni sancte spiritus a 6,
- Factum est proelium magnum.
