= Mateusz Rudkowski =

Ukrainian-Polish composer

- Born: c. 1809
- Died: c. 1887

Mateusz (or Mieczysław) Rudkowski (also Ukrainian: Матвій Рудковський; c. 1809 — c. 1887) was a Polish composer of choral and piano music.

He received his musical education in Lviv and Vienna. In 1850-1860 he was kapellmeister of the choir of Greek Catholic seminary in Lviv, and directed the Ukrainian choir of Stauropegion Institute.

Rudkowski was a member of the Galician Music Society in Lviv, and taught its members choral and especially church singing. Some of his compositions were published at his own expense and by Żupański in Poznań, and others by Wild and Kallenbach in Lviv. He composed a mass performed in Lviv in 1855 or 1856.

Rudkowski's compositions were regularly reviewed in Ruch Muzyczny: Opp. 2 and 3 in 1860, Opp. 4 and 5 in 1861.

== Sources ==
- Albert Sowiński (1874). Słownik muzyków polskich dawnych i nowoczesnych. p. 326.
- Karol Estreicher (1876). Bibliografia polska XIX stólecia. T. 4 (R–U). p. 139.
- Енциклопедія українознавства: Словникова частина: [в 11 т.] / Наукове товариство імені Шевченка; гол. ред. проф., д-р Володимир Кубійович. Париж; Нью-Йорк: Молоде життя; Львів; Київ: Глобус, 1955—2003.
- Муха Антон. Композитори України та української діаспори. К.: 2004. ISBN 966-8259-08-4
