= Bazyli Bohdanowicz =

Polish violinist and composer

Bazyli Bohdanowicz (born in Eastern Lesser Poland in 1740, died on 23 February 1817 in Vienna) was a Polish violinist and composer.

He was a member of the orchestra in the Leopoldstädter Theater after moving to Vienna in 1775. He and his wife performed unconventional concerts in Vienna in the years 1785-1803 accompanied by their eight children. Some of the pieces performed included: the 3-part sonata for violin Les prémices du monde (played on one instrument by three children), Non plus ultra for four female voices and violin (played on one instrument by three children and the father), the three-part Sinfonía vocale ed origínale senza parole (for 8 vocal voices, choir, and pipes called Sprach-tone), Aria con variazioni for solo soprano, andantino with variations Rareté extraordinaire de la musique for piano for 8 hands, concerto with cadenza Europa's Erstling (for three vocal voices accompanied by a whistle and orchestra). Bohdanowicz's circus performances sparked criticism and earned him the nickname of a "musical charlatan".

He composed a symphony in which he adapted motifs from Polish folk music, one vocal symphony, polonaises and other dances, two violin duets, other works of chamber music, and a piano etude for four hands.

Bohdanowicz's works were among the era of composers in the 1770s ande 1780s that presented more developed ideas in their work in their construction and overall symphonic thinking. These compositions often consisted of longer pieces with more movements, such as Bohdanowicz's Symphony in D.
