= Piotr of Grudziądz =

Polish medieval composer

Petrus Wilhelmi de Grudencz or Piotr of Grudziądz (1392 – c. 1480) was a medieval composer from Graudenz (Grudziądz). His compositions mainly consist of songs and motets considered characteristic of the culture of Central Europe in the Middle Ages.

== Biography ==
de Grudencz began his studies at the University of Kraków in 1418. It is believed that he later worked in Vienna, then in the vicinity of Basel. In the 1440s he was a chaplain to Frederick III in Vienna, although was not a singer in the chapel but moved principally in various university circles. In the last years of his life he worked in Silesia. In 1448, he was at the episcopal court in Wrocław. In 1452 he traveled to Rome.

While fewer than twenty of his works have survived, including Kyrie fons bonifitatis and the five-voice motet Panis / Panis / Pange / Patribus / Tantum, they can be securely attributed on account of containing acrostics of the composer's name.

== Bibliography ==
- Paweł Gancarczyk, 'Local, International or Central-European? Repertories of Mensural Polyphony in Fifteenth-Century Silesia' In Imitatio - Aemulatio - Superatio? Vokalpolyphonie des 15./16. Jahrhunderts in Polen, Schlesien und Böhmen, ed. Jürgen Heidrich (Münster, 2016), pp. 23–35.
- Paweł Gancarczyk, 'Petrus Wilhelmi de Grudencz und die mitteleuropäische Musikkultur des 15. Jahrhunderts' In Mittelalterliche Literatur und Kultur im Deutschordensstaat in Preussen: Leben und Nachleben, ed. Siegliende Hartmann, Jarosław Wenta, Gisela Vollmann-Profe (Toruń 2008), pp. 97–106.
