= Jan Pogány =

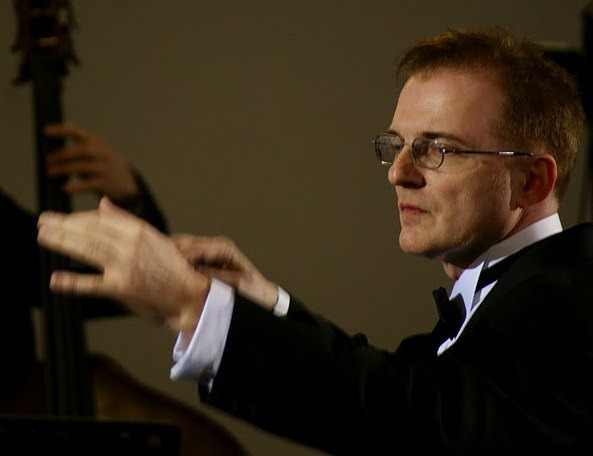
Jan Pogány in 2012

Jan Maślankiewicz-Pogány (born 23 June 1960) is a Polish classical composer, conductor and cellist. His music adopts the romantic style and is a symbiosis of the modern form of romantic harmony and lyrical melodic line.

== Biography ==
Pogány was 23 June 1960 in Kołobrzeg. He is a graduate of cello and conducting studies in Richard Strauss Conservatory in Munich, Germany). He studied at the Music Academy in Wrocław, Poland. He works with numerous orchestras such as the ones Germany, Japan, South Korea, Greece, Poland as well as opera companies.

He founded the Polish Chamber Orchestra Camerata-Wrocław. He was Director General of the International Brahms Festival Wrocław.

== Recognition ==
- 2008 – the II prize at the International Composers Competitions in Torrevie (Spain),
- 2009 – the III prize at the International Composers Competitions in Luxembourg.

== Works ==
- 2002 – Film music for the German TV crime series Mit Herz und Handschellen
- 2005 – Cantata of Kołobrzeg for two sopranos, tenor, baritone, choir and orchestra, the composition was written on the jubilee 750th anniversary of Kolobrzeg
- 2006 – Fantasia in D minor for cello and orchestra
- 2007 – Cantata “La Voce del Destino” for tenor, violin and orchestra
- 2008 – Opera "Acrobat" composer is also the author of the libretto, first performance was at the Munich Philharmonic Hall.
- 2008 – Introduction and Waltz of fate.
- 2009 – Requiem a-moll for opera singer Antonina Kawecka.
- 2009 – Musical “Cruise”
- 2011 – Requiem Smolensk in memoriam. First performance was in the Polish Radio Concert Hall in Wrocław in the first anniversary of plane crash in Smolensk.
  - ...my Requiem gives hope and not force to cry. The open space of human life is closing from the absolute key of the time but it is only a prelude to eternity -Jan Pogány
- 2011 – “Rhapsody of Japan” for tenor, choir and orchestra.
- 2014 - Oman's Serenade for violin and orchestra.
