= Bartłomiej Pękiel =

Polish composer (c. 1601 – c. 1670)

Bartłomiej Pękiel (Polish: [barˈtwɔmjɛj ˈpɛŋkʲɛl]; b. ca. 1600; fl. from 1633; d. ca. 1670) was a Polish composer of baroque music.

== Biography ==
The writer and composer Johann Mattheson claimed that the composer was German and his name is sometimes recorded as "Peckel". Pękiel served the court in Warsaw from about 1633. After the Swedish invasion of Poland in 1655 he then moved to Wawel Cathedral Chapel in Kraków, where he was Kapellmeister after the death of Franciszek Lilius in 1657. After 1664 there are few references to him; the next Kapellmeister was appointed in 1670.

29 of Pękiel's works survive, mostly in manuscript. The musicologist Bartłomiej Gembicki divides these into two stages; early baroque (Warsaw) and church music in the style of prima pratica (Kraków). He wrote the only Polish church oratorio Audite mortales, on the topic of The Last Judgement.

== Works ==
=== Choral ===
- Missa pulcherrima (CATB)
- Missa Paschalis (ATTB)
- Missa Brevis (ATTB)
- Missae senza le cerimonie (CATB + CATB)
- Missa concertata "La Lombardesca"
- Missa a 4 voci (ATTB)
- Patrem na rotuły (ATTB)
- Patrem rotulatum (ATTB)
- Ave Maria. Motet (ATTB)
- Nativitas tua. Motet (ATTB)
- O adoranda Trinitas. Motet (ATTB)
- Magnum nomen Domini. Motet (CATB)
- Resonet in Laudibus. Motet (CATB)
- Salvator orbis. Motet (CATB)
- Domine ne in furore. Motet, (ATTB)
- Quae est ista. Motet, (ATTB)
- O Salutaris Hostia, Motet, (ATTB)
- Sub Tuum Praesidium. Motet (ATTB)

=== Instrumental ===
- Dialogo Audite mortales (for 3 viole da gamba, six voices and basso continuo)
- Trzy tańce polskie ("Three Polish Dances"): Uroczysty (moderato) - Dostojny (andante) - Wesoły (allegro)
- Dulcis amor Jesu (for five voices and basso continuo)

== Notable recordings ==
- Bartłomiej Pękiel, The Sixteen, COR16110, June 2013
