= Wacław of Szamotuły =

Polish composer (c. 1520 – c. 1560)

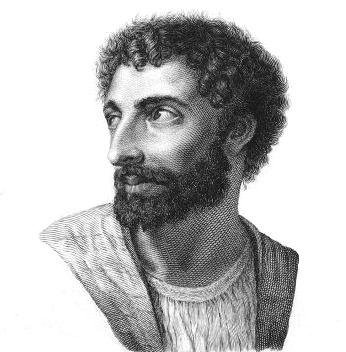
Imaginary 19th-century portrait of Szamotuły

Wacław z Szamotuł (c. 1520 in Szamotuły, near Poznań – c. 1560 in Pińczów), also known as Wacław Szamotulski (Latin: Venceslaus Samotulinus), was a Polish composer.

== Life ==
"Alleluja. Chwalcie Pana Boga" by Wacław z Szamotuł performed by the Collegium Vocale Bydgoszcz

Wacław z Szamotuł was a student at the Lubrański Academy in Poznań later studying at Kraków University in 1538. In 1547 or 1548 he was appointed composer to the court of Sigismund II Augustus. In 1555 Wacław left Kraków, having received the title of "royal composer." Nevertheless, during Szamotuly's lifetime his music was known outside of Poland.

He died early, and only a few of his works survive. In the words of Szymon Starowolski, who wrote the first concise biography of Wacław, "If the gods had let him live longer, the Poles would have no need to envy the Italians their Palestrina, Lappi or Vedana."

His motets In te Domine speravi and Ego sum pastor bonus were the first Polish musical compositions to be published abroad. According to Gustave Reese, Wacław's style may be seen in both of these motets; "the constant overlapping of phrases and full-fledged imitative style reveal Franco-Netherlandish influence."

== Works ==
Motets (Motety)

- In te, Domine, speravi (published in Nuremberg, 1554)
- Ego sum pastor bonus (published in Nuremberg, 1564)
- Nunc scio vere

Songs (Pieśńi)

- Alleluja, Chwalcie Pana Alleluia (Laudate Dominum omnes gentes — Hallelujah, Praise the Lord)
- Nakłoń, Panie, ku mnie ucho Twoje (Turn Thy Ear to Me, O Lord)
- Kryste dniu naszej światłości (O Christ, Day of Our Light) — a Lenten compline hymn (c. 800)
- Błogosławiony człowiek (Beatus vir, qui non abiit... — Blessed Is the Man)
- Modlitwa, gdy dziatki spać idą or Już się zmierzka (A Prayer When the Children Go To Sleep). This is perhaps his best-known composition. Henryk Górecki (born 1933) has used this beautiful Renaissance melody in at least three compositions: Chorale in the Form of a Canon (1961/1984), Old Polish Music (1969), and the First String Quartet (1988), subtitled Już się zmierzcha (Dusk is Approaching).
- Pieśń o narodzeniu Pańskim or Pochwalmyż wszytcy społem (Song of the Nativity)
- Powszechna spowiedź (Daily Confession). This composition has a homophonic texture, meaning that essentially all the notes occur at the same time, as contrasted with imitative polyphony.

=== Editions ===
- Szweykowski, Zygmunt, ed. (1956). Waclaw Z Szamotul (d. c. 1560): Songs for 4-v cappella. Vol. 28. interpretation indications by Stanislaw Wiechowicz (Editions of Early Polish Music ed.). Kraków: PWM Edition.
