= Franciszek Lilius =

Polish composer

Franciszek (Franciscus) Lilius (c. 1600 – 1657) was a Polish composer, a descendant of the Italian Giglis family. He significantly contributed to the musical culture of Warsaw in the 17th century. In 1630, he moved to Kraków, where he remained head of the cathedral orchestra until his death.

== Best known works ==
- Missa Brevissima
- Missa tempore Paschali
- Surrexit Christus Hodie, a motet
