= Adam Jarzębski =

Polish composer

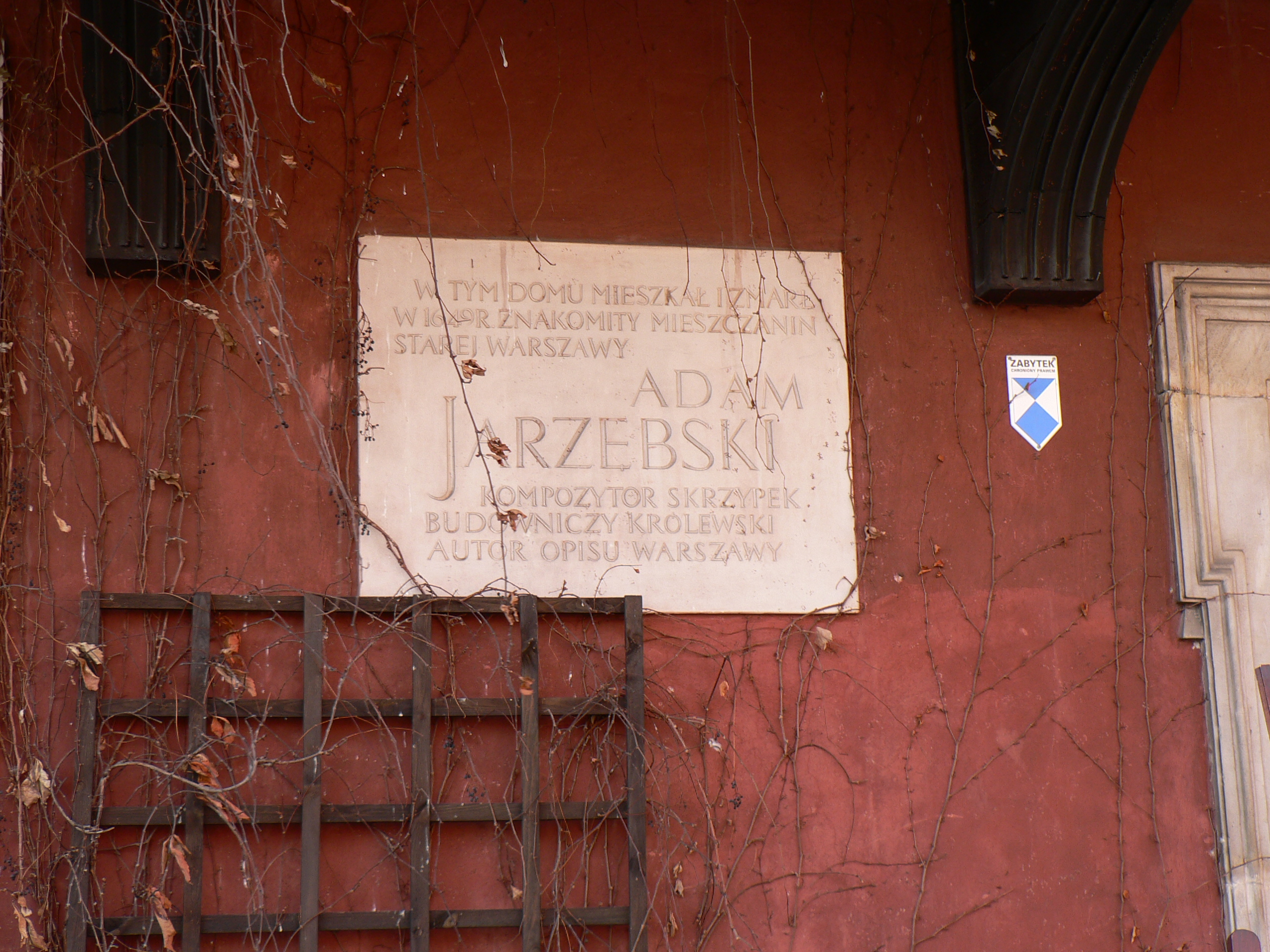

Adam Jarzębski (c. 1590 in Warka – 1648/49 in Warsaw) was an early Baroque Polish composer, violinist, poet, and writer. His main extant work Canzoni e concerti (copied in 1627) is not only one of the most important collections of early baroque instrumental ensemble music in Europe but also stands as a unique historical landmark as containing the first purely instrumental compositions to bear the designation concerto.

The first documented mention of Jarzębski was in 1612, when he became a member of the chapel of John Sigismund, Elector of Brandenburg in Berlin. After he had stayed in Italy for a year (1615–16), he became a member of the royal musical establishment, first at the court of Sigismund III Vasa and then of Władysław IV. He was held in great esteem by the royal court and was very popular among the members of the patriciate of Warsaw. In 1635 he managed the construction of the royal palace at Ujazdów. In 1643 he published a literary work Gościniec, albo krótkie opisanie Warszawy (The Main Road, or a Short Description of Warsaw) describing the customs and the musical life of the town. He died in Warsaw in 1649. He was an outstanding figure in the history of the Polish culture of the 17th century.

He composed mainly instrumental music. Canzoni é Concerti (27 works) is the first major collection of Polish compositions for instrumental ensembles (2-, 3-, 4- part and basso continuo). With regard to form and compositional technique his works did not depart from the most valuable models of his genre in Europe. Most frequently the composer indicated only registers and various combinations of voices: he mentions particular instruments only occasionally. Some works are based on a vocal original, the remaining ones are original instrumental works (concertos and canzonas). Only two vocal works survive: the canon More veterum and a fragment of the mass Missa sub concerto.
