= Mikołaj z Radomia =

15th-century Polish composer

Mikołaj Radomski, also called Mikołaj z Radomia and Nicholas of Radom, was an early 15th-century Polish composer. He was connected with the court of Władysław Jagiełło and wrote polyphonic music renowned for its expression of religious contemplation.

== Life and career ==
Mikołaj z Radomia was a Polish composer working in the first half of the 15th century, probably in Kraków, known only through his signatures on a few compositions: „N. de Radom”, „Nicolaus de Radom” and „Mycolay Radomsky”. Searches for the composer's identity have not brought any results so far. Hypotheses have been put forward in the literature (for example H. Musielak) linking the identity of Mikołaj with any person in the sources with that name (e.g. „Nicolaus clavicembalista dominae reginae Poloniae” from 1422, „Nicolaus Geraldi de Radom”, who studied in Kraków, where he gained his master's degree, and in the years 1389–91 was named in the Vatican acts as a spiritual person born in Radom and linked with the Kraków diocese, a few Mikołajs from Radom studying in the Kraków Academy in the years 1420, 1426 and others, a few signed in manuscripts from the second half of the 14th century and the second half of the 15th century from the Jagiellonian Library and the psaltery of the Wawel Cathedral in 1460) but have not been confirmed to date. Compositions signed with the name M. and to date not identified as works of other composers are noted with black mensura in two Polish collections of polyphonic music from the second quarter of the 15th century (1440?): in manuscripts of the Świdziński Library, later the Krasiński Library signature 52, now the National Library signature III 8054 and a manuscript in the Załuski Library, next the Imperial Library in St Petersburg signature F. Lat. I 378 and next in the University Library in Warsaw, then the National Library, lost during the second world war and now known through microfilm copies (incomplete) and hand-written transcriptions made from the original by M. Szczepańska and kept in the PAN Institute of Art in Warsaw; both manuscripts are published in «Antiquitates Musicae in Polonia».

== Recordings ==
- Mikołaj z Radomia - Complete Works Ars Nova Ensemble, Jacek Urbaniak DUX Records 1990
