= Szymon Krzeszowiec =

Polish violinist, chamber musician and teacher

- Origin: Tychy/Katowice, Poland
- Genres: contemporary, classical
- Occupation: violinist
- Labels: DUX, Sony Classical

Szymon Krzeszowiec (pronounced [ˈʂɨmɔn kʂɛˈʂɔvjɛt͡s]; born 20 April 1974) is a Polish violinist, chamber musician and pedagogue. Musician of the Silesian String Quartet and member of the Trio Aristos.

== Education ==
Szymon Krzeszowiec was born in Tychy, Poland. He started his musical education in the Complex of State Music Schools in Katowice, with Urszula Szygulska. Later, he went to the Karol Szymanowski Secondary Musical School in Katowice and studied there with prof. Paweł Puczek. As a pupil of this school, he won first prizes on all-Poland competitions and auditions. He took part in summer music academies in Łańcut and Żagań.

Between 1993 and 1997, he studied in the violin class of prof. Roman Lasocki in the Karol Szymanowski Academy of Music in Katowice (diploma with distinction). Later, he studied at the Conservatorium van Amsterdam with prof. Herman Krebbers. He participated in masterclasses with such artists as, among others: Glenn Dicterow, Dmitri Ferschtman, Paweł Głombik, Yair Kless, Krzysztof Węgrzyn and Tadeusz Wroński.

== Competitions ==
Szymon Krzeszowiec is a laureate of violin competitions in Poznań (Ogólnopolski Konkurs Skrzypcowy im. Z. Jahnkego), Warsaw (Konkurs na Skrzypce Solo im. T. Wrońskiego) and Brescia (Italy), of chamber music competition in Łódź (Konkurs Muzyki Kameralnej im. Kiejstuta Bacewicza).

== Artistic activity ==
Most recently, the artistic activity of Szymon Krzeszowiec is dominated by chamber performances, but his solo career still develops.

=== Soloist ===
As a soloist, he performed with such orchestras as : National Polish Radio Symphony Orchestra, Sinfonia Varsovia, Silesian Philharmonic (Symphony Orchestra), AUKSO Chamber Orchestra and many others. He played under the baton of conductors: Mirosław Jacek Błaszczyk, Jacek Boniecki, Leo Brouwer, Tomasz Bugaj, Szymon Bywalec, Sławomir Chrzanowski, Michał Dworzyński, Czesław Grabowski, Jan Wincenty Hawel, Michał Klauza, Jerzy Kosek, Marek Moś, Michał Nesterowicz, Grzegorz Nowak, Charles Olivieri-Munroe, Janusz Powolny, Ahmed el Saedi, Jerzy Salwarowski, Robert Satanowski, Tadeusz Strugała, Jerzy Swoboda, Tomasz Tokarczyk, Tadeusz Wicherek, Piotr Wijatkowski, Tadeusz Wojciechowski, Christoph Wyneken and Jan Miłosz Zarzycki.

=== Cooperation with pianists ===
For many years, Szymon Krzeszowiec has played with eminent pianists : Maria Szwajger-Kułakowska and Wojciech Świtała. With the latter, Krzeszowiec recorded his first CD, containing the three Piano & Violin Sonatas by Johannes Brahms. It was published in 2001 by the Sony Classical label. This album was nominated to the « Fryderyk » award as the best chamber music recording.

In 2011, he recorded another violin & piano CD, with a leading Swedish pianist, Niklas Sivelöv. This album, named « Fratres », contains pieces inspired by baroque music, written by 20th century composers. It has been published by the DUX label.

=== Silesian String Quartet ===
Since 2001, Szymon Krzeszowiec has been the first violinist of the Silesian String Quartet. Rehearsals, recordings and performances as a member of this ensemble have become his most important activities. As a chamber musician, Krzeszowiec played with such artists as, among others : Max Artved, Detlef Bensman, Bruno Canino, Dmitri Ferschtman, Maciej Grzybowski, Paul Gulda, Krzysztof Jabłoński, Krzysztof Jakowicz, Andrzej Jasiński, Jadwiga Kotnowska, Ralph Kirshbaum, Mats Lidstroem, Waldemar Malicki, Vladimir Mendelssohn, Tomasz Miczka, Bartłomiej Nizioł, Janusz Olejniczak, Bruno Pasquier, Piotr Pławner, Ewa Pobłocka, Dominik Połoński, Niklas Sivelöv, Jan Stanienda, Tomasz Strahl, Piotr Szymyślik, Marek Toporowski. He performed or/and recorded with such ensembles as Dominant, Lutosławski, Royal, Stamic, Vanbrugh and Wieniawski string quartets.

On the 15 CDs recorded by the Silesian String Quartet with Krzeszowiec as the first violinist, there are mainly pieces by Polish composers of the last 30 years. Chamber music of this period of Polish music is often performed by the Silesian String Quartet, as promoting contemporary music is one of the aims of the ensemble. In 2002, the Silesian String Quartet won the prestigious « Orfeusz » Award, given by the Association of Polish Musicians, for having premiered Witold Szalonek’s Symphony of rituals on the « Warsaw Autumn » Festival.

=== Aristos Trio ===
While studying in such a cultural centre as Amsterdam, Szymon Krzeszowiec met Danish musicians Jakob Kullberg (cello) and Alexander Øllgaard (viola). Since 2004, they have performed as the Trio Aristos. In 2006, this ensemble won prestigious chamber music competitions in Copenhagen (Denmark) and Sondershausen (Germany). In Denmark, the Trio Aristos was contacted by the composer Per Nørgård, who asked the musicians to premiere some of his works.

==== Teaching ====
Since 1998, Szymon Krzeszowiec is a pedagogue of the Karol Szymanowski Academy of Music in Katowice. He teaches at the Karol Szymanowski Secondary Musical School as well. Annually since 2004, he has given chamber music master classes at the International Princess Daisy Chamber Arts Festival Ensemble. Often, Krzeszowiec gives violin master classes and works in juries of musical competitions.

==== Discography ====
Year	Album details	Recorded works	Label
2011	FRATRES; Szymon Krzeszowiec - violin Niklas Sivelöv - piano	Igor Stravinski - Suite d’après les thèmes, fragments et morceaux de Giambattista Pergolesi; Luigi Dallapiccola - Tartiniana Seconda; Max Reger - Suite im alten Stil, op. 93; Arvo Pärt - Fratres; Alfred Schnittke - Suite im alten Stil, op. 80	DUX 0840
2010	ALEKSANDER TANSMAN; TOMBEAU DE CHOPIN from trio to octet vol.2 Joanna Liberadzka - harp Elżbieta Mrożek-Loska - viola Krzysztof Firlus - double bass Adam Krzeszowiec - cello Jan Krzeszowiec - flute Roman Widaszek - clarinet Silesian String Quartet	Aleksander Tansman: Sextuor à cordes for 2 violins, 2 violas and 2 cellos Sonatina da camera for flute, violin, viola, cello and harp Tombeau de Chopin for string quintet Trois pieces for clarinet, harp and string quartet	Stowarzyszenie Promocji Kultury im. Aleksandra Tansmana www.tansman.lodz.pl
2010	STANISŁAW KRUPOWICZ - “TYLKO BEATRYCZE” String quartets and computer Silesian String Quartet	Stanisław Krupowicz: Goodbye variations on a theme by Mozart; Tylko Beatrycze (Only Beatrice); Prolongement	Musica Pro Bono Foundation FMPB CD004
2010	RAFAŁ AUGUSTYN; DO UT DES MUSIC FOR AND WITH QUARTET; Agata Zubel - soprano Jan Krzeszowiec - flute Silesian String Quartet	Rafał Augustyn: String Quartet No.1; String Quartet No.2 with flute Dedication for soprano & string quartet Do ut des for string quartet Grand jeté. Quartet No.2½ with electronics	www.cdaccord.com.pl www.universalmusic.pl ACD 165-2
2009	KALEIDOSCOPE; Polish contemporary music for violin solo Szymon Krzeszowiec - violin	K. Meyer - Sonata op. 36; S. Moryto - Aria e Chorale; P. Szymański - Kaleidoscope for M.C.E; K. Penderecki - Cadenza; T. Wielecki - Przędzie się nić...II; E. Knapik - Filo d’Arianna; W. Szalonek - Chaconne-Fantaisie	DUX 0688
2009	STRING QUARTETS / POLAND ABROAD; Silesian String Quartet	Joachim Mendelson (1897–1943): String Quartet no.1 Roman Padlewski (1915–1944): String Quartet no.2 Simon Laks (1901–1983): String Quartet no.5	www.eda-records.com EDA 34
2009	GET STRING Danish contemporary string quartets Silesian String Quartet	Jens Voigt-Lund: Circuitous, Mountains (1999); Morten Riis: getString (2009); Christian Winther Christensen: String Quartet (2002–03); Morten Riis: fromString (2009); Jexper Holmen: Intend/Ascend (2000/02); Morten Riis: useString (2009); Simon Steen-Andersen: String Quartet (1999); Morten Riis: toString (2009); Simon Christensen: Towards Nothingness (2008); Morten Riis: quitString (2009)	dacapo CD 8.226530
2008	ANDRZEJ DZIADEK - chosen works Silesian String Quartet	A. Dziadek: String quartet no. 2	Polskie Radio Katowice PRK CD086
2008	HELENA TULVE - LIJNEN Silesian String Quartet various artists	H. Tulve: nec ros, nec pluvia... for string quartet	ECM New Series ECM 1955 476 6389 "Bestenliste der Deutschen Schallplattenkritik" 03/2008
2008	HENRYK MIKOŁAJ GÓRECKI - STRING QUARTETS Silesian String Quartet	H. M. Górecki: Already It Is Dusk, music for string quartet (String quartet no. 1) op. 62; Quasi una Fantasia (String quartet no. 2) op. 64...songs are sung (String quartet no. 3) op.67	EMI Music Poland EMI 50999 2 36313 2 8
2008	ANDRZEJ KRZANOWSKI IN MEMORIAM Silesian String Quartet; Agata Zubel - soprano	A. Krzanowski - Audition no. 6 for soprano and string quartet W. Widłak - ”Sotto voce”, Five songs for mezzo-soprano and string quartet R. Augustyn - Dedication for soprano and string quartet A. Krzanowski - String quartet no. 1, version B A. Lasoń - Relief for Andrzej	Musica Pro Bono Foundation FMPB CD003
2008	ALEKSANDER TANSMAN - OD TRIA DO OKTETU; VOL. 1 Chamber works Silesian String Quartet; Beata Bilińska - piano Piotr Szymyślik - clarinet	A. Tansman: Suite divertissement for piano quartet Musica a cinque for piano and string quartet Musique a six for clarinet, piano and strine quartet Musique for clarinet and string quartet	Stowarzyszenie Promocji Kultury im. A. Tansmana CD257
2007	ALEKSANDER LASOŃ Silesian String Quartet	A. Lasoń: String quartet no. 1 String quartet no. 3 String quartet no. 7	Musica Pro Bono Foundation FMPB CD001
2006	PAWEŁ SZYMAŃSKI; CHAMBER WORKS Silesian String Quartet; Krzysztof Jaguszewski - vibraphone Roman Widaszek - clarinet	P. Szymański: Five pieces for string quartet Compartment 2, Car 7 for string trio and vibraphone Two pieces for string quartet Recalling a Serenade for clarinet and string quartet A Photo from the Birthday Party (The Silesian String Quartet with a Shadow of Bartók)	EMI Music Poland EMI 0946 3 84393 2 5
2006	ALEKSANDER LASOŃ Silesian String Quartet	Aleksander Lasoń: String quartet no. 5 Five and a half of a string quartet String quartet no. 6; 20 for 4	Polskie Radio Katowice PRK CD076
2005	REPUBLIQUE Silesian String Quartet; CD of the Year 2005 - Award of the "Hi-fi Muzyka" Magazine; CD nominated for the Fryderyk Award	songs composed by Grzegorz Ciechowski, arranged by Stefan Sendecki	EMI Music Poland EMI 0946 3 46038 2 9
2005	WITOLD LUTOSŁAWSKI / WITOLD SZALONEK Silesian String Quartet; Michał Górczyński - bass clarinet	W. Lutosławski: String quartet W. Szalonek: Inside? - Outside? for bass clarinet and string quartet Chaconne-Fantaisie for violin solo	Polskie Radio Katowice PRK CD069
2004	ERNEST CHAUSSON Bruno Canino - piano Piotr Pławner - violin Silesian String Quartet	E. Chausson: Concerto in D major op. 21 for piano, violin and string quartet String quartet in c minor op. 35	Polskie Radio Katowice PRK CD062
2004	ANDRZEJ KRZANOWSKI / ANDRZEJ PANUFNIK Silesian String Quartet; Dominik Połoński - cello Elżbieta Mrożek - viola	A. Krzanowski: Relief no. 5 for cello solo Reminiscenza for string quartet, version B String quartet A. Panufnik: Trans Of Thought for string sextet Song To The Virgin Mary for string sextet	Polskie Radio Katowice PRK CD065
2003	ANDRZEJ PANUFNIK / ANDRZEJ KRZANOWSKI Silesian String Quartet; CD nominated for the Fryderyk Award	A. Panufnik: String quartet no. 1 String quartet no. 2 String quartet no. 3 A. Krzanowski: Relief IX ”Scottish” for string quartet and tape	Polskie Radio Katowice PRK CD056
2003	WITOLD SZALONEK Silesian String Quartet	Witold Szalonek: 1+1+1+1 per 1-4 strumenti ad arco /version for violin and cello/ Symphony of rituals for string quartet 1+1+1+1 per 1-4 strumenti ad arco /version for string quartet/	Polskie Radio Katowice PRK CD058
2003	MAX E. KELLER Silesian String Quartet	Max E. Keller: 2 String Quartet (1995)	Musiques Suisses/Grammont Portrait; MGB CTS-M 84
2003	DANCES ...AND AFTER DANCES; Silesian String Quartet; CD nominated for the Fryderyk Award	Dances: Joseph Haydn - String Quartet in D - minor Op. 103; Alexander Glasunow - Valse from "Novelettes" op.15 Anatoly Liadov - Mazurka; Alexander Glazunov - Courante; Anton Webern - Rondo; Dmitri Shostakovich - Polka: Allegretto (1931); John Cage - Quodlibet; Igor Stravinsky - Dance from "Trois Pieces"; Astor Piazzolla - Four, for Tango...and after dances: Giacomo Puccini - Chrysanthemen; Ludwig van Beethoven - Prelude and Fugue in C Major; Nikolai Rimski-Korsakov - Fugue "Im Kloster"; Hugo Wolf - Italian Serenade in G Major WW XV/3; Anatoly Liadov - Fugue; Franz Schubert - Quartet Movement in C Minor; Krzysztof Penderecki - String Quartet No.2	Polskie Radio Katowice; PRK CD 054
2003	SALON BIELAJEWA Silesian String Quartet	A. Glazunov - Waltz from "Novelettes" op.15 A. Glazunov - Preludio e Fuga; N. Arcybushev - Serenade; J. Wihtol - Menuet; M. d'Osten-Sacken - Berceuse; A. Liadov - Mazurka; N. Sokolov - Scherzo; A. Liadov - Sarabande; A. Borodin - Scherzo; A. Glazunov - Courante; A. Liadov - Fugue; N. Sokołow, A. Głazunow, A. Liadov - Polka	Polskie Radio Katowice PRK CD048
2001	JOHANNES BRAHMS: PIANO & VIOLIN SONATAS; Szymon Krzeszowiec - violin Wojciech Świtała - piano	Johannes Brahms: Sonata in G major op. 78; Sonata in A major op. 100; Sonata in d minor op. 108	Sony Music Poland; SK 87712
