= Silesian String Quartet =

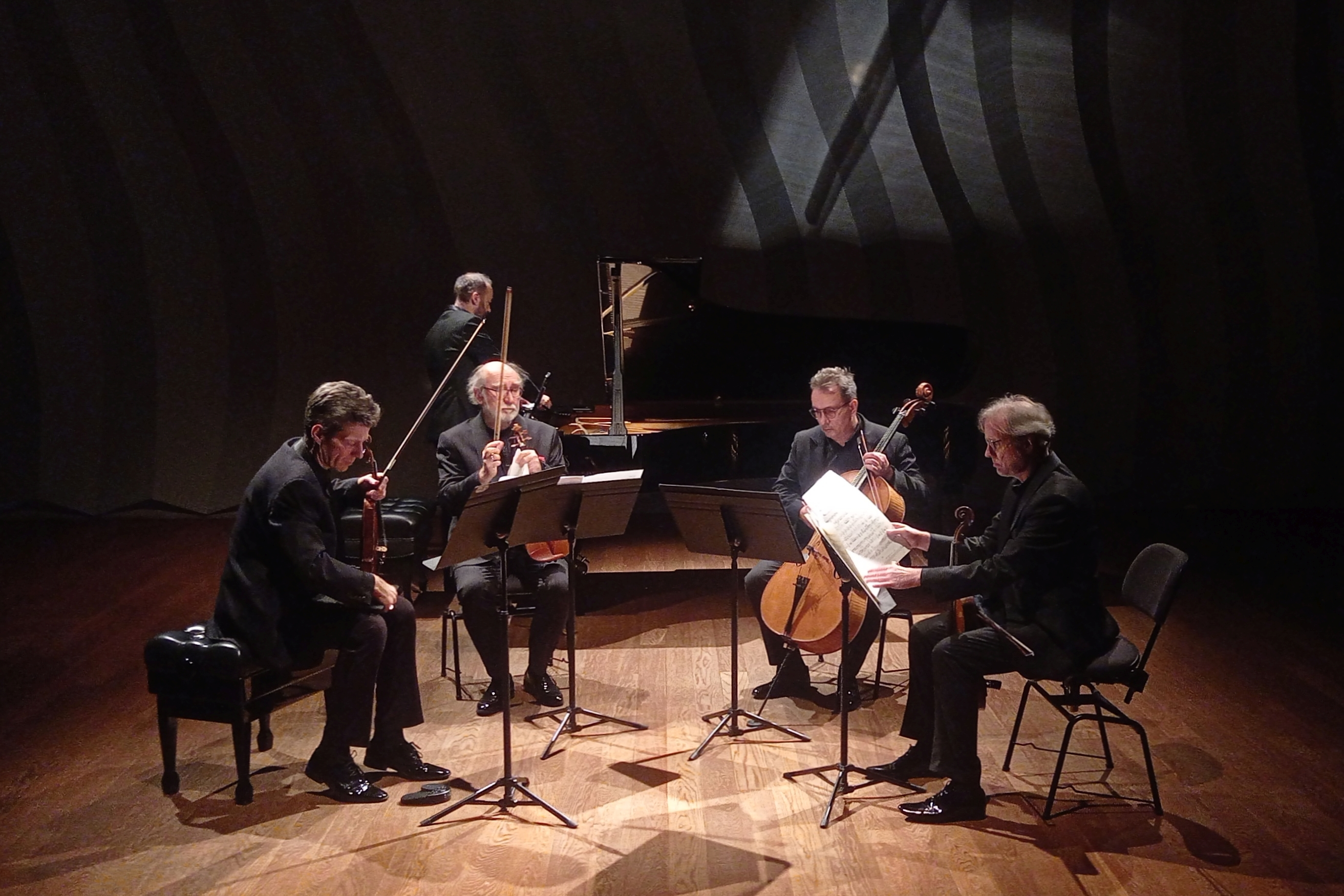
- Kwartet Śląski, NOSPR (2025)

Background information
- Origin: Katowice, Poland
- Genres: Contemporary classical
- Occupation: Chamber ensemble
- Years active: 1978–present
- Members: Szymon Krzeszowiec, violin Arkadiusz Kubica, violin Łukasz Syrnicki, viola Piotr Janosik, cello
- Past members: Marek Moś (original member, 1978–98), violin

The Silesian String Quartet is a string quartet founded in 1978 by the graduates of the Karol Szymanowski Academy of Music in Katowice, Poland. Its current members are:

- Szymon Krzeszowiec (violin I)
- Arkadiusz Kubica (violin II)
- Łukasz Syrnicki (viola)
- Piotr Janosik (cello)

== History ==
In 1978, graduates of the Karol Szymanowski Academy of Music in Katowice founded the Silesian String Quartet. They participated in masterclasses with such artists as, among others, the musicians of the LaSalle Quartet, Amadeus, Juilliard, Smetana and Alban Berg string quartets.

In 1993, the Silesian Quartet launched an annual chamber music festival held under the motto "Silesian Quartet and its guests".

Since 2005, the Self-Government of Gliwice has been the patron of The Silesian String Quartet and the Music Theatre of Gliwice has been its partner.

== Performances ==
=== Festivals ===
The ensemble performed at numerous festivals, including: Berliner Musiktage, Time of Music in Viitasaari (Finland), Kuhmo Chamber Music Festival (Finland), West Cork Chamber Music Festival (Ireland), Festiv´Alpes in Grenoble (France), Inventionen in Berlin, Musicorama in Hong Kong, Festival de Saint-Denis in Paris, Wien Modern (Austria), EuroArt in Prague (Czech Republic), Contemporary Music Festival Melos-Etos in Bratislava (Slovakia), Musique de Amitié Festival in Biel, Bornholms-Musik Festival, Musikhost in Odense and the World Music Days in Amsterdam, Warsaw Autumn (Poland), Penderecki Festival in Kraków (Poland), Poznań Music Spring (Poland), the Polish Contemporary Music Festival in Wrocław (Poland), Tongyeong International Music Festival (South Korea).

=== Concert halls ===
The Silesian String Quartet has given over 1000 concerts, attracting enthusiastic critical response, in many European countries, as well as the United States, Canada, Mexico, Japan and Hong Kong. It has appeared at some of the world's most prestigious concert halls including Concertgebouw in Amsterdam, Konzerthaus in Vienna, Vredenburg in Utrecht, De Unie in Rotterdam, De Singel in Antwerp, Schauspielhaus in Berlin, Tivoli in Copenhagen, Tonhalle in Düsseldorf, Wigmore Hall in London, Salle Pleyel in Paris, Merkin Hall and Carnegie Hall in New York City and Jordan Hall in Boston. The Silesian String Quartet also worked with radio stations in Germany (RIAS, SFB, WDR), the Netherlands (NOS), Greece and the Czech Republic.

=== Cooperation ===
The Silesian String Quartet performed with other eminent artists such as: Dmitri Ashkenazy, Andrzej Bauer, Eduard Brunner, Bruno Canino, Martin Frost, Stefan Kamasa, Jadwiga Kotnowska, Eugeniusz Knapik, Karri Krikku, Waldemar Malicki, Jerzy Marchwiński, Janusz Olejniczak, Piotr Pławner, Ewa Pobłocka, Ewa Podleś, Jadwiga Rappe, Hokan Rosengren, Jan Stanienda, Hary Sparnay, Wojciech Świtała, Marie-Pierre Langlamet, Krystian Zimerman.

== Repertoire ==
The Silesian String Quartet's repertoire includes over 300 pieces of chamber literature, of which almost 200 were written by 20th-century composers. More than 100 works, by Polish and foreign composers, were premiered by the Silesian String Quartet. These were, among other works:

- Rafał Augustyn – String quartet no. 2 (with flute, 1983)
- Stanisław Krupowicz – Only Beatrix (with tape, 1989)
- Grażyna Krzanowska – String quartets nos. 2 and 3
- Andrzej Krzanowski – Relief no. 9 (with tape, 1989), Reminiscenza B
- Aleksander Lasoń – String quartets nos. 2, 6 and 7
- Edward Sielicki – String quartet
- Witold Szalonek – Inside? Outside? (with bass clarinet); Symphony of rituals (2002)
- Paweł Szymański – Five pieces for string quartet (1992)
- Eugeniusz Knapik – String quartet (1980)
- VSTO [version 1] – String quartet (1989)

== Awards and decorations ==
The Silesian Quartet was awarded many prizes at international musical competitions got a number of Polish awards and decorations, including:

- 2008 Medal for Merit to Culture - Gloria Artis
- 2005: "CD of the year 2005", « Hi-Fi Muzyka» Magazine (the album « Republique »)
- 2002: Warsaw Autumn Music Award "Orfeusz"
- 1999: Gold Cross of Merit (Poland)
- 1998: honorary badge Meritorious Activist of Culture
- 1996, 1998, 2005: Polish CD Award "Fryderyk" for recordings of works by Henryk Mikołaj Górecki, Witold Lutosławski, Karol Szymanowski and Ernest Chausson
- 1992: Mayor of Katowice’s Artistic Award
- 1990: Stanisław Wyspiański Award for Young Artists
- 1988: Katowice Province Governor Artistic Award
- 1984, 1988: UNESCO International Composers´ Rostrum for the recording of string quartets by Eugeniusz Knapik and Aleksander Lasoń
- 1981: Poznań Music Spring (1981)
- 1979: Contemporary Music Competition in Kraków

== Discography ==
Year	Album details	Recorded works	Label
2011	GRAZYNA BACEWICZ COMPLETE STRING QUARTETS; Chamber music album of 2 CDs	String quartets #1 through #7	Chandos
2011	STALOWA WOLA GENERATION Chamber music album of 6 CDs Agata Zubel – soprano Maria Grochowska – flute Jadwiga Czarkowska – clarinet Mirosław Neinert – reciting Krzysztof Jaguszewski – percussion Piotr Połaniecki – percussion Michał Klauza – conductor Witold Serafin – viola Józef Gomolka – cello Marek Moś – violin Silesian String Quartet	Andrzej Krzanowski; Aleksander Lasoń; Eugeniusz Knapik; Music with string quartet	Stowarzyszenie Musica Pro Bono www.musicaprobono.org.pl
2010	ALEKSANDER TANSMAN TOMBEAU DE CHOPIN from trio to octet vol.2 Joanna Liberadzka – harp Elżbieta Mrożek-Loska – viola Krzysztof Firlus – double bass Adam Krzeszowiec – cello Jan Krzeszowiec – flute Roman Widaszek – clarinet Silesian String Quartet	Aleksander Tansman: Sextuor á cordes for 2 violins, 2 violas and 2 cellos Sonatina da camera for flute, violin, viola, cello and harp Tombeau de Chopin for string quintet Trois pieces for clarinet, harp and string quartet	Stowarzyszenie Promocji Kultury im. Aleksandra Tansmana www.tansman.lodz.pl
2010	RAFAŁ AUGUSTYN DO UT DES MUSIC FOR AND WITH QUARTET; Agata Zubel – soprano Jan Krzeszowiec – flute Silesian String Quartet	Rafał Augustyn: String Quartet No.1; String Quartet No.2 with flute Dedication for soprano & string quartet Do ut des for string quartet Grand jeté. Quartet No.2½ with electronics	www.cdaccord.com.pl www.universalmusic.pl ACD 165-2
2010	STANISŁAW KRUPOWICZ – “TYLKO BEATRYCZE” String quartets and computer Silesian String Quartet	Stanisław Krupowicz: Goodbye variations on a theme by Mozart; Tylko Beatrycze (Only Beatrix); Prolongement	Musica Pro Bono Foundation FMPB CD004
2009	GET STRING Danish contemporary string quartets Silesian String Quartet	JENS VOIGT-LUND: Circuitous, Mountains (1999); MORTEN RIIS: getString (2009); CHRISTIAN WINTHER CHRISTENSEN: String Quartet (2002–03); MORTEN RIIS: fromString (2009); JEXPER HOLMEN: Intend/Ascend (2000/02); MORTEN RIIS: useString (2009); SIMON STEEN-ANDERSEN: String Quartet (1999); MORTEN RIIS: toString (2009); SIMON CHRISTENSEN: Towards Nothingness (2008); MORTEN RIIS: quitString (2009)	dacapo CD 8.226530
2009	STRING QUARTETS / POLAND ABROAD Silesian String Quartet	Joachim Mendelson (1897-1943): String Quartet no.1 Roman Padlewski (1915-1944): String Quartet no.2 Simon Laks (1901-1983): String Quartet no.5	www.eda-records.com EDA 34
2008	ALEKSANDER TANSMAN – OD TRIA DO OKTETU VOL. 1 Chamber works Silesian String Quartet; Beata Bilińska – piano Piotr Szymyślik – clarinet	A. Tansman: Suite divertissement for piano quartet Musica a cinque for piano and string quartet Musique a six for clarinet, piano and strine quartet Musique for clarinet and string quartet	Stowarzyszenie Promocji Kultury im. A. Tansmana CD257
2008	ANDRZEJ DZIADEK – chosen works Silesian String Quartet	A. Dziadek: String quartet no. 2	Polskie Radio Katowice PRK CD086
2008	HELENA TULVE – LIJNEN Silesian String Quartet various artists	H. Tulve: nec ros, nec pluvia... for string quartet	ECM New Series ECM 1955 476 6389 "Bestenliste der Deutschen Schallplattenkritik" 03/2008
2008	HENRYK MIKOŁAJ GÓRECKI – STRING QUARTETS Silesian String Quartet	H. M. Górecki: Already It Is Dusk, music for string quartet (String quartet no. 1) op. 62; Quasi una Fantasia (String quartet no. 2) op. 64...songs are sung (String quartet no. 3) op.67	EMI Music Poland EMI 50999 2 36313 2 8
2008	ANDRZEJ KRZANOWSKI IN MEMORIAM Silesian String Quartet; Agata Zubel – soprano	A. Krzanowski – Audition no. 6 for soprano and string quartet W. Widłak – ”Sotto voce”, Five songs for mezzo-soprano and string quartet R. Augustyn – Dedication for soprano and string quartet A. Krzanowski – String quartet no. 1, version B A. Lasoń – Relief for Andrzej	Musica Pro Bono Foundation FMPB CD003
2007	ALEKSANDER LASOŃ Silesian String Quartet	A. Lasoń: String quartet no. 1 String quartet no. 3 String quartet no. 7	Musica Pro Bono Foundation FMPB CD001
2006	PAWEŁ SZYMAŃSKI CHAMBER WORKS; Silesian String Quartet; Krzysztof Jaguszewski – vibraphone Roman Widaszek – clarinet	P. Szymański: Five pieces for string quartet Compartment 2, Car 7 for string trio and vibraphone Two pieces for string quartet Recalling a Serenade for clarinet and string quartet A Photo from the Birthday Party (The Silesian String Quartet with a Shadow of Bartók)	EMI Music Poland EMI 0946 3 84393 2 5
2006	ALEKSANDER LASOŃ Silesian String Quartet	A. Lasoń: String quartet no. 5 ”Five and a half of a string quartet” String quartet no. 6; 20 for 4	Polskie Radio Katowice PRK CD076
2005	REPUBLIQUE Silesian String Quartet CD of the Year 2005 – Award of the "Hi-fi Muzyka" Magazine; CD nominated for the Fryderyk Award	songs composed by Grzegorz Ciechowski arranged by Stefan Sendecki	EMI Music Poland EMI 0946 3 46038 2 9
2005	WITOLD LUTOSŁAWSKI / WITOLD SZALONEK Silesian String Quartet; Michał Górczyński – bass clarinet	W. Lutosławski: String quartet W. Szalonek: Inside? – Outside? for bass clarinet and string quartet Chaconne-Fantaisie for violin solo	Polskie Radio Katowice PRK CD069
2004	ERNEST CHAUSSON Bruno Canino – piano Piotr Pławner – violin Silesian String Quartet	E. Chausson: Concerto in D major op. 21 for piano, violin and string quartet String quartet in c minor op. 35	Polskie Radio Katowice PRK CD062
2004	ANDRZEJ KRZANOWSKI / ANDRZEJ PANUFNIK Silesian String Quartet; Dominik Połoński – cello Elżbieta Mrożek – viola	A. Krzanowski: Relief no. 5 for cello solo Reminiscenza for string quartet, version B String quartet A. Panufnik: "Trans Of Thought" for string sextet "Song To The Virgin Mary" for string sextet	Polskie Radio Katowice PRK CD065
2003	SALON BIELAJEWA Silesian String Quartet	A. Glazunov – Waltz from "Novelettes" op.15 A. Glazunov – Preludio e Fuga; N. Arcybuszew – Serenade; J. Wihtol – Menuet; M. d'Osten-Sacken – Berceuse; A. Liadow – Mazurka; N. Sokolov – Scherzo; A. Liadow – Sarabande; A. Borodin – Scherzo; A. Glazunov – Courante; A. Liadow – Fuga; N. Sokołow, A. Głazunow, A. Liadow – Polka	Polskie Radio Katowice PRK CD048
2003	MAX E. KELLER Silesian String Quartet	Max E. Keller: 2 String Quartet (1995)	Musiques Suisses/Grammont Portrait MGB CTS-M 84
2003	DANCES ...AND AFTER DANCES Silesian String Quartet CD nominated for the Fryderyk Award	Dances: Joseph Haydn – String Quartet D- minor Op. 103; Alexander Glasunow – Valse from "Novelettes" op.15 Anatoly Liadow – Mazurka; Alexander Glazunov – Courante; Anton Webern – Rondo; Dmitri Shostakovich – Polka: Allegretto (1931); John Cage – Quodlibet; Igor Stravinsky – Dance from "Trois Pieces"; Astor Piazzolla – Four, for Tango...and after dances: Giacomo Puccini – Chrysanthemen; Ludwig van Beethoven – Prelude and Fugue in C Major; Nikolai Rimski-Korsakov – Fugue "Im Kloster"; Hugo Wolf – Italian Serenade in G Major WW XV/3; Anatoly Liadow – Fugue; Franz Schubert – Quartet Movement in C Minor; Krzysztof Penderecki – String Quartet No.2	C&P POLSKIE RADIO KATOWICE S.A PRK CD 054
2003	ANDRZEJ PANUFNIK / ANDRZEJ KRZANOWSKI Silesian String Quartet CD nominated for the Fryderyk Award	A. Panufnik: String quartet no. 1 String quartet no. 2 String quartet no. 3 A. Krzanowski: Relief IX ”Scottish” for string quartet and tape	Polskie Radio Katowice PRK CD056
2003	WITOLD SZALONEK Silesian String Quartet	W. Szalonek: 1+1+1+1 per 1-4 strumenti ad arco /version for violin and cello/ Symphony of rituals for string quartet 1+1+1+1 per 1-4 strumenti ad arco /version for string quartet/	Polskie Radio Katowice PRK CD058
2001	GENERATION '51 Silesian String Quartet	Aleksander Lasoń – String Quartet No 2 (1987); Andrzej Krzanowski – String Quartet No 2 (1978); Eugeniusz Knapik – String Quartet (1980)	POLSKIE RADIO KATOWICE S.A. PRK CD027
2001	CLASSIC AND CONTEMPORARY Silesian String Quartet	Ludwig van Beethoven – String Quartet in F-minor op.95 "Serioso"; Felix Mendelssohn-Bartholdy – String Quartet in F-minor op.80 Aleksander Lasoń – String Quartet No.4 "Tarnogórski"	POLSKIE RADIO KATOWICE S.A. PRK CD042
2000	FRYDERYK CHOPIN: Piano concerto No. 1 Kornelia Ogórkówna – piano Silesian String Quartet	Fryderyk Chopin: Piano concerto No 1 E-minor op.11	RECITAL COMPANY PRODUCTIONS (BELGIUM) RCP 011
1999	GRAŻYNA BACEWICZ Silesian String Quartet; Wiaczesław Nowikow – piano and other artists	Grażyna Bacewicz: Piano Quintet No.1 (1952)	C&P POLSKIE RADIO S.A. WARSZAWA PRCD 126
1998	MINIATURES OF THE 20TH CENTURY Silesian String Quartet	Charles Ives – Scherzo (1903–04); Anton Webern: Langsamer Satz (1905); Rondo (1906); Sechs Bagatellen Op.9 (1913); Igor Stravinski: Trois Pieces (1914); Concertino (1920); Double Canon (1959); John Cage – Quodlibet (1950); Dmitri Shostakovich – Elegy, Polka (1931); Alfred Schnittke – Canon in memoriam Henryk Czyż – Jazz etude Krzysztof Penderecki: Quartetto per archi No.2 (1968); Der Unterbrochene Gedanke (1988); Astor Piazzolla – For, for Tango (1987)	POLSKIE RADIO KATOWICE S.A. PRK 028
1998	THE MAGIC OF FUGUE Silesian String Quartet CD nominated for the "Fryderyk" Award	Ludwig van Beethoven: Prelude and fugue in F major Prelude and fugue in C major F. Mendelssohn-Bartholdy – Fugue op. 81; E. Grieg – Fugue in F minor Ludwig van Beethoven – Prelude and fugue in F minor for two violins and cello Nikolai Rimski-Korsakov – Fugue "Im Kloster"; A. Liadow – Fuga Mykolajus Ciurlionis – Fugue in F sharp minor Ludwig van Beethoven – Prelude and fugue in B flat minor for a string quintet Jean Sibelius – Fugue for Martin Wegelius; Alexander Glazunov – Prelude and fugue Ludwig van Beethoven – The Great Fugue op. 133	POLSKIE RADIO KATOWICE S.A. PRK 038
1997	KAROL SZYMANOWSKI, WITOLD LUTOSŁAWSKI: STRING QUARTETS; Silesian String Quartet "Fryderyk" Award for the best chamber music album of 1997; Award "CD of the year" of the "STUDIO" Magazine	Karol Szymanowski: String Quartet No. 1 String Quartet No. 2 Witold Lutosławski: String Quartet	CD ACCORD ACD 037
1997	STEFAN WOLPE Silesian String Quartet and other artists	Stefan Wolpe: String Quartet (1969)	CPO 999 090-2
1997	MINIATURES Silesian String Quartet CD nominated to the "Fryderyk" Award	J. Haydn – String Quartet D- minor Op. 103; W. A. Mozart – Adagio and Fuge in C- minor, KV546; F. Schubert – Quartettsatz c- moll, D 703; F. Mendelssohn-Bartholdy – Tema con variazioni Op. 81; A. Liadow – Sarabande; A. Borodin – Serenata alla spagnola G. Puccini – Chrysanthemen; S. Rachmaninoff – String Quartet No I H. Wolf – Italian Serenade in G- major WW XV/3	POLSKIE RADIO KATOWICE S.A. PRK 021
1997	JOHANNES BRAHMS – JULIUSZ ZARĘBSKI: PIANO QUINTETS; Paweł Kowalski – piano Silesian String Quartet CD nominated for the Fryderyk Award	Johannes Brahms: Piano quintet in F minor op. 34; Juliusz Zarębski: Piano quintet in G minor op. 34	POLSKIE NAGRANIA
1995	EMSDETTENER TOTENTANZ Silesian String Quartet and other artists	William Thomas McKinley: Emsdettener Totentanz	MMC Recordings MMC 2046
1995	VI SILESIAN DAYS OF CONTEMPORARY MUSIC 1994 Silesian String Quartet	Andrzej Krzanowski: Reminiscenza b for a string quartet	ZKP / Katowice ZKP KE 001
1994	FESTIVAL MUSIQUE ET AMITIE Silesian String Quartet and other artists	Claude Debussy: Quatuor en sol mineur, Op.10 (live recording)	R&C SONORIS RECORDS SCD 105
1994	WOLFGANG AMADEUS MOZART Silesian String Quartet	W. A. Mozart: Divertimento D- major KV 136; String Quartet G- major KV 387; String Quartet B- major KV 458	POLSKIE RADIO KATOWICE PRK 008
1994	ZYGMUNT KRAUZE Silesian String Quartet	Zygmunt Krauze: Quatuor a cordes No.3; Stone Music for piano Quatuor a cordes No.2; Quintette pour piano	THESIS PARIS TH 82059
1994	KRZYSZTOF PENDERECKI: MUSICA DA CAMERA; Silesian String Quartet	Krzysztof Penderecki: Quartetto per archi No.1; Quartetto per archi No.2; Streichtrio; Der unterbrochene Gedanke	WERGO SCHALPLATTEN GMBH MAINZ WER 6258-2
1995	HENRYK MIKOŁAJ GÓRECKI Silesian String Quartet	Henryk Mikołaj Górecki: Sonata, Op. 10, for Two Violins; Genesis I – Elementi per tre archi String Quartet No.1, Already It is Dusk, Op.62; String Quartet No.2, Quasi una Fantasia, Op. 64	OLIMPIA COMPACT DISCS Ltd.& SOUND-POL WARSAW OCD 375
1992	STRAVINSKY & SZYMANOWSKI: COMPLETE WORKS FOR STRING QUARTET Silesian String Quartet	Karol Szymanowski: String Quartet No.1; String Quartet No.2; Igor Stravinski: Trois pieces Concertino; Double Canon	PARTRIGE B.V. THE NETHERLANDS 1138-2
1992	ALEKSANDER TANSMAN: COMPLETE MUSIC FOR STRING QUARTET Silesian String Quartet	CD 1.: Aleksander Tansman: String Quartet No.2; String Quartet No.3; String Quartet No.4; String Quartet No.5; CD 2.: Aleksander Tansman; Triptyque String Quartet No.6; String Quartet No.7; String Quartet No.8	ETCETERA RECORDS B.V.AMSTERDAM KTC 2017
