= Karol Szymanowski International Music Competition =

- Awarded for: Classical music performance or composition
- Sponsored by: Polish Ministry of Culture and National Heritage, City of Katowice, Polskie Radio, Karol Szymanowski Academy of Music (Katowice), Karol Szymanowski Music Society (Zakopane)
- Venue: Karol Szymanowski Academy of Music, Katowice
- Country: Poland
- Presented by: Polish National Radio Symphony Orchestra
- First award: 2018
- Website: Szymanowski Competition

The Karol Szymanowski International Music Competition, also known simply as the Szymanowski Competition, is an international competition for classical music held annually in Katowice, Poland. Founded in 2018 by Joanna Wnuk-Nazarowa and the Karol Szymanowski Academy of Music, the competition holds a particular emphasis on showcasing the music of Polish composer Karol Szymanowski. It is held in four performance categories: piano, violin, voice and string quartet, with a separate composition competition also held simultaneously. In previous editions, the competition has featured over 500 contestants from at least 24 different countries.

== Editions ==
=== First Edition (2018) ===
The Szymanowski Competition held its first edition in 2018. The founder of the competition, Joanna Wnuk-Nazarowa, was the Competition Director, and the Honorary Committee also included late Polish composer Krzysztof Penderecki and British conductor Sir Simon Rattle.

=== Second Edition (2023) ===
The competition was held a second time in Katowice in January 2023, five years after the first. In reaction to the 2022 Russian invasion of Ukraine, the competition's director, Ewa Bogusz-Moore, released a statement declaring that all Russian music would be banned from the competition until further notice, given "the sensitivity to Russian culture present in Poland and as a gesture of solidarity with the Ukrainian people."

=== Third Edition (2027) ===
The 3rd Edition of the Szymanowski Competition will be held once again in Katowice from the 1st to the 19th of September 2027. The four performance categories are planned to be maintained as such, and over 300.000€ will once again be made available.

== Rounds and repertoire ==
The obligatory repertoire varies according to performance category, but always includes multiple works by Karol Szymanowski.

=== Piano ===
The piano competition is structured in three rounds: the first two of solo piano performance, and the last one featuring piano concertos played with the Polish National Radio Symphony Orchestra.

The first round, of a duration of 25–30 minutes, generally including the performance of etudes (Op. 4) and mazurkas (Op. 50) by Karol Szymanowski and larger works by Frédéric Chopin such as the Ballades, Polonaises or Fantaisie in F minor.

The second round, which lasts just under an hour, includes the performance of a piano sonata by Ludwig van Beethoven and at least 20 minutes of music by Karol Szymanowski. The music can be selected from a large variety of proposed solo piano repertoire including, but not limited to, the 12 Études, Op. 33, two sets of variations (Op. 3 and 10), the cycles Métopes (Op. 29) and Masques (Op. 34), and the three piano sonatas (Opp. 8, 21 and 36). The second round also requires the performance of a specific work from a proposed list including composers Debussy, De Falla, Ravel, Bartók, Barber, Berg and Grażyna Bacewicz.

The third and final round features the obligatory performance of Karol Szymanowski's only concertante work for piano and orchestra, the Symphony No. 4 (or 'Symphonie concertante'), and an additional concerto to be chosen from:

- Béla Bartók – Piano Concerto No. 3, Sz. 119
- Andrzej Panufnik – Piano Concerto (1961-1983)
- Maurice Ravel – Piano Concerto in G major
- George Gershwin – Piano Concerto in F major

=== Violin ===
The violin competition is also structured in three rounds, the first two being recitals of violin and piano or solo violin, and the third featuring violin concertos played with the Polish National Radio Symphony Orchestra.

The first round (25-30 minute recital) includes the performance of one of the six Solo Violin Sonatas by Eugène Ysaÿe, as well as the Mythes (Op. 30) and Romance (Op. 23) by Karol Szymanowski for violin and piano.

The second round is also a recital, of a duration of 45 minutes to one hour. It features the obligatory performance of a full sonata for violin and piano to be chosen from a varied list including the violin sonatas of Beethoven, Mendelssohn, Schubert, Schumann, Fauré, Franck, Leleu, Brahms, Elgar, Strauss, Respighi, Ravel, Poulenc and Bartók. Additionally, a work of virtuoso character must be performed, such as Saint-Saëns' Introduction et rondo capriccioso, Chausson's Poème, Ravel's Tzigane or Lutosławski's Partita. Finally, the performer must execute a transcription for solo violin by Paweł Kochański of works written for other instruments, such as a solo transcription of Ravel's Pavane pour une infante défunte or Chopin's Nocturne in B major, op. 62 no. 1.

The third round, performed with orchestra, features the execution of one of Szymanowski's two violin concertos (Op. 35 and Op. 61) and an additional concerto to be chosen among four:

- Béla Bartók – Violin Concerto No. 2, Sz. 112
- Benjamin Britten – Violin Concerto in D minor, Op. 15
- Krzysztof Penderecki – Violin Concerto No. 1
- Mieczysław Weinberg – Violin Concerto in G minor, Op. 67

== Jury ==
The jury of the composition changes in part every year.

	Jury members		
	First Edition (2018)	Second Edition (2023)	Third Edition (2027)
Piano	(Poland) Andrzej Jasínki (Chair); (Poland) Joanna Domanska; (Russia) / (United States) Olga Kern; (Israel) Aviram Reichert; (United Kingdom) Martin Roscoe; (Hungary) Tamás Ungár	(Poland) Kevin Kenner (Chair); (Poland) Joanna Domanska; (South Korea) Sinae Lee; (United Kingdom) Jonathan Plowright; (Poland) Ewa Pobłowska; (France) / (Russia) Mikhail Rudy	
Violin	(Poland) Bartłomiej Nizioł (Chair); (Hungary) Eszter Haffner; (France) Laurent Korcia; (Poland) Szymon Krzeszowiec; (Russia) Alexander Trostiansky; (Austria) Andreas Vierziger	(Poland) Daniel Stabrawa (Chair); (Norway) Peter Herresthal; (Poland) Jakub Jakowicz; (Hungary) Barnabás Kelemen; (Poland) Szymon Krzeszowiec; (United Kingdom) Jennifer Pike; (China) / (United States) Qian Zhou	
Voice	(Poland) Jadwiga Rappé (Chair); (Poland) Ewa Biegas; (Germany) Hartmut Höll; (France) Bruno Michel; (Japan) Mitsuko Shirai; (Poland) Elżbieta Szmytka	(Germany) Dominik Licht (Chair); (Poland) Ewa Biegas; (Italy) Francesca Condeluci; (Germany) Melanie Diener; (Poland) Marcin Habela; (Austria) Thomas Mittermayer	
String Quartet	(Austria) Valentin Erben (Chair); (Poland) Krzysztof Chorzelski; (Denmark) Tim Frederiksen; (Poland) Tadeusz Gadzina; (Poland) Arkadiusz Kubica; (Sweden) Mats Lidström	(Austria) Peter Schuhmayer (Chair); (United States) Jonathan Brown; (France) Guy Danel; (Poland) Piotr Reichert; (Poland) Arkadiusz Kubica; (Poland) Izabella Szałaj-Zimak; (Belarus) Kyril Zlotnikov	
Composition	(Poland) Eugeniusz Knapik (Chair); (Poland) Krzysztof Penderecki; (Denmark) Jakob Kullberg; (Czech Republic) Martin Smolka	(Italy) Francesco Filidei (Chair); (Poland) Daniel Cichy; (Netherlands) Rozalie Hirs; (France) Yann Robin; (Estonia) Helena Tulve; (Poland) Agata Zubel	

== Laureates ==
Every year, the Szymanowski Competition hands out over 300.000€ in awards to various laureates. Additionally, special prizes are awarded, including the Special Prize for Best Performance of a Work By Karol Szymanowski and the Special Prize For Best Performance of a Contemporary Work.

		Laureates		
		First Edition (2018)	Second Edition (2023)	Third Edition (2027)
Piano	1st place, gold medalist(s)	(Poland) Tymoteusz Bies	(Japan) Kaho Araishi	Results TBD (19 September 2027)
Piano	2nd place, silver medalist(s)	(Poland) Mateusz Krzyżowski	(Poland) Krzysztof Wierciński	Results TBD (19 September 2027)
Piano	3rd place, bronze medalist(s)	(South Korea) Seung Hui Kim	(France) Gaspard Thomas	Results TBD (19 September 2027)
Piano	H*		(Poland) Daniel Aulak (Poland) Michał Batista (Singapore) Lily Phee	Results TBD (19 September 2027)
Violin	1st place, gold medalist(s)	(Poland) Sławomira Wilga	(Japan) Seina Matsukoa	Results TBD (19 September 2027)
Violin	2nd place, silver medalist(s)	(Poland) Roksana Kwaśnikowska	(Turkey) Elvin Hoxha Ganiyev	Results TBD (19 September 2027)
Violin	3rd place, bronze medalist(s)	(Slovenia) Maja Horvat	(Poland) Jakub Staszel	Results TBD (19 September 2027)
Violin	H*		(Poland) Sara Dragan	Results TBD (19 September 2027)
Voice	1st place, gold medalist(s)	(Poland) Ewa Tracz	(Poland) Magdalena Lucjan	Results TBD (19 September 2027)
Voice	2nd place, silver medalist(s)	(Poland) Sylwia Olszyńska	(Poland) Jan Żądło	Results TBD (19 September 2027)
Voice	3rd place, bronze medalist(s)	(South Korea) Agnieszka Jadwiga Grochala	Not awarded	Results TBD (19 September 2027)
String Quartet	1st place, gold medalist(s)	(Canada) Eliot Quartett	Not awarded	Results TBD (19 September 2027)
String Quartet	2nd place, silver medalist(s)	(Austria) Selini Quartet	(Switzerland) Turicum Quartet	Results TBD (19 September 2027)
String Quartet	3rd place, bronze medalist(s)	New Music Quartet	(Poland) Neuma Quartet	Results TBD (19 September 2027)

- *H: Honorable Mention
