= Oleksandr Shymko =

Ukrainian composer and pianist

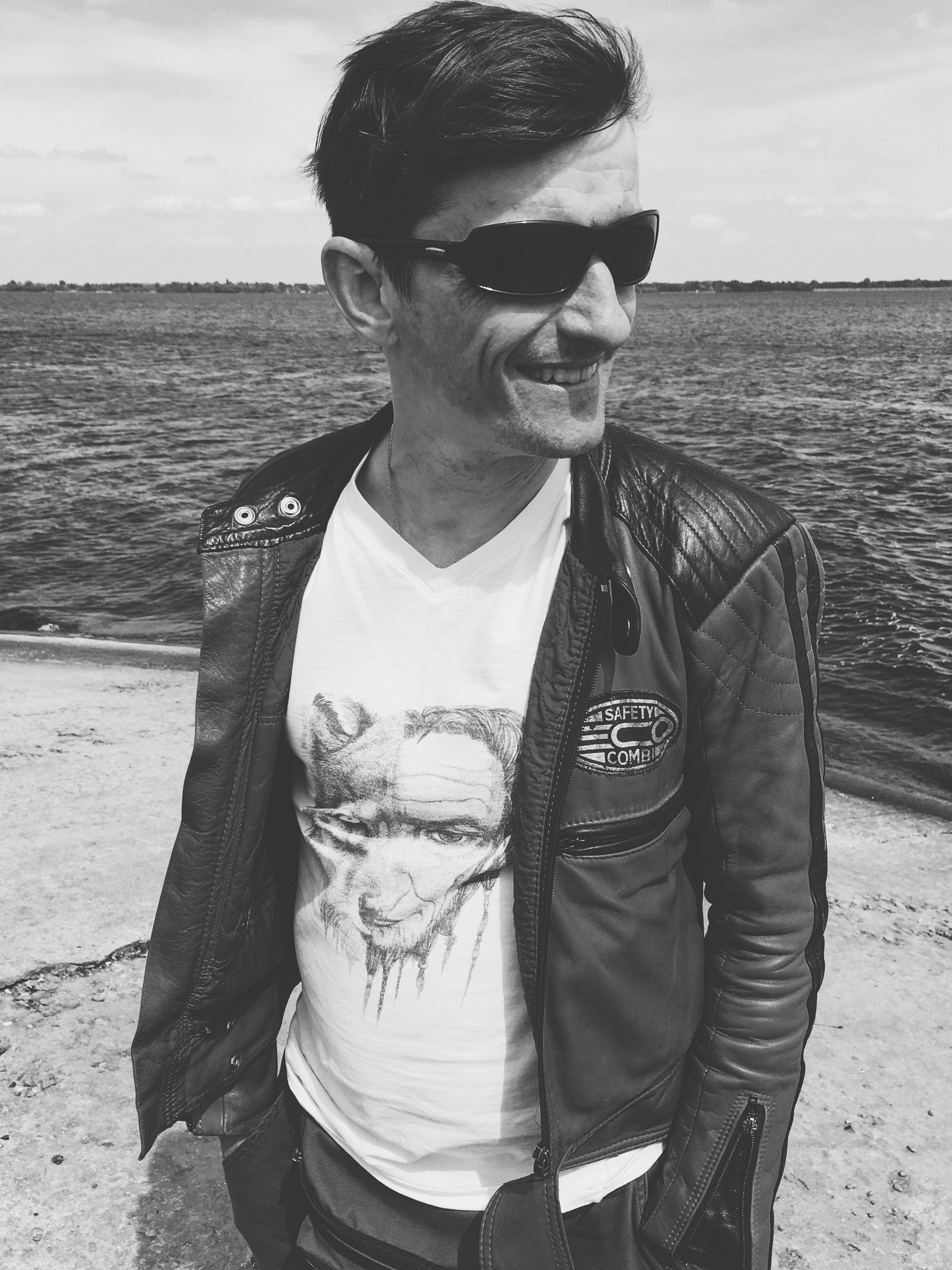
Oleksandr Shymko (2018)

Oleksandr Arturovych Shymko (Ukrainian: Шимко Олександр Артурович), born 4 August 1977 in Borshchiv, Ukraine, is a Ukrainian composer and pianist.

== Education and musical career ==
Oleksandr Shymko was born on August 4, 1977, in the town of Borshchiv in the Ternopil region of Ukraine. He graduated from the Chernivtsi Music School in the western Ukrainian city of Chernivtsi as a pianist. In 1998 he studied composition under Yuri Ischenko at the Kyiv Conservatory, graduating in 2002. From 2002 to 2005 he continued his studies at the academy as a post-graduate.

Shymko has been a member of the National Union of Composers of Ukraine since 2003; From 2004 to 2010, he was the chairman of the union's Kyiv youth association, he was awarded the Kyiv Mayor's Prize, and was awarded the Gaude Polonia scholarship by the Polish Ministry of Culture. In 2005 he began studying composition with Aleksander Lasoń at the Karol Szymanowski Academy of Music, in Katowice, Poland. In 2006 he was awarded a grant by the Ernst von Siemens Foundation.

In 2007, he was won the Levko Revutsky Prize, awarded by the Ministry of Culture of Ukraine.

In September 2007 Shymko joined the music department of the Lesia Ukrainka National Academic Russian Drama Theatre as its head of department. he was a committee member of the XI and XII International Forum "Youth Music" in 2009 and 2011, and set up the "Ethno-modernity" project in 2009.

== Performances ==
Many of Shymko's works have been performed in festivals, as “Music Season’s premieres” (2004, 2006 Kyiv), International Festival “Kyiv Music Fest” (2005), the 19th International Festival “Warsaw Musical Meetings”, 4th International Festival “New music”- Festiwal Muzyki Nowej (Bytom, Poland), 5th Summer Festival in Rycerka (Poland), "Contem-ucha"—a series of concerts of contemporary music in Lodz Philharmony (Poland), and others.

In 2008 he was the organizer and musical director of the "Musical Tribune of Kyiv Youth" festival.

The State National Academic Symphonic Orchestra of Ukraine, Ukrainian Radio Symphony Orchestra, Dnipropetrovsk House Of Organ And Chamber Music, and the Archi Chamber Orchestra have all performed Shymko's works.

== Selected works ==
=== Ballet ===
- The Sun's Chosen One (Обранець Сонця) (2007), libretto by Alla Rubina.

=== Orchestral ===
- Symphony No.1Trilogy of Life (Трилогія Життя) (2004–2005)
- Symphony No.2 Genesis (2006)
- Symphony No.3 Elysium (2010)
- Symphony No.4 (2013).
- Concerto No.1 for piano and orchestra (2001–2002)
- Concerto No.2 for piano and orchestra (2006–2007)
- Concerto for violin and symphony orchestra (2012)
- Concerto for violin, viola and symphony orchestra (2012)

=== Chamber orchestral music ===
- Hymn of Solitude (Гімн Самотності) for soprano and chamber orchestra (2007), text by Halina Poświatowska
- "Kallisti" for violin and string orchestra (2009)
- "Etnica" for trumpet and chamber orchestra (2009)
- "Elegium" for piano and string orchestra (2010)
- "Equilibrium" for authentic voice and chamber orchestra (2011)
- "OffLife" for electronics and chamber orchestra (2013)
- "Passion songs" for soprano and chamber orchestra (2013)

=== Chamber music ===
- Two Birds (Два Птахи) for two flutes (2004)
- Silence (Тиша) for piano and harp (2005)
- The Book of Night Secrets (Книга таємниць ночі) for flute, viola and harp (2005)
- "Ecstatics" for flute, oboe, clarinet, violin, viola, cello and piano (2010)
- "Birth" for piano and string quartet (2010)
- "Overground music" for soprano saxophone, violin, cello and piano (2013)
- "No Noise Music" for soprano, two flutes, oboe, clarinet, string quartet and piano (2014)

=== Music for piano ===
- Storm Petrel (Буревісник) (1997)
- Sharme (2002)
- Space (Пространства) (2007)

=== Choral ===
- Hymn to the Sun (Гімн сонцю) for chorus and orchestra (2003), text by Maximilian Voloshin
- Songs of the Sea (Пісні Моря) for a cappella chorus (2006–2007), text by Maria Druzhko
- Chronos for chorus and orchestra (2008)
