= Krzanowski =

Krzanowski (feminine Krzanowska, plural Krzanowscy) is a Polish surname. Notable people with the surname include:

- Andrzej Krzanowski (1951–1990), Polish composer and accordionist
- Grażyna Krzanowska (born 1952), wife of Andrzej Krzanowski
