= Zdzisław Piernik =

Polish virtuoso tuba player (born 1937)

- Born: 10 November 1937 (age 88); Toruń, Poland
- Genres: Classical, contemporary, intuitive, jazz
- Occupations: Soloist, instrumentalist, composer, teacher
- Instruments: Tuba, Prepared tuba
- Labels: Polskie Nagrania; ProViva / Intersound; Poljazz; Acte Préalable; Dux Records; Bôłt Records

Zdzisław Piernik (Polish: [ˈzd͡ʑiswaf ˈpiɛrɲk]; born 10 November 1937) is a Polish virtuoso tuba player.

== Biography ==
Zdzisław Piernik graduated from the Warsaw Academy of Music in the class of Juliusz Pietrachowicz. After being awarded at the 1970 National Festival of Young Musicians in Gdańsk he began his career as a soloist. Shortly afterwards he acquire success at recitals in the country and abroad, at festivals and holiday courses in Bayreuth, Witten, Darmstadt, Bourges, Stockholm, Los Angeles.

Piernik was the first tubist in Poland to implement flageolets, glissandos, frullatos and chords into his playing. He also began sonoristic experiments with prepared tuba. He is the inventor of the original preparation, remodelling the instrument to sound far from its natural tone.

Piernik worked closely with many composers demonstrating them the capabilities of the tuba, natural and prepared. As a soloist Piernik has taken part in hundreds of symphonic and chamber concerts, with extremely varied repertoire, starting from classical with his own transcriptions, ending with the newest acquisitions of contemporary music and his own compositions. His concerts, recordings and broadcasts for Polish Radio and television popularized playing on the tuba.

Piernik is designated as Lifetime Achievement Honorees of International Tuba Euphonium Association.

Piernik is still active, playing concerts and giving lectures.

== More important works ==
Classical Repertoire

- Luigi Boccherini: Minuet from String Quintet in E major, Op. 11, No. 5
- Franz Schubert: Serenade
- Robert Schumann: Traumerei
- Antonín Dvořák: Humoreske
- Henry Eccles: Sonata in G minor
- Ignacy Jan Paderewski: Minuet
- Modest Mussorgsky: Cattle ("Pictures at an Exhibition")
- Wolfgang Amadeus Mozart: Rondo in E-flat major for Horn, K. 371
- Camille Saint-Saëns: Morceau de Concert Op. 94, III. Allegro non-troppo
- Camille Saint-Saëns: Elephant, Swan (Carnival of the Animals)

Contemporary Repertoire

- Andrzej Dobrowolski: Music for Solo Tuba (1972)
- Elżbieta Sikora: Il Viaggio 1 (1975)
- Witold Szalonek: Piernikiana per Tuba Sola (1977)
- Marian Borkowski: Vox per uno strumento ad ottone (1977)
- Andrzej Krzanowski: Sonata for Solo Tuba (1978)
- Krzysztof Penderecki: Capriccio per tuba / Scherzzo alla polacca (1980)
- Bogusław Schaeffer: Projekt für Tuba und Tonband
- Roman W. Zajączek: (Note: Roman-Witold Zajączek (1927–1986). Polish composer. Member of German Composers Association. WorldCat Identity.) Tema cantabile con piernicazioni
- Zdzisław Piernik: Dialogue für Tuba und Tonband

== More important discography ==
- Zdzisław Piernik – Tuba (LP) Polskie Nagrania SX 1210, 1975
- Zdzisław Piernik – Piernik plays Sikora, Schäffer, Borkowski, Zajaczek, Piernik (Note: Title according to DNB Catalog. Also known as: Tuba Universale.) (LP) Intersound / ProViva ISPV 102, 1980
- Zdzisław Piernik – Tuba (Polish Contemporary Music series) (LP) Polskie Nagrania SX 1806, 1982
- Zdzisław Piernik, Michał Górczyński – Energa One (CD) Kariatyda, 2002
- Zdzisław Piernik, Piotr Zabrodzki – Namanga (CD) Vivo Records, 2008

== Bibliography ==
- Sebyła, Witold (1975). Zdzisław Piernik: Tuba (Note from LP cover) (in Polish and English). Polskie Nagrania Muza SX 1210.
- Kaczyński, Tadeusz (1984). Zdzisław Piernik: Tuba (Note from LP cover.) (in Polish and English). Polskie Nagrania Muza SX 1806.
- Mackiewicz, Lubomir; Żołna, Anna, eds. (1993). Kto jest kim w Polsce. Informator biograficzny (in Polish) (3 ed.). Warszawa: Interpress. p. 554. ISBN 8322326440. LCCN 94163349.
- Morris, R. Winston (2006). Guide to the Tuba Repertoire (2 ed.). Indiana University Press. ISBN 0253112257.
- Piernik, Justyna (2013). "Wszystko o moim ojcu. Portret Zdzisława Piernika" (Radio reportage from the cycle Stories After Dark) (in Polish). Polskie Radio Program II. Archived from the original on 3 May 2016.
- Krzywicki, Paul (2016). From Paderewski to Penderecki: The Polish Musician in Philadelphia. Lulu Publishing Services. pp. 282–283. ISBN 978-1483442679.
