= Józef Świder =

Polish composer and music teacher (1930–2014)

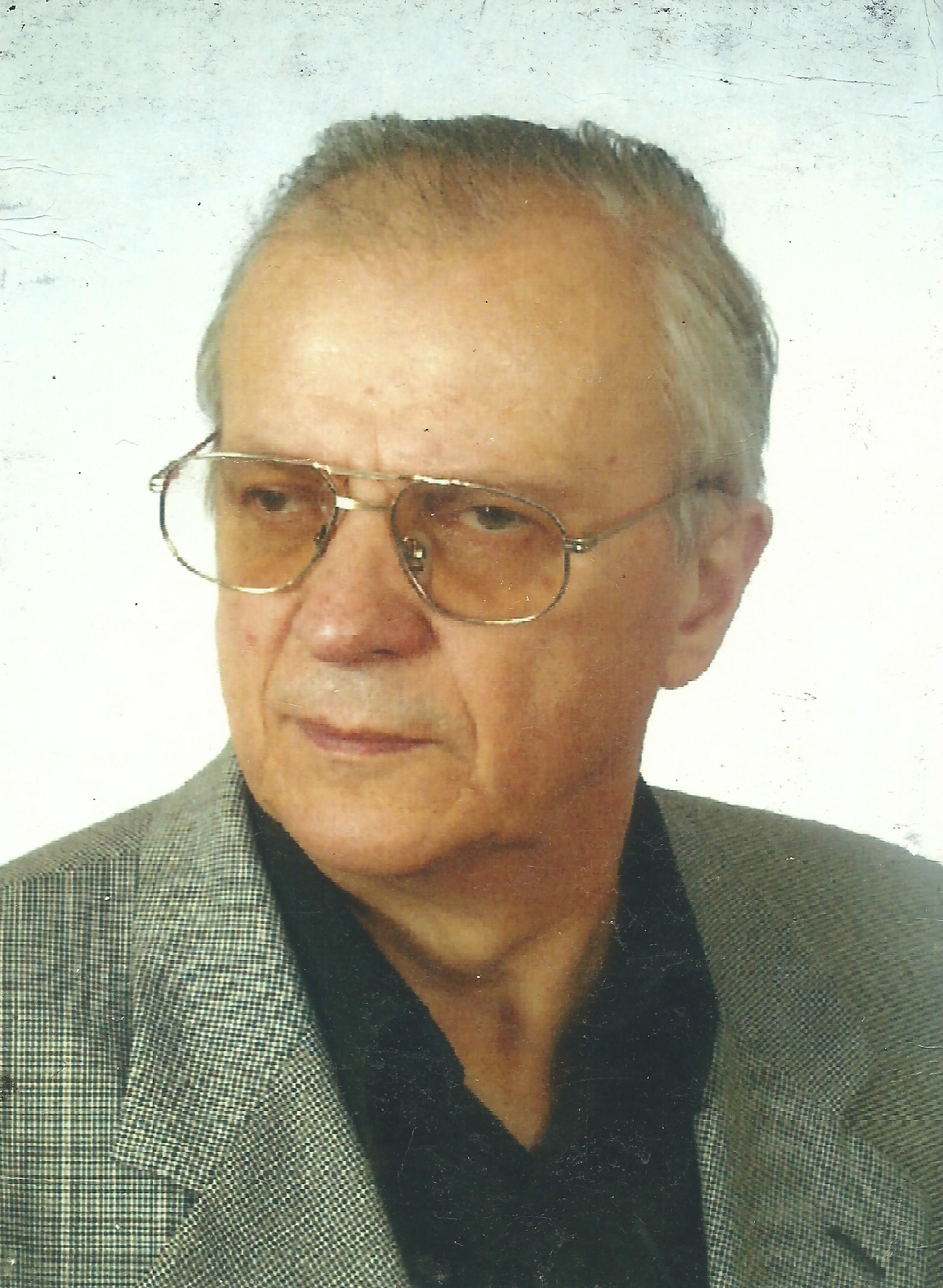
- Born: 19 August 1930; Czechowice-Dziedzice, Silesian Voivodeship, Poland
- Died: 22 May 2014 (aged 83); Katowice, Silesian Voivodeship, Poland

Józef Świder (born 19 August 1930 in Czechowice-Dziedzice, died 22 May 2014 in Katowice) was a Polish composer and music teacher.

He graduated from the Academy of Music in Katowice (formerly PWSM – today Akademia Muzyczna), then continued his studies with Goffredo Petrassi at the Accademia Nazionale di Santa Cecilia in Rome. Since 1954, he taught composition and music theory at the Akademia Muzyczna in Katowice. Among his pupils were the Polish composers Aleksander Lasoń, Julian Gembalski, Andrzej Dziadek and Wiesław Cieńciała. Professor at the University of Silesia (Uniwersytet Śląski) where, from 1985 until 1999, he managed the Institute for Music Education. Since 1984 professor of the postgraduate course for choir directors at the Akademia Muzyczna in Bydgoszcz. Member of the jury of numerous Polish and international choir competitions.

Józef Świder was the recipient of many awards, among them the Prize of Poland’s Prime Minister for his works for children. He was a member of the Union of Polish Composers (ZKP).

== Compositions ==
- more than 200 choral songs
- 3 operas: Magnus (1970), Wit Stwosz (Veit Stoss – 1974), Bal Baśni (The Fairy Tales Bal – 1977)
- Wokaliza (Vocalise) for soprano and viola (1953)
- Concerto for piano and orchestra (1955)
- Concerto for soprano and orchestra (1956)
- Suite for accordion and string orchestra (1979)
- 9 masses with organ or orchestra, including the Missa angelica (2009)
- Oratorium legnickie (Legnica Oratorio – 1991)
- Concerto for guitar and string orchestra (1998)
- Te Deum for solo voices, choir and orchestra (2001)
- Litania Gietrzwałdzka (Litany of Gietrzwałd – 2007)
- Singet dem Herrn ein neues Lied for 4 soloists, 2 choirs and orchestra (2014)

He wrote also chamber music, works for guitar, organ, wind orchestra, as well as music for theatre and film.
