= Kullberg =

Kullberg is a surname which may refer to:

- Anders Carlsson af Kullberg (1771–1851), Church of Sweden bishop and member of the Swedish Academy - see List of members of the Swedish Academy
- Boo Kullberg (1889–1962), Swedish gymnast in the 1912 Olympics
- Harold Albert Kullberg (1896–1924), American World War I flying ace
- Henrik Kullberg (1891–1953), Finnish politician and farmer
- Jakob Kullberg (born 1976), Danish cellist
- Karl Berndtsson Kullberg (1892–1943), Swedish chess player
- Rolf Kullberg (1930–2007), former governor of the Bank of Finland
- Stephan Kullberg (born 1959), Swedish former footballer

== See also ==
- Andy Kulberg (1944–2002), American bass guitarist and composer
