= Piernik =

- Piernik, Polish version of pryanik, a Slavic cookie
- Zdzisław Piernik, Polish virtuoso tuba player
