= Missa angelica =

- Mass by Józef Świder
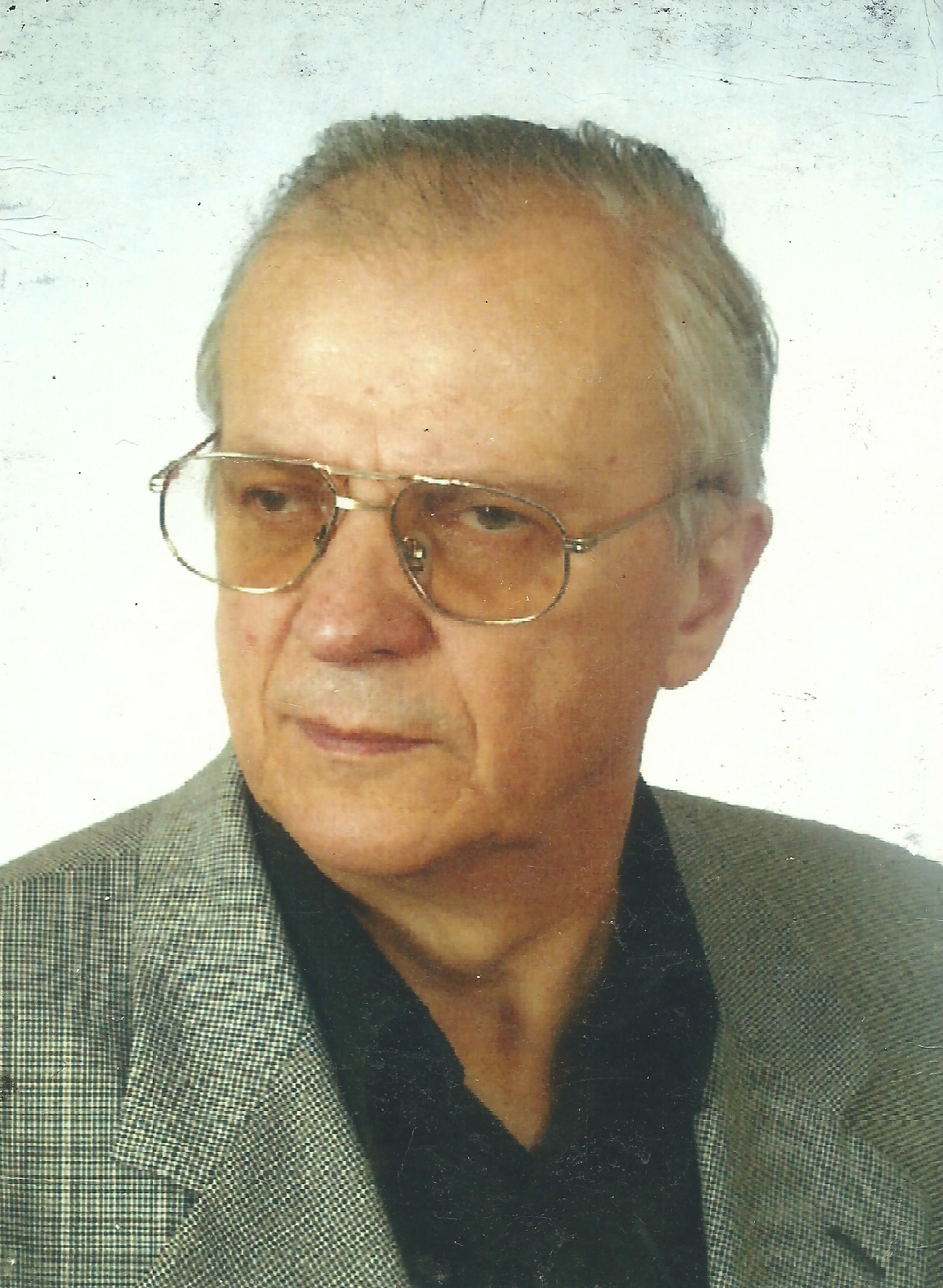
- The composer
- Text: Mass Ordinary
- Language: la
- Composed: 1998
- Published: 2009: Stuttgart
- Movements: seven
- Vocal: soprano (or tenor) solo; SATB choir
- Instrumental: string orchestra; percussion

The Missa angelica (Angelic Mass) is a mass composed by Józef Świder in 1998. He scored it for soprano or tenor solo, a four-part choir, string orchestra and percussion. He also wrote a version for women's choir and keyboard instrument (piano or organ). It was published by Carus-Verlag in 2009.

Świder is a Polish composer whose sacred music is popular in his home country and abroad. The title Missa angelica is often used for a mass connected to the annunciation by the archangel Gabriel. Świder set the complete liturgical text of the Mass Ordinary, and even the final "Ite missa est" with an added Alleluja.

== Structure ==
Świder structured the text in seven movements, which he marked for tempo in Italian:

1. Kyrie – Lento cantabile
2. Gloria – Allegretto vigoroso
3. Credo – Maestose, con moto
4. Sanctus – Maestoso
5. Benedictus – Adagio cantabile
6. Agnus Dei – Lento
7. Ite missa est – Allegretto vigoroso

The duration is given as 24 minutes.
