= Ewa Bogusz-Moore =

Polish cultural manager and cellist (born 1975)

Ewa Bogusz-Moore (born 1975 in Głogów) is a Polish cultural manager and cellist and is director of the Kölner Philharmonie.

== Life and work ==
After studying cello in Wrocław and cultural management at City University London, which she completed in London in 2005. She worked on various festival projects in the United Kingdom (such as the Sounds New Music Festival in Canterbury) and in Poland. She also worked in the music and theatre departments of the Polish Cultural Institute in London, which is dedicated to disseminating and promoting Polish culture abroad. There, she managed the youth ensemble "I, Culture Orchestra". She adjudicates on musical competition juries including the Paris conducting competition La Maestra; in 2023 she was director of the second Karol Szymanowski International Music Competition.

From 2018 until the end of July 2025, she was General and Program Director of the Polish National Radio Symphony Orchestra in Katowice.

Bogusz-Moore was deputy director at the Adam Mickiewicz Institute and responsible for the international marketing of Polish music. Since 2019, she has been a member of the European Concert Hall Organisation, becoming co-chair; in 2022, she served as co-director of the European Union Youth Orchestra.

On 1 August 2025, Ewa Bogusz-Moore took over the directorship of the Kölner Philharmonie and the management of KölnMusik Betriebs- und Servicegesellschaft ('KölnMusik Operations and Service Company') from Louwrens Langevoort, who had led the Philharmonie for 21 years.
