= Jerzy Sterczyński =

Polish pianist and piano teacher (born 1957)

Jerzy Sterczyński (born 1957) is a Polish pianist and piano teacher. Since 1989 he has been a professor at Fryderyk Chopin Music Academy in Warsaw and since 2005 - the head of the Piano, Harpsichord and Organ Department.

== Development ==
He started playing the piano when six years old and then attended Music High School in Bielsko-Biała. This was followed by piano study at the University of Music in Katowice in prof. Andrzej Jasiński's class from which he graduated in 1981. He continued his education in London with John Bingham. In 1983 he won the second prize at the International Pilar Bayona Piano Competition in Zaragoza.

== Works played ==
Sterczyński has performed and recorded works by Chopin on 13 CDs. He has also recorded works by Brahms, Liszt, Tchaikovsky, Dobrzyński, Lessel, Reger, Szymanowski and Wieniawski.
