= Przemysław Lechowski =

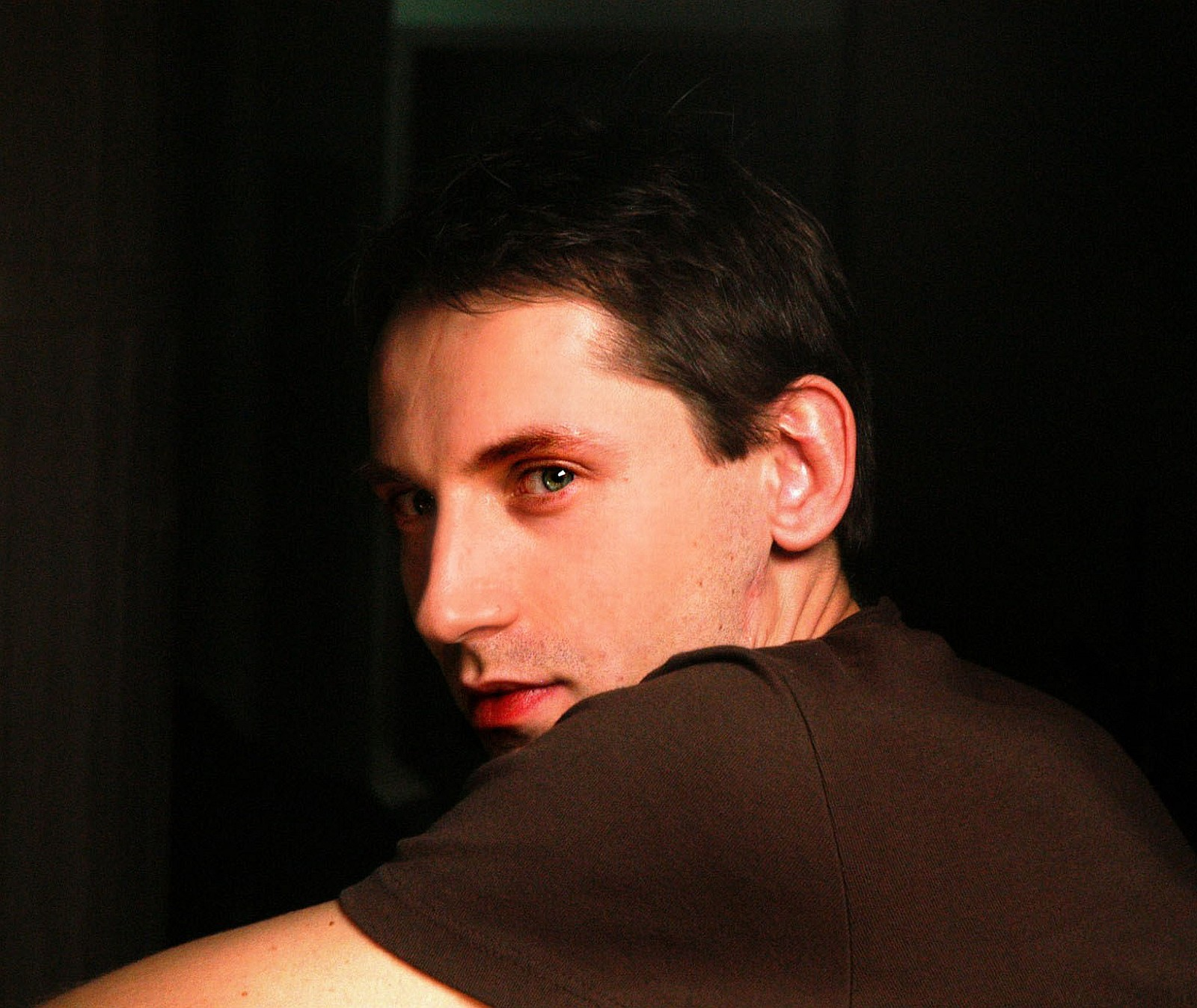

Background information
- Born: 10 April 1977 (age 49); Bielsko-Biała, Poland
- Genres: Classical
- Occupation: Pianist
- Instrument: Piano
- Website: www.lechowski.art.pl

Przemysław Lechowski (born 10 April 1977) is a Polish classical pianist.

== Biography ==
Przemysław Lechowski graduated from the Karol Szymanowski Academy of Music in Katowice, then mastered his piano skills within the post-graduate piano studies of Fryderyk Chopin Music Academy in Warsaw. He graduated from Postgraduate Studies of Foreign and International Service at the Faculty of Law and Administration of the Adam Mickiewicz University in Poznań, Poland.

In recognition of his piano skills and contribution to the popularization of Chopin's music in Siberia received title of Honorary Professor of the National Research Tomsk State University, but resigned from this title on 24 February 2022 in protest against the 2022 Russian invasion of Ukraine.

He has performed in prestigious venues in Poland, France, Russia, Germany, Norway, Italy, Lithuania, the Czech Republic, Romania, China, Indonesia and Lebanon.

Lechowski is a co-founder of the Henry Neuhaus Piano Art Foundation. He is the creator and artistic director of the International Piano Festival Chopin in the Heart of Warsaw, taking place in the Holy Trinity Lutheran Church – an official Chopin place. Between 2010 and 2022 he was a vice-chairman of the Jury of The Siberian International Chopin Piano Competition in Tomsk (Russia), while in 2012 a vice-chairman of the Jury of The Galaxy International Piano Competition in Indonesia. He has acquired the Qualified Teacher Status (QTS) for England as well.

In 2010, Lechowski was an organiser and performer of The Longest Birthday concert. This 171-hours performance of hundreds artists from Poland and abroad connected two official dates of Frédéric Chopin's 200th birthday – February 22 and March 1 and was described in medias all over the world. The Longest Birthday won two S3KTOR awards from Mayor of Warsaw: Grand Prix and award for the best NGO's cultural event in the capital city of Warsaw in 2010.

He took part in the film Meet the World about the art of piano, made by the French director and composer Fowzi Guerdjou. He is active in piano pedagogy, gave piano masterclass in Poland, Russia (terminated due to the Russian aggression towards Ukraine), Lithuania, China and Indonesia. Until 2022, he was a member of the Siberian Chopin Commeettee.

== Personal life ==
In November 2022, he was diagnosed with cancer of the nerve in his right hand. Thanks to the masterly performed surgery, after 10 months he came back to full proficiency and concert activity.

He lives in Warsaw. His brother, Lucas, is a film score composer based in Los Angeles.
