= VSTO (string quartet) =

VSTO is a string quartet by Alvin Curran. It was released on the album Schtyx (CRI: 1994), performed by a quartet led by David Abel of the Abel-Steinberg-Winant Trio.

Written for choreographer Trisha Brown, Curran writes: "As students, Elliott Carter said we could do anything but write octaves; here the octave rules like Gurdjieff. It is an interval that goes absolutely nowhere even when it goes up and down..." Richard Friedman elaborates, "Octave consonance trades with calm dissonance, and even some twisted shtetl tunes [klezmer]," and quotes Curran: "there is nothing to understand here...just let it happen." Another review wonders about the specific location: "Russian (Ukrainian? Polish?)"

The original piece, written in memory of Giacinto Scelsi (house address: Via San Teodoro Otto, Rome), is from 1988, a revision from 1994, and is now in version 2.5. Version 1 lasts eighteen minutes and was premiered by the Silesian String Quartet in Berlin in 1989; the long version (2) was premiered in 1993 by the Soldier String Quartet in New York to accompany Brown's Another Story as in Falling; and version 2.5 was premiered by the Arditti Quartet in 2009 and lasts twenty-four minutes.

The piece, for acoustic quartet, originated in a piece for electrically enhanced string quartet and computer-controlled synthesizer (For Four Or More/Four or Five) premiered by the Kronos Quartet in Darmstadt in 1986.
