= Andrzej Jasiński =

Polish pianist

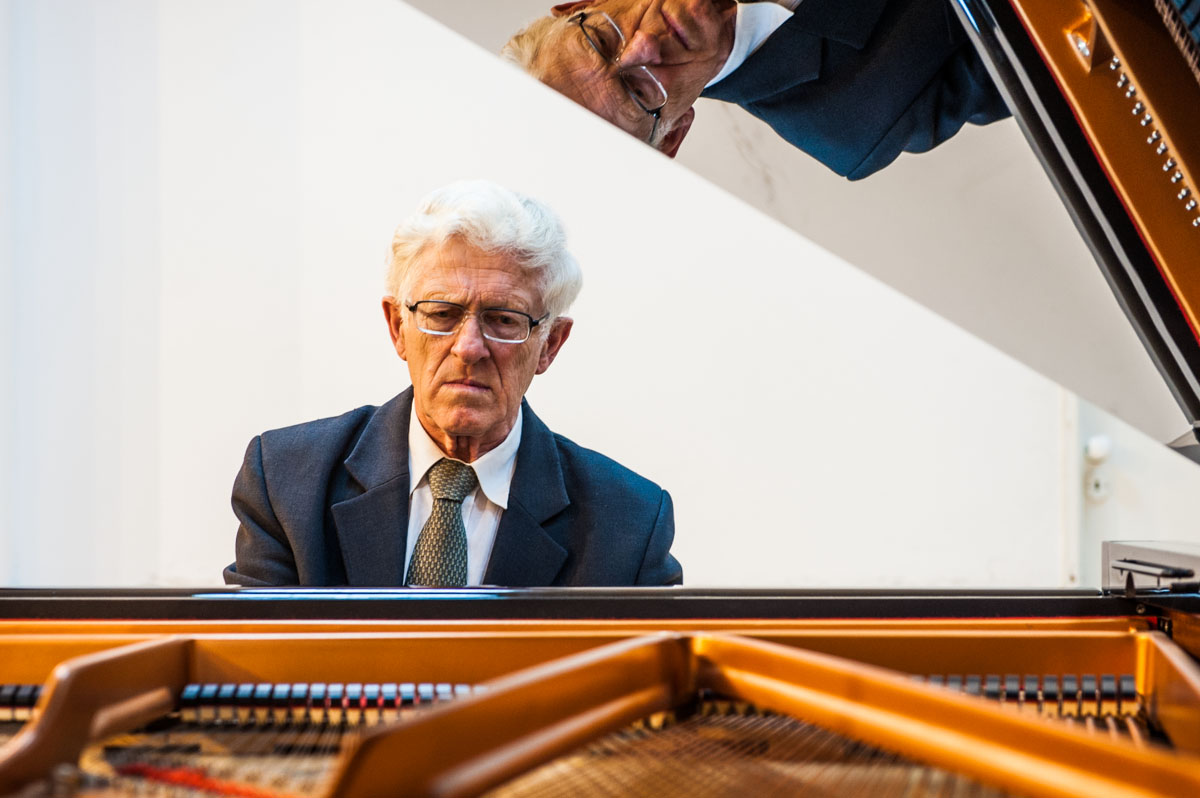

Andrzej Jasiński (born 23 October 1936 in Częstochowa) is a Polish pianist.

In 1959 he graduated with honors from the University of Music in Katowice in the piano class of Władysława Markiewiczówna. The following year he won the Maria Canals Competition, and subsequently completed his training under Magda Tagliaferro. He launched an international career (debut - 1961; RAI Orchestra in Turin, Carlo Zecchi) and began his pedagogical work for which he is best known. He taught pianists such as Krystian Zimerman, Joanna Domańska, Jerzy Sterczyński, Krzysztof Jabłoński, Magdalena Lisak, Zbigniew Raubo, Rafał Łuszczewski and Beata Bilińska.

Jasiński, a honoris causa doctor from the Fryderyk Chopin Music Academy and the University of Music in Katowice, was the jury president of the Fryderyk Chopin International Piano Competition's 2000, 2005 and 2010 editions.
