= Grażyna Krzanowska =

Polish composer

Grażyna Krzanowska (born 1 March 1952) is a Polish composer. She was born in Legnica, Poland, and studied composition with Tadeusz Natanson at the State High School of Music in Wrocław, where she graduated in 1976. After completing her studies, she took a teaching position at the Bielsko-Biala Music School. She married composer and accordionist Andrzej Krzanowski and often collaborated with him.

== Works ==
Selected compositions include:

- Melodies, 1975
- Cantata, 1975
- Passacaglia for Orchestra, 1976
- Relief X for Sax quartet, 2002, dedicated to Andrzej Krzanowski
