= Eugeniusz Knapik =

Polish pianist and composer (born 1951)

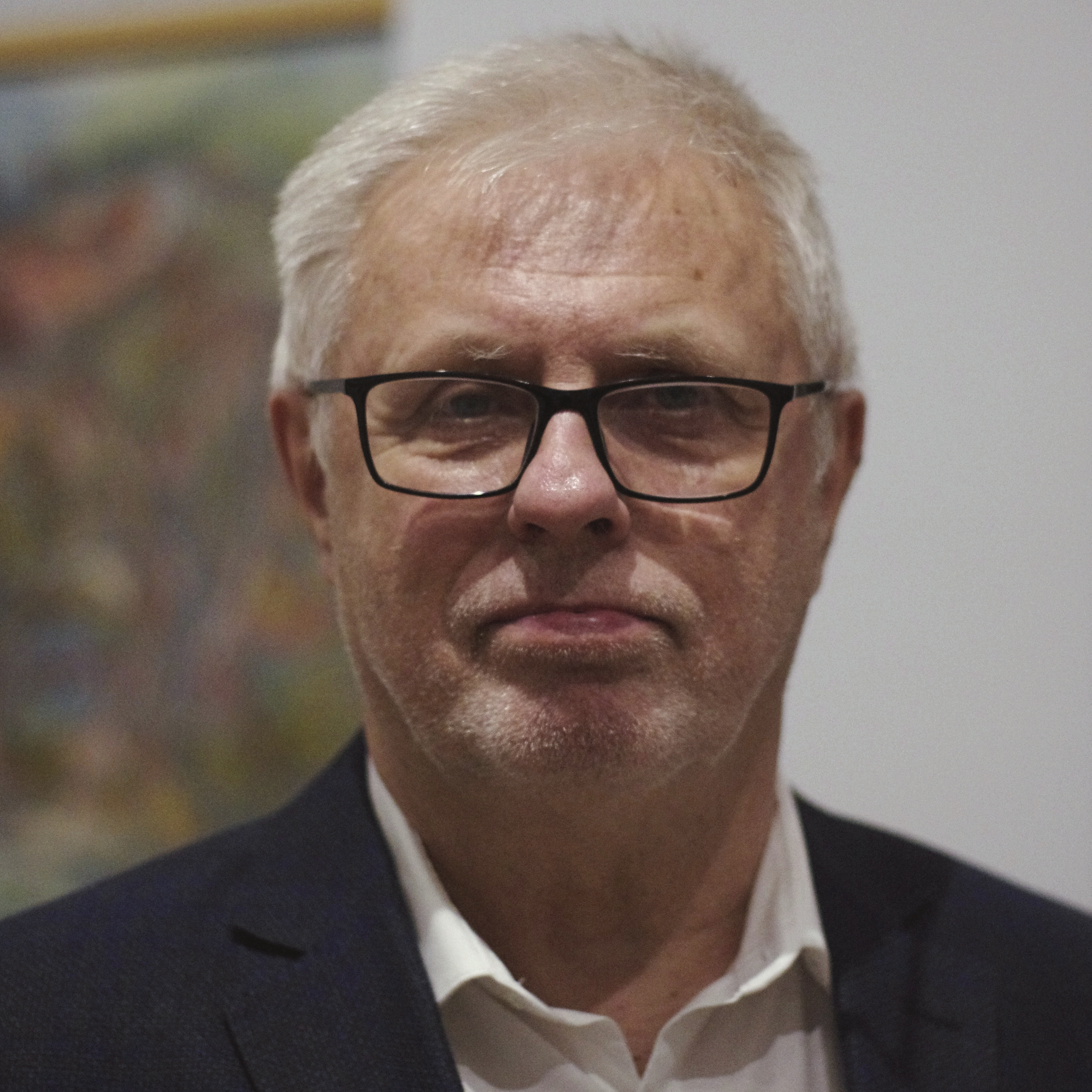
Eugeniusz Knapik (2019)

Eugeniusz Knapik (born July 9, 1951, in Ruda Śląska) is a Polish pianist and composer of classical music best known for his 1980 chamber piece String Quartet No. 1. Knapik studied composition and piano with Henryk Górecki (1933–2010) and Czesław Stańczyk at the University of Music in Katowice. As a pianist, he has recorded widely, mainly in 20th-century music. He has won numerous prizes for his compositions, including at the Festival of Polish Piano Interpretation in Słupsk, and the International Chamber Music Competition in Vienna.

Along with Andrzej Krzanowski and Aleksander Lasoń, Knapik is generally seen as a leading member of the composers who emerged in Poland during the mid-1970s. This group was collectively named Stalowa Wola after the city at which they stated their manifesto at a 1975 festival of music sub-titled "From young composers to a young City". Their statement read, "The work of the composers who entered their artistic lives at the festivals in Stalowa Wola was a kind of opposition to the 1950s and 60s avant-garde: opposition towards novelty for novelty's sake, and towards total destruction. This opposition was a spontaneous, intuitive, deep-rooted reaction, which we only later became fully aware of."

Knapik is often seem as a composer out of his time, in that his music is heavily influenced by the musical idioms of the late Romantic era, in particular by the work of Gustav Mahler (1860-1911). More recent influences include Górecki, Krzysztof Penderecki (b. 1933) and Witold Lutosławski (1913–1994). He has borrowed from 19th and 20th century English language poetry for both libretto and inspiration, a fact which sets him apart from most of his Polish contemporaries.

Today, Knapik teaches at the Katowice Academy of Music, where he is a professor and director of composition.

== Selected works ==
- Sonata for Violin and Piano, 1971
- Psalms for soloists, choir and orchestra, 1973–75
- String Quartet No. 1, 1980
- Hymn for clarinet, trombone, cello and piano, 1980
- The Minds of Helena Troubleyn, Cycle of three Operas, 1987-96
- Up into the Silence for soprano, baritone, string quartet and orchestra, 1996-2000
- Introduction to Mystery for Tenor, Mixed Choir and Symphony Orchestra, 2005
- La Liberta chiama la liberta, opera, 3rd Part of the Trilogy The Minds of Helena Troubleyn, 2010
