= Paweł Szymański =

Polish composer (born 1954)

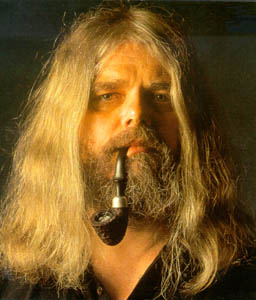
Paweł Szymański

Paweł Szymański (born 28 March 1954 in Warsaw, Poland) is a Polish composer. When he was a student at the Fryderyk Chopin University of Music, Szymański studied composition under Włodzimierz Kotoński. Paweł later studied under Roman Haubenstock-Ramanti as well as Tadeusz Baird.

His music is based on strict technical discipline and the initial sound material of Szymański’s pieces has roots in past conventions but is always processed and composed from the beginning. Szymański himself talks of his music using the qualification “surconventionalism”. Though his style is similar to that of a neoclassical composer, Szymański emphasizes past styles within his works. Many of his works also include Baroque influences as well as from Renaissance fantasias. He often modifies these classical styles of music until they become abstract and impressionistic.

Paweł has performed in many countries including Denmark, Austria, Japan, and the United States. He continues to live and work in Warsaw. His works have been performed by many groups including the Silesian String Quartet and Katowice Radio Symphony Orchestra.

His piece Qudsja Zaher captures a story about a woman from Afghanistan who is a refugee. She jumps off a boat and becomes stuck between the underworld and life.

== Awards ==
- Young Polish Composers' Competition (first prize)
- Benjamin Britten Composers Competition for Partita III

== List of selected works ==
- Epitaph (1974)
- Partita I for orchestra (1976)
- Partita II for orchestra (1978)
- Gloria (1979)
- Sonata for strings and percussion (1982)
- Appendix (1983)
- Lux aeterna (1984)
- Two Illusionary Constructions (1984)
- Dwie Etiudy (Two Etudes) for piano (1986)
- Partita III for amplified harpsichord and orchestra (1986)
- Partita IV for orchestra (1987)
- Quasi una Sinfonietta (1990)
- Miserere (1993)
- Piano concerto (1994)
- In Paradisum, motet for men's voices (1995)
- Recalling a Serenade (1996)
- Prelude and Fugue for piano (2000)
- Compartment 2, Car 7 for vibraphone, violin, viola, and cello (2003)
- Qudsja Zaher, opera in two acts (2005)
- Singletrack for piano (2005)
- Gigue for cello solo (2006)
- a piú corde for piano and harps (2010)
- ΦΥΛΑΚΤΗΡΙΟΝ (Phylakterion) (2011)
- Sostenuto for orchestra (2012)
- Dissociative Counterpoint Disorder for harpsichord (2014)
- Sonata for Viola and Piano (2015)
- Fourteen Points for orchestra (2018)

== Relevant literature ==
- Kostka, Violetta. "Intertextuality in the music of our time: Paweł Szymański's riddles." Tempo 72.286 (2018): 42-52.

== Relevant literature ==
- Kostka, Violetta. "Intertextuality in the music of our time: Paweł Szymański's riddles." Tempo 72.286 (2018): 42-52.
