= Niklas Sivelöv =

Swedish concert pianist, composer and teacher

Niklas Sivelov
- Born: 11 April 1968 (age 58); Skellefteå, Västerbotten, Sweden
- Education: Royal Academy of Music in Stockholm, Musik Hochschule Trossingen Teachers: Liisa Pohjola, Gabriel Amiras and Maria Curcio Diamond
- Occupations: Pianist, Composer and Teacher
- Years active: 1991–present

Niklas Sivelov (born 11 April 1968) is a Swedish concert pianist, composer and teacher.

== Biography ==
Niklas Sivelov was born in Skellefteå in Northern Sweden. His ancestors came from Karelia and Northern Finland.

Sivelov began studying the organ at age of 6 and later winning prizes throughout Scandinavia as an organist, mostly with his own compositions and improvisations. At the age fourteen he switched to piano and he began to practice more seriously. At seventeen, Sivelov attended the Royal College of music in Stockholm, where he studied keyboard and composition, and he made his soloist debut with the Royal Stockholm Philharmonic performing the Bartók Second Piano Concerto in 1991. He continued his studies in Helsinki, Bucharest, Trossingen and London. His repertoire extends from Bach to Contemporary, including a number of Swedish composers. His performance collaborations with conductors include, among others, Esa-Pekka Salonen, Leif Segerstam, Thomas Dausgaard, Jukka Pekka Saraste, Kees Bakels, Alan Gilbert, Paavo Berglund, Mario Venzago, John Axelrod and Kazufumi Yamashita. He has performed with the leading orchestras in Scandinavia, Tonhalle Zurich, Suisse Romande and orchestras all over Europe.

Niklas Sivelöv is a dedicated chamber musician. He gives recitals in venues all over the world and has worked together with many artists such as: Mark Peskanov, Leonid Gorokhov, Martin Fröst, Patrick Gallois and Malena Ernman. He has also performed and recorded with the accordionist Lelo Nika.

Niklas Sivelöv performed Bach's Das Wohltemperierte Klavier book 1 and 2 in three concerts at Bargemusic, New York in January 2010.

The distinctions Niklas Sivelöv has received are many and impressive signifying his position as leading Scandinavian pianist. His recording of his own improvisations over Bellman's music was awarded the important The Independent Music Awards, where he was the first Scandinavian ever won the prize for the best classical album and was elected Winner of Vox Populi poll, a component of the 8th IMA program. Former winners include names like Norah Jones, Tom Waits and Peter Gabriel. Niklas Sivelöv was recently elected for the Steinway Hall of Fame.

He has received the Diapason d'Or (Berwald's Piano Concerto), Cannes nomination for best 20th century recording (Einar Englund's Piano Concerto No.1) and Penguin Record Guide's highest marks (Piano works by Wilhelm Stenhammar and Wilhelm Peterson-Berger). Sivelöv has recently released the recording of Robert Schumann's Piano Sonatas and Stenhammar's two Piano Concertos with Malmö Symphony Orchestra.

Niklas Sivelöv is professor at the Royal Academy of Music in Copenhagen.

== Discography ==
- J.S Bach, 3 Sonatas for cello and piano with Morten Zeuthen
- J.S. Bach Das Wohltemperierte Klavier
- Niklas Sivelov Works for piano 24 Preludes a.o.
- Exposé Improvisations for 1&2 pianos
- Schumann Piano Sonatas
- Vers la flamme, music of A.N Skrjabin
- Improvisational 1, piano improvisations inspired by C M Bellman
- Piano Music of Argentina, Music by Ginastera, Piazzolla and Guastavino
- Wilhelm Stenhammar: Piano Works
- Danzas, Music for tuba and piano with Oystein Baadsvik
- Franz Berwald: Piano Concerto in D major
- Swedish Piano Music, Music by Morales, Seymer, Milveden, Rangström a.o.
- Wlodek Gulgowski, works for piano
- W. Peterson-Berger, Flowers from Frösö Island (Melodies, Humoresques and Idylls for Piano)
- Wilhelm Stenhammar: The 2 concertos for piano
- Einar Englund – Orchestral Works: Blackbird Symphony; Nostalgic Symphony; Piano Concerto
- R. Schumann – Piano Works: Kreisleriana, Sonata G Minor, Arabesk and Variations, Op. 14
- Liszt: Pianotranscriptions of Symphonies Nos. 1 and 3 (Eroica) by Beethoven
- Lars Ekström: The Dream Age-Concerto, dedicated to Niklas Sivelöv
- Fratres with Szymon Krzeszowiec, violin; music by Pärt, Reger, Stravinsky, Dallapiccola and Schnittke

== Compositions ==
Opus	Work	Date
1	Divertimento per archi (stringtrio)	1986
2	The Rage of the Chameleon	1987
3	Dance of the Bull	1989
4	String quartet nr 1	1989
5	Passacaglia per archi	1989
6	Sonata for tuba and piano	1992
7	Suite para marimba	1995
8	Sonata quasi una rhapsodia per violino e pianoforte	1996
9	Sonatina for flute and piano	1997
10	Twist and Shout for clarinet solo	1997
11	Concerto Classico for piano and orchestra	1998
12	Suite for percussion and piano	1999
13	Concerto nr. 2 for piano and strings	2001
14	The Spiders Nest for cello and piano	2003
15	Toccata for piano	2004
16	Introduction and Allegro for oboe and piano	2004
17	Tres Danzas for tuba and piano	2005
18	The NY trio for violin, cello and piano	2005
19	Touchè! for percussion ensemble 4 players	2007
20	Suite for marimba and vibraphone	2010
21	Suite in modo classico	1995–2010
22	24 Preludes for piano	2010-2014
23	2 Improvisations	2010
24	Album for the youth book 1	2010
25	Symphony no. 1 "Nordico"	2015
26	Symphony no. 2 "The myth of sisyphus"	2017
27	Concerto no. 3 for piano and orchestra	2017
28	5 pieces for string orchestra	2017
