= Joanna Domańska =

Polish classical pianist

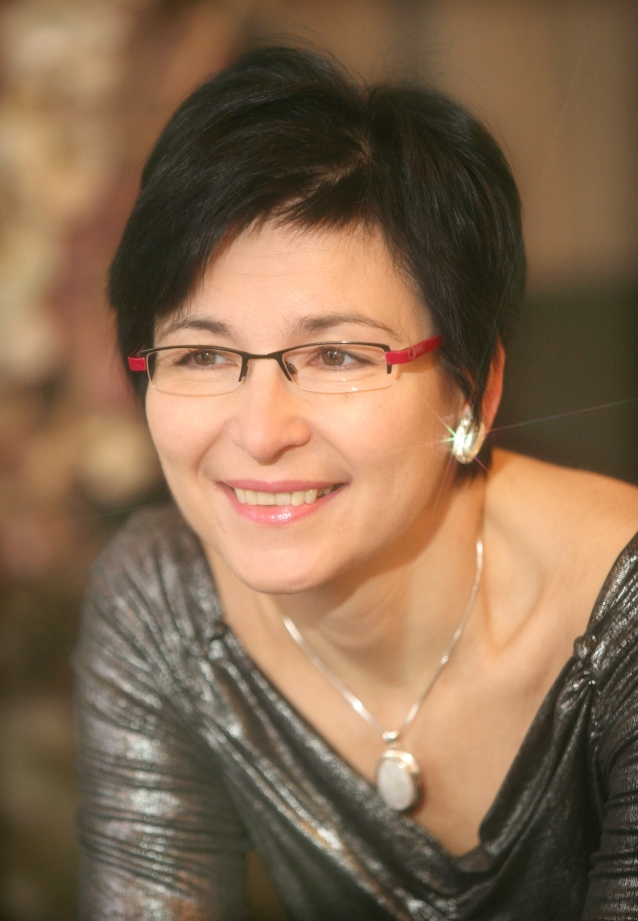

Background information
- Genres: Classical
- Occupations: Pianist

Joanna Domańska (born 20 September 1959) is a Polish classical pianist and music teacher from Gliwice.

== Biography ==
Domańska started her piano studies at the Academy of Music in Kraków with professor Jan Hoffman, and graduated with distinction from the Academy of Music in Katowice in 1982. She continued her piano studies with Livia Rév in Paris 1986–1987 on a grant from the government of France. She is an interpreter of Karol Szymanowski's works, and has also interpreted Brahms, Ravel, Mozart and Chopin.

Domańska is a laureate of international piano competitions: M. Long – J. Thibaud in Paris 1981 and A. Casagrande in Terni, Italy 1982, as well as of the Young Stage at the Polish Piano Festival in Slupsk 1982. She has been invited to participate in music festivals including the Festival dei Due Mondi in Spoleto, Festa Musica Pro in Assisi, Maggio Musicale Fiorentino in Florence, Festival de Radio France et de Montpellier, Warsaw Autumn, the Cracow Composer Days, Karol Szymanowski Music Days in Zakopane, the Polish Piano Festival in Slupsk and the Chopin Festival in Duszniki.

Domańska recorded three CDs with Karol Szymanowski works. The first one was recorded in 1995 by British record company Olympia (OCD 344). The album was twice nominated for the "Fryderyk" award given by the phonographic industry in Poland.

In 2007 the Polish record company DUX published Domańska's second album (DUX 0576), recorded with Andrzej Tatarski: the first performance of a piano version of Szymanowski's music to ballet "Harnasie", adapted for two pianos. In the same year she recorded her third CD published at DUX with piano works of Karol Szymanowski (Metophes op. 29, 12 Studies op. 33, IIIrd Sonata op. 36, 4 Polish Dances). This CD was honoured by "Pizzicato" with "Supersonic Award"(DUX 0615).

Domańska has recorded for Polish Radio and Television, Radiotelevisione Italiana and Radio France.

Domańska conducts piano classes at the Academy of Music in Katowice, she was invited several times as a member of jury at Polish and international piano competitions and lectures at master courses.

Since 2011 Domańska has been deputy president of the Karol Szymanowski Music Association.
