= Dux Records =

Polish classical record label

Dux is a Polish classical recording label. It was founded in 1992 by sound engineers Małgorzata Polańska and Lech Tołwiński.

The label specialises in Polish artists and Polish composers. Many DUX recordings are premiere recordings, such as Karol Kurpiński's opera Zamek na Czorsztynie and piano works by Jadwiga Sarnecka. The label is the associate record label of Wratislavia Cantans festival and of the Warsaw Chamber Opera.
