= Dominik Połoński =

Polish concert cellist (1977–2018)

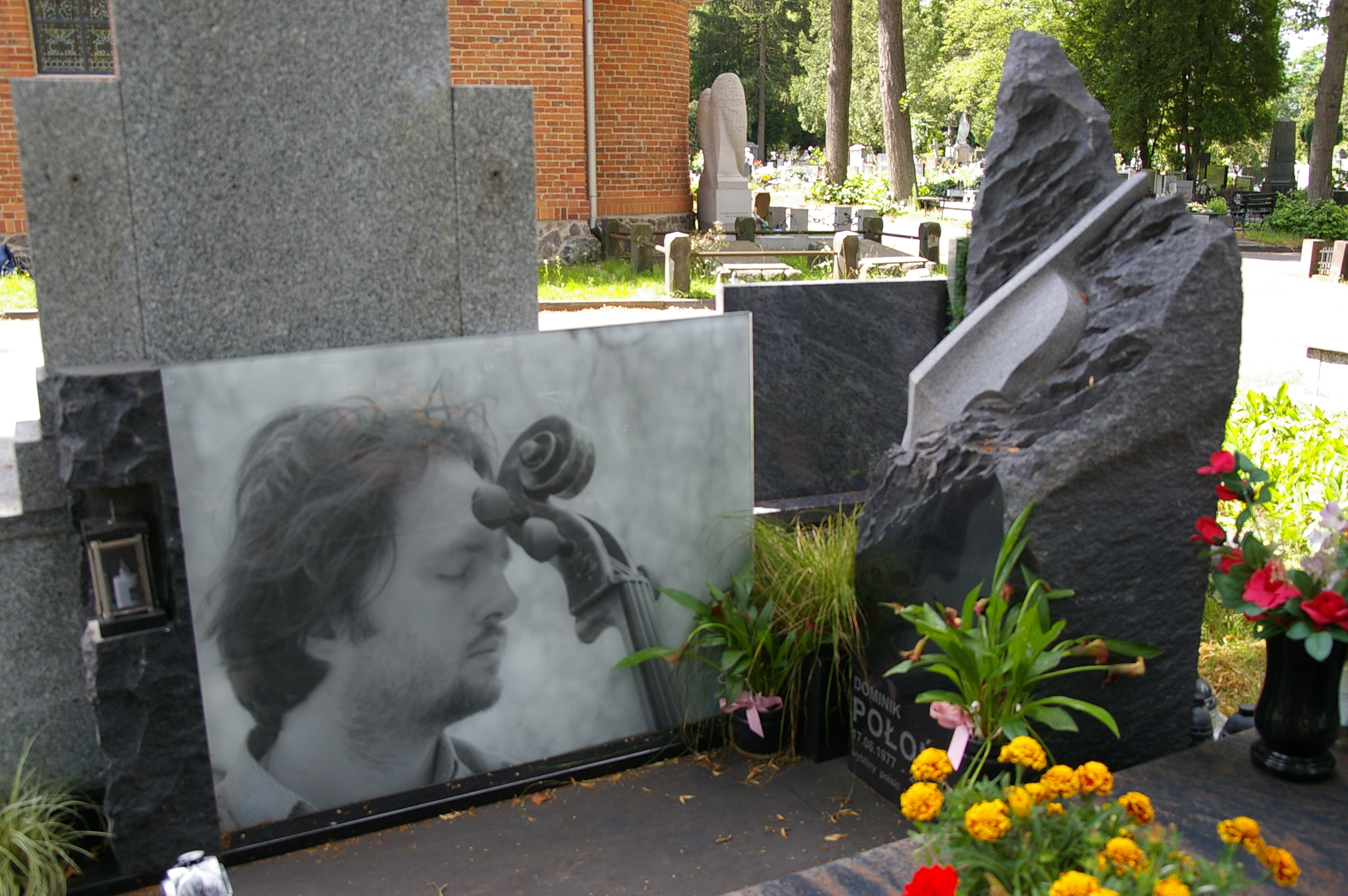
A painting of Dominik Połoński

Dominik Połoński (17 June 1977 – 20 June 2018) was a Polish concert cellist. He continued his career using his right arm, after treatment for a brain tumour.

== Life ==
Połoński was born in Kraków, and studied at the Academy of Music in Łódź. Winning a scholarship, he studied in Spain at the Reina Sofía School of Music with Natalia Shakhovskaya, also studying with visiting professor Mstislav Rostropovich.

He was successful in several competitions, including first place in the competition of the Yamaha Music Foundation in 1998. He made recordings for a number of recording companies, and performed in many European countries and in the United States.

In 2004 he was diagnosed with a brain tumour. He had several operations, and chemo- and radiotherapy, and was afterwards unable to move the left side of his body. He returned to the concert platform in 2009, playing the cello using his right arm, performing works specially written for him by Polish composers. These included compositions using percussive components and unusual string tuning.

During his later years he also taught at the Academy of Music in Łódź and the Academy of Music in Kraków.

Połoński died on 20 June 2018, after the disease returned.
