= Simon Laks =

Polish composer and musician (1901–1983)

Simon (Szymon) Laks (1 November 1901 – 11 December 1983) was a Polish Jewish composer and violinist, who became head of the prisoners' orchestra at Birkenau-Auschwitz.

== Biography ==
Simon Laks was born in Warsaw on 1 November 1901. He was born a Russian citizen. He studied mathematics in Vilnius and Warsaw. In 1921, he entered the Conservatoire of Warsaw, the capital of the newly independent Poland. He became a Polish citizen. In 1924, the Warsaw Philharmonic played one of his works in public for the first time. It was the symphonic poem Farys (now lost). Laks left Poland for Vienna in 1926. He worked providing piano accompaniment for silent films.

He then turned to Paris where he continued his musical studies until 1929 at the Conservatoire National. At that time, he spoke Polish, Russian, French, German, and English. He became one of the founder members of the Association for Young Polish Musicians in Paris, founded at the end of 1926 with his help. Many of Laks' works were written for Parisian concerts at this time: his quintet for wind instruments (lost), his second string quartet (lost) and his sonata for cello and piano. In Paris, Simon Laks met Tadeusz Makowski. In the 1930s, he formed a fruitful artistic collaboration with the singer Tola Korian. He wrote songs for her in Polish and French, as well as many songs she had written herself. Simon Laks composed neo-classical music.

In 1941, Simon Laks, a Jew, was arrested by the German authorities and interned in the camp at Pithiviers, close to Orléans. He was deported to Auschwitz in July 1942. As a musician, he was treated better than most deportees, and survived for more than two years where he was the head of the orchestra at the concentration camp. After the war, he recounted his experience in the book Mélodies d'Auschwitz. He also reflected on the role music had in the extermination. When he arrived in the camp, he noted: "...music stand, music stands! (...) Where there are music stands, there must be musicians. You can't have one without the other. Who plays music here? The executioner, or his victims? What type of music do they play? Danses macabres? Funeral songs? Hitlerian chants?"

He said that at Auschwitz, the orchestra played twice a day, at the start, and at the end. They accompanied the Kommandos when they entered and exited the camp gates. He stated that far from being a medium of resistance, music was a supplementary torture instrument, an instrument of total domination. Music aggravated the detainees, physically and morally. It incited the detainees to work, without reflection.

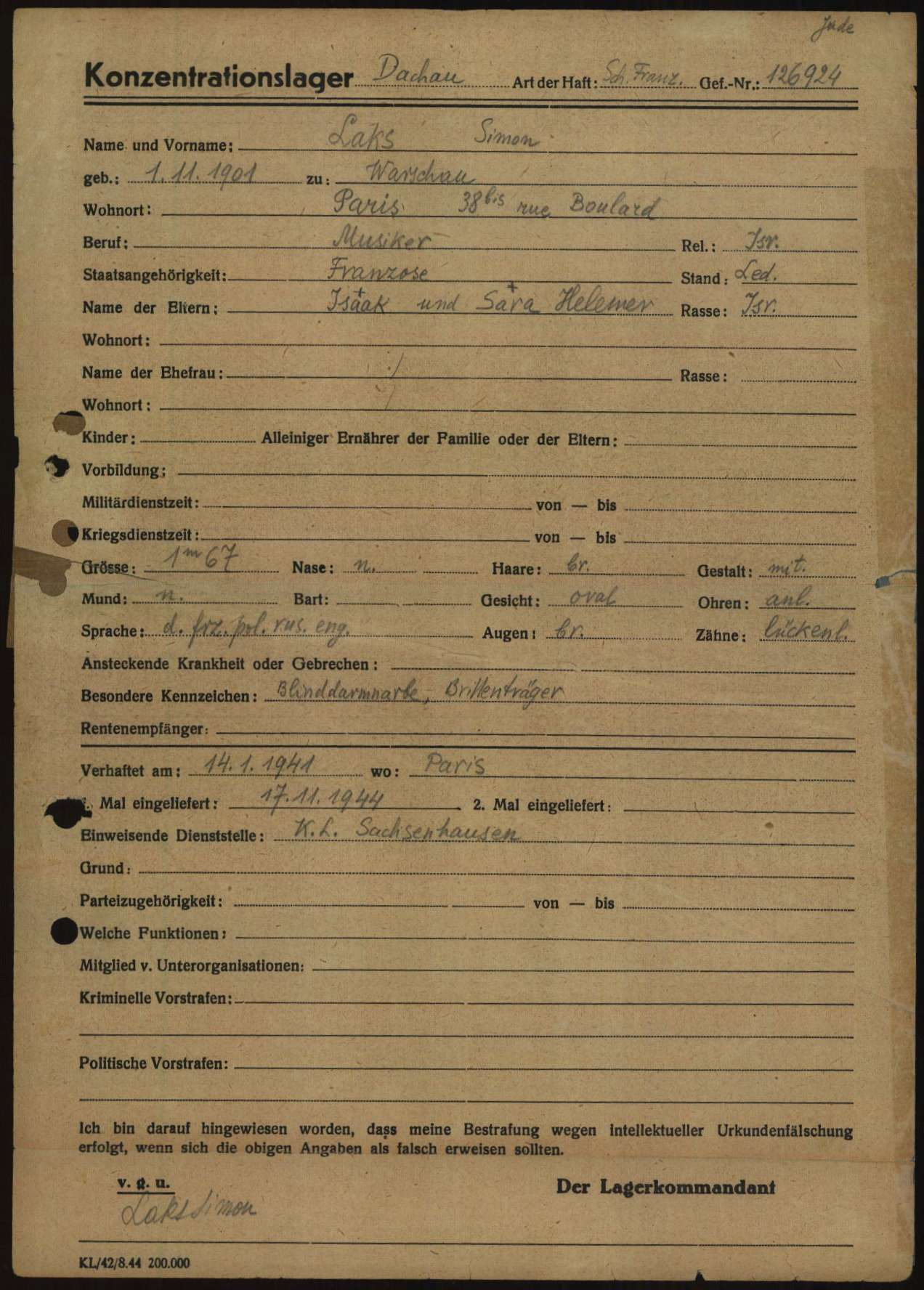
Registration form of Simon Laks as a prisoner at Dachau Nazi Concentration Camp

On 28 October 1944, he was transferred to the Dachau concentration camp. On 29 April 1945, the camp was liberated by the American army. On 18 May, he was returned to Paris and became a French citizen.

Simon Laks worked in the baroque and classical genres, the traditional principles and formal construction of instruments combining for tonal harmony. He possessed a sense of proportions, a mastery of polyphonic technique, a rhythmic purity, and a simple and pure style. The many songs of Simon Laks cover many influences: the vocal lyrical romantic tradition of Polish lieds and the French interwar style.

From 1972, Simon Laks dedicated his writing to translation. He had a passion for linguistic problems, but also for social and political problems. He is the author of a number of books. He died, aged 82, in Paris.

== Works ==
=== Literary works ===
- 1948: Musiques d’un autre monde, with René Coudy. Mercure de France, 1948; republished under the name Mélodies d'Auschwitz, Le Cerf, 1991. Pierre Vidal Naquet, author of the new preface wrote: "This text, first published in 1948, as Mélodies d’Auschwitz, edited in 1978, is more decanted, and purified." Translated into English by Chester A. Kisiel as Music of Another World and published by Northwestern University Press in 1989. ISBN 0-8101-0841-0
- 1976: Episodes, épigrammes, épîtres
- 1977: Polonismes, polémiques, politiques
- 1978: Mot et contre-mot
- 1979: Jeux Auschwitziens
- 1980: Souillure de sainteté
- 1981: Journal des journées blanches
- 1982: Le tarif réduit coûte plus cher
- 1983: Ma guerre pour la paix
- 1984: La culture avec guillemets et sans

=== Musical works ===
- 1924:
  - Symphony
  - Farys - a Symphonic Poem
- 1925: Scherzo
- 1928:
  - Symphonic Blues
  - Sonatina
  - String Quartet no. 1
- 1929:
  - Sonata Concertante for Violin and Piano
  - Wind Quintet
  - Petit Suite for String Quartet
- 1932:
  - String Quartet no. 2
  - Sonata for Cello and Piano
- 1933:
  - Three Concertos for Cello and Piano
  - Sabra (film score)
- 1934: The Awakening (film score)
- 1935: Polish Suite for Violin and Piano
- 1936: Sinfonietta for String Orchestra
- 1938: Three Poems by J.Tuwim
- 1946: String Quartet no. 3
- 1947:
  - Three Varsovian Polonaises
  - Sonata Breve for Harpsichord
  - Eight Jewish folk songs
- 1949: Ballad for Piano
- 1950: Piano Trio
- 1954: Poem for Violin and Orchestra
- 1950: Three Poems by W.M.Berezowska
- 1961: Elegy for Jewish villages
- 1962: String Quartet no. 4
- 1963: Concerto da Camera for Piano, 9 Wind Instruments and Percussion
- 1964:
  - Symphony for String Orchestra
  - String Quartet no. 5
  - Dialogue for Two Cellos
  - Portrait of a non-existent bird for Voice and Piano
- 1965:
  - Concertino for Reed Trio
  - L’hirondelle inattendue – opera buffa
- 1966: Divertimento for Flute, Violin, Cello and Piano
- 1967: Piano Quintet on Polish Folk Themes
- 1968: Five Poems by J.Tuwim
- 1969: Suite Concertante for Trombone and Piano
- 1973:
  - Chorale for 3 Trombones
  - Suite in olden style for Piano or Harpsichord
