= Jakob Kullberg =

Danish cellist (born 1976)

Jakob Kullberg (born 16 January 1976 in Aarhus, Denmark) is a classical cellist, noted for his collaboration with the Danish composer Per Nørgård.

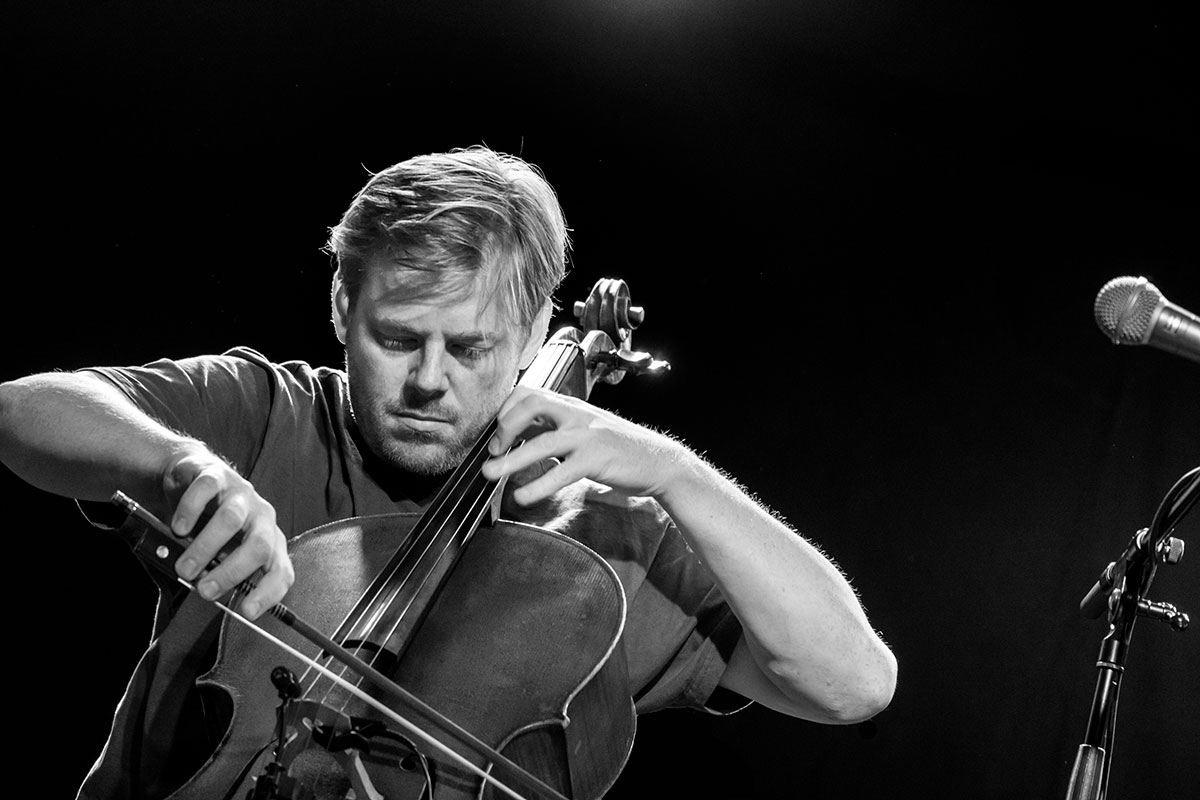
Jakob Kullberg Denmark 2021

== Studies ==
He began his studies with Prof. Harro Ruijsenaars at the Royal Academy of Music, Jutland where he studied from 1995 until 1998.

In 1998 he left Denmark and moved to Amsterdam, Holland, in order to study with Russian cellist Prof. Dmitri Ferschtman at the Conservatorium van Amsterdam until 2001. After taking his diploma at Conservatorium van Amsterdam he moved to Zagreb, Croatia, to study with Prof. Valter Despalj at the Zagreb Academy of Music from 2001 until 2002.

After one year in Croatia he moved to London to take a master's degree at the Royal Academy of Music where he studied with Prof. Mats Lidström and Prof. Colin Carr from 2002 until 2004. After London, Kullberg began studying privately in Vienna with Prof. Reinhard Latzko in 2004/2005 before returning to Denmark to take his Soloist Diploma at the Royal Danish Academy of Music, Copenhagen, with Prof. Morten Zeuthen.

== Career ==
In recent years Kullberg has been specializing in the solo cello suites by J. S. Bach under the guidance of Dutch baroque cellist Anner Bylsma.

Kullberg is known for his working relationship with Danish composer Per Nørgård. Nørgård has composed numerous works for him including chamber groups such as his 10th string quartet "Harvest Timeless" and works for solo cello such as his fourth solo sonata "Rhizome", which Kullberg premiered at the Aldeburgh Festival in June 2007 to the following critical acclaim:

The early concert on Saturday from the young Danish cellist Jakob Kullberg was the perfect Aldeburgh event. He has an amazing control of line, and is always bang in tune even in the most finger-twisting passages, skills he used to spellbinding effect in the Sonata No. 2 by his compatriot Per Nørgård.

The most recent product of their continued collaboration is Nørgård's second cello concerto, "Momentum".

The English composer Simon Holt wrote his 2009 duo for violin and cello "Telarañas" (Spanish for cobwebs) for Kullberg and dedicated it to him.

== Recordings ==
Momentum with the New Music Orchestra, Bratislava and Szymon Bywalec, containing Per Nørgård's cello concerto and other pieces, was released in 2012.
