= Karol Szymanowski Academy of Music =

Music school in Katowice, Poland

Coordinates: 50°15′19″N 19°01′48″E

The Karol Szymanowski Academy of Music in Katowice
- Akademia Muzyczna im. Karola Szymanowskiego w Katowicach
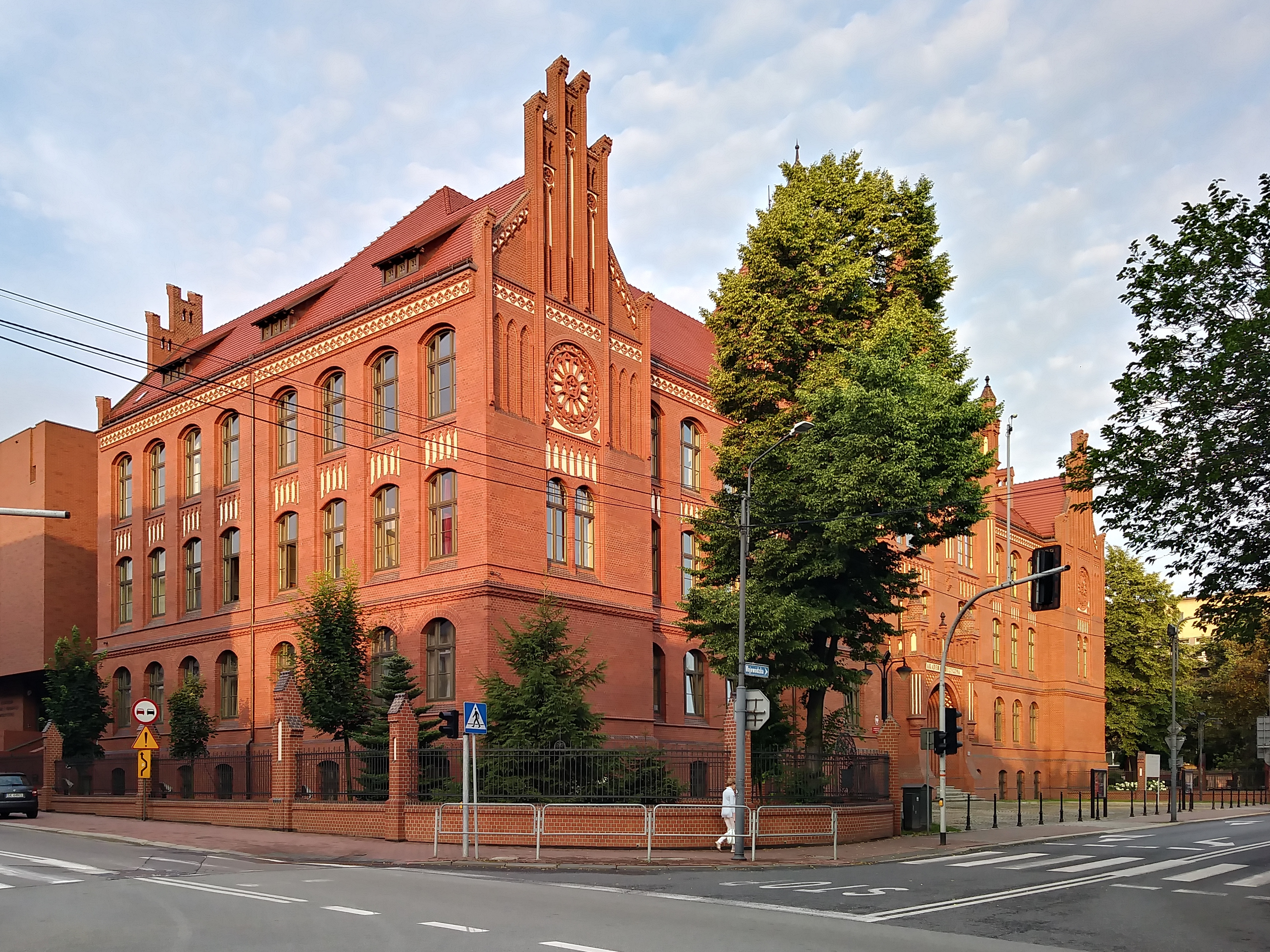
- Established: 1929
- Rector: Władysław Szymański
- Address: ul. Zacisze 3, 40-025 Katowice, Katowice, Poland
- Website: am.katowice.pl

The Karol Szymanowski Academy of Music is a school of music of university level in Katowice, in Poland. It is named for Karol Szymanowski.

== Studies ==
The school offers full-time and part-time BA, MA and DA studies at four departments: Composition, Conducting, Theory and Music Education, Jazz and Popular Music, Instrumental and Vocal-Acting. Studies are offered in the following fields:

- conducting (speciality: symphonic and operatic conducting, choral conducting)
- composition and theory of music (specialties: composition, theory of music)
- music education (specialties: music education, eurhythmics, music therapy)
- jazz interpretation (specialties: composition and arrangements, instrumental performance, vocal performance, sound production)
- instrumental performance
- vocal performance
- dance performance

It offers paid studies in given specialties in the English language. Study programs are based on the European Credit Transfer System.

== Concerts ==
Each year the school holds several artistic events such as concerts (admission free), competitions, master classes and conferences. Many ensembles consisting of students perform concerts on a regular basis: Karol Szymanowski Academic Symphony Orchestra, Academic Wind Orchestra, Academic Baroque Orchestra, Academic Chamber Orchestra, Mixed Choir of the Karol Szymanowski Academy of Music, Chamber Choir and Jazz Institute Big-Band. It organizes bigger events as well: International Festival of Academic Orchestras (every 2 years), Instrumental Music Festival (each year), Vocal Music Days (each year), International Violin Festival, Silesian Jazz Festival (each year), All-Poland Brass Instruments Competition, International Harp Festival.

== Alumni ==
Alumni include:

- Composers: Wojciech Kilar, Henryk Mikołaj Górecki, Witold Szalonek, Eugeniusz Knapik, Aleksander Lasoń
- Conductors: Karol Stryja
- Piano: Tadeusz Żmudziński, Lidia Grychtołówna, Andrzej Jasiński, Jerzy Sterczyński, Krystian Zimerman, Joanna Domańska, Krzysztof Jabłoński, Przemysław Lechowski, Szczepan Kończal, Anna Górecka, Jarred Dunn
- Violin: Szymon Krzeszowiec, Martyna Pastuszka
- Guitar: Marcin Dylla
- Jazz and pop performers: Tomasz Szukalski, Kuba Badach, Mietek Szcześniak, Kasia Cerekwicka, Janusz Szrom
- the Silesian String Quartet, including: Szymon Krzeszowiec

== Location ==
The school consists of five buildings. The oldest neo-Gothic building was constructed at the end of the 19th century (33, Wojewódzka street). It is linked with the modern building which includes a concert hall for 480 people by a spacious atrium (designed by Tomasz Konior). Apart from the concert hall, the modern building includes one of the biggest musical libraries in Poland, a music therapy hall, an electronic music laboratory, a restaurant and many other facilities. The atrium is also linked with a building in 3, Zacisze street, where the academy's authorities have their offices. The other two buildings where lectures and rehearsals take place, are located in 5, Zacisze street and 27, Krasińskiego street.

== Museum of Silesian Organ ==
The Museum of Silesian Organ, located in the basement of the oldest building, is the only museum of this kind in Central Europe. It gathers and preserves many objects connected with organ and its history.

== International cooperation ==
The academy has exchange agreements with the School of Music of University of Louisville in the United States, the Zoltán Kodály Pedagogical Institute of Music in Kecskemét in Hungary, and the department of musicology of Palacký University of Olomouc in the Czech Republic. It participates in the Socrates–Erasmus Programme.
