= Aleksander Lasoń =

Polish composer and teacher (born 1951)

Aleksander Lasoń (born 10 November 1951) is a Polish composer and teacher. He was born in Siemianowice Śląskie.

He studied composition under professor Józef Świder's at The Karol Szymanowski Academy of Music in Katowice. He is professor at the University of Silesia and at the Academy of Music in Katowice.

He has received numerous awards and commissions, including The Beethoven Prize of the City of Bonn in 1980 for his Symphony No. 2, Concertante for piano and orchestra; he received three coveted awards at the UNESCO's International Tribune of Composers in Paris: in 1980, he was awarded first place for his Symphony No. 1 for brass instruments, percussion and two pianos, in 1988—his String Quartet No. 2 and in 1997—his Concerto Festivo for violin and orchestra, were distinguished.

== Selected works ==
- Sonata for violin and piano (1970–71)
- Songs for soprano and piano (1973)
- Muzyka kameralna nr 1 (Chamber Music No. 1) for Piano, 2 Violins, Viola and Violoncello "Stalowawolska" (1974-1978)
- Symphony No. 1 for brass instruments, percussion and two pianos (1975)
- Sonata for solo violin no. 1 (1975)
- Music in Shakespeare for baritone and magnetic tape (1975)
- Music in Four Parts for double-bass and piano (1977)
- Symphony No. 2 “Concertante” for piano and orchestra (1977–79)
- Mountains for symphony orchestra (1979–80)
- Sonata for solo violin no. 2 (1983–84)
- String Quartet No. 2 (1987)
- String Quartet No. 3 (1992–93)
- Concerto festivo for violin and orchestra (1993–95)
- Symphony No. 3 “1999” Apokalypsis for choir and orchestra (1996–97)
- Musica Sacra – Sanctus for four male voices, organ and string orchestra (1998)
- A Little Book for clarinet and strings (2001)
- Sinfonia concertante for guitar and chamber orchestra (2004)
- "Called Back" for four singing voices and string orchestra (2008)
- SATJA – Symphony No. 4 for orchestra (2006–07)
