= Witold Szalonek =

Polish composer

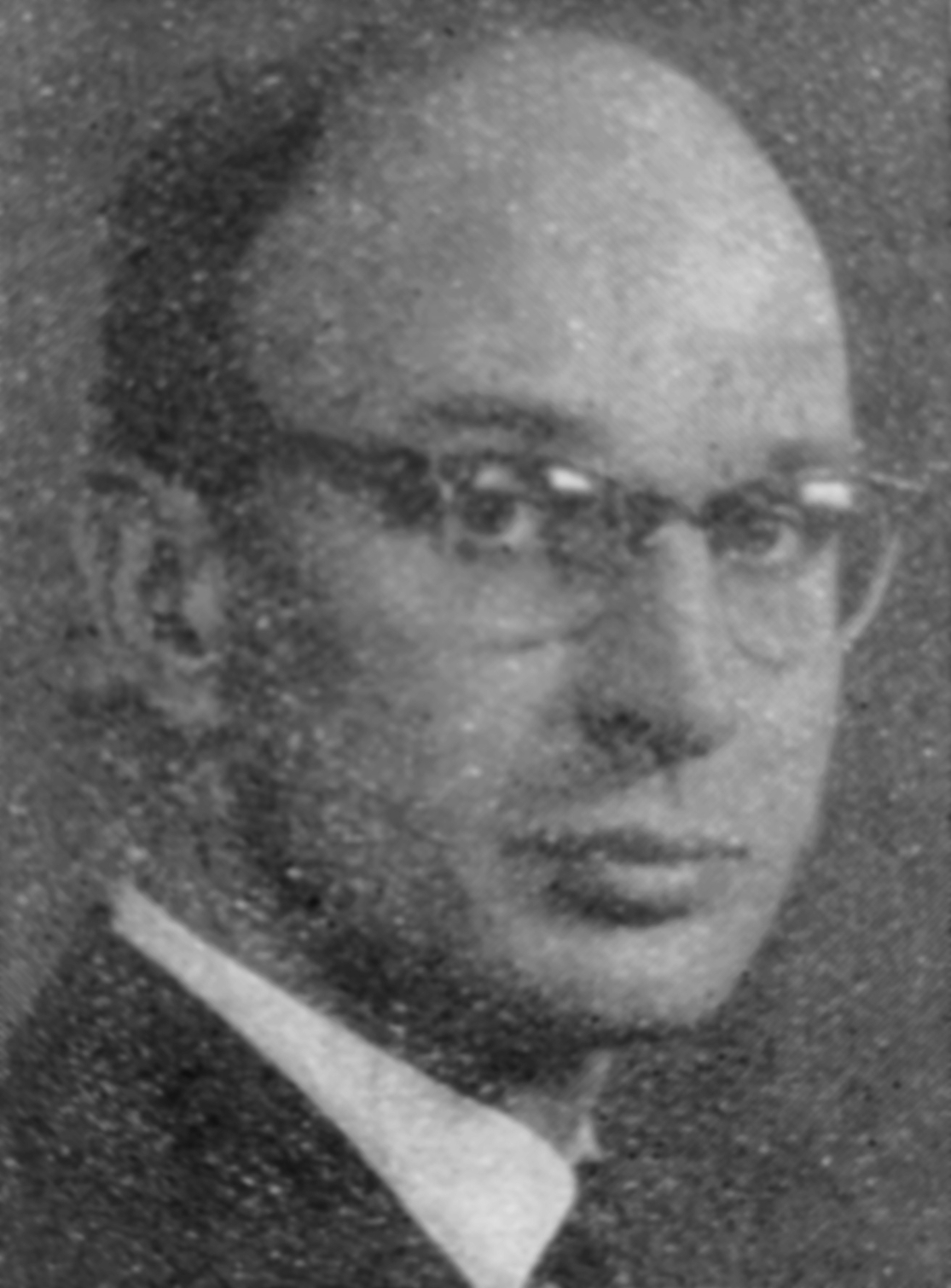
- Born: March 2, 1927; Czechowice-Dziedzice, Poland
- Died: October 12, 2001 (aged 74); Berlin, Germany
- Era: Contemporary; 20th Century Classical

Witold Szalonek (born in 1927 in Czechowice-Dziedzice, died in 2001 in Berlin) was a Polish composer.

In 1949-56 he studied at the State Higher School of Music in Katowice. Following his first successes at international composers' competitions, he received a grant from Kranichsteiner Musikinstitut in Darmstadt (1960). In 1962-63 he continued his studies with Nadia Boulanger in Paris. In 1967 he began to teach composition at the Katowice School and in 1970-74 was in charge of the Department of Composition and Theory. In the early 1970s he was invited by the Deutscher Akademischer Austauschdienst to work as artist in residence at West Berlin's Hochschule der Künste. In 1973 he won the competition to succeed Boris Blacher as Professor of Composition there. He has conducted numerous seminars and courses in composition in Poland, Denmark, Germany, Finland and Slovakia. In 1990 he received an honorary doctor's degree from the Wilhelmian University in Münster.

In 1963 Szalonek discovered and classified the so-called 'combined sounds' generated by the woodwind instruments. He is also the author of theoretical studies on a wide range of subjects, including combined sounds, sonorism, Chopin and Debussy.

== Selected works ==
- Suite from Kurpie for Alto Solo and 9 Instruments, 1955
- Satire for Orchestra, 1956
- 1+1+1+1 per 1-4 strumenti ad arco, 1969
- O, Pleasant Earth, Cantata for Voice and Orchestra, 1969
- Musica concertante for Double-bass and Orchestra, 1977
- Little Symphony B-A-C-H for Piano and Orchestra, 1981
- Bagattellae di Dahlem, II for Flute and Piano, 1998
