= Andrzej Krzanowski =

Polish composer (1951–1990)

Andrzej Krzanowski (9 April 1951, in Czechowice-Dziedzice – 1 October 1990, in Czechowice-Dziedzice) was a Polish composer of classical music, accordionist, and teacher.

Between 1971–75 Krzanowski studied with Henryk Górecki at the University of Music in Katowice.

He was an author of small and big chamber music forms scored for unconventional instruments, often in combination with a human voice or tape music, most often with the participation of the accordion. He was inspired by contemporary literature and he liked to use a quotation (Johann Sebastian Bach, Karol Szymanowski, Henryk Mikołaj Górecki). He was capable of creating an unusual climate with a considerable amount of expression ranging from spontaneous (Concerto for Orchestra) to lyrical and contemplative (Second Symphony, Third String Quartet).

== Selected works ==
- Audycja II WG Poezji (After Jacek Bieriezin); for reciter, flute, tam-tam, siren, whistle and 2 tapes, 1973
- De Profundis (cantata) for baritone and orchestra, 1974
- Symphony No. 1 for Orchestra, 1975
- Studium V (from Second Book) for Accordion Quintet, 1976
- Canti di Wratislavia for Symphony Orchestra, 1976
- Studium I for Accordion and Orchestra, 1979
- Salve Regina for Boys Choir or Female Choir, 1981
- 6th Programme for Soprano and String Quartet, 1982
- Symphony No. 2 for 13 String Instruments, 1984
- Relief IX (Szkocki) / RelieftIX; for string quartet and tape (1988)
