= Johann-Werner Prein =

Austrian operatic bass-baritone

- Born: 3 January 1954 (age 71); Trofaiach, Styria, Austria
- Occupation: Operatic bass-baritone
- Organizations: Musiktheater im Revier; Staatstheater Wiesbaden

Johann-Werner Prein (German pronunciation: [ˈjoːhanˌvɛʁnɐ ˈpʁaɪn]; born 3 January 1954) is an Austrian operatic bass-baritone who made an international career, performing at major houses and festivals based in Germany. He performed leading roles of both the baritone repertoire such as Wagner's Sachs in Die Meistersinger von Nürnberg and bass roles such as Mozart's Sarastro in Die Zauberflöte. In recordings, he has focused on operas of the early 20th century, such as Busoni's Turandot and Schulhoff's Flammen in its 1994 premiere.

== Career ==
Born in Trofaiach, Prein first studied psychology, philosophy and pedagogy, before he turned to voice studies at the Graz Musikhochschule in 1977, with Herma Handl-Wiedenhofer. He began his career as a concert singer and lieder singer from 1979. In 1980, he made his stage debut in Krenek's Jonny spielt auf at the Theater an der Wien.

Prein received international recognition when he first appeared at the Bayreuth Festival in 1984, as Donner in Der Ring des Nibelungen. He then became a member of the Bern Opera, and moved in 1986 to the Musiktheater im Revier in Gelsenkirchen, where his roles included Wagner in Busoni's Doktor Faust. He appeared at the 1989 Salzburg Festival in a concert version of Orff's Antigonae.

Prein became a member of the Staatstheater Wiesbaden, where he performed in 1990 as Wotan in Wagner's Das Rheingold and Pizarro in Beethoven's Fidelio, in 1991 Sachs in Wagner's Die Meistersinger von Nürnberg, in 1993 the four demonic characters in Offenbach's Hoffmanns Erzählungen, in 1995 Don Magnifico in Rossini's La Cenerentola and in a concert performance Adahm in Rudi Stephan's Die ersten Menschen, in 1996 Ramfis in Verdi's Aida and Sarastro in Mozart's Die Zauberflöte. In 1997, he appeared as Kottwitz in Henze's Der Prinz von Homburg and Frank in Korngold's Die tote Stadt. In a 1998 performance of the Internationale Maifestspiele Wiesbaden, he performed Jochanaan in Salome by Richard Strauss.

Prein took part in the (late) premiere on 16 April 1994 of Erwin Schulhoff's complete Flammen, translated to German by Max Brod, in the role of the Commendatore. The concert performance at the Großer Sendesaal of the SFB in Berlin, with Deutsches Symphonie-Orchester Berlin, was conducted by John Mauceri. He performed as Robert in Guntram by R. Strauss in Montpellier, and as the Doctor in Alban Berg's Wozzeck at the Teatro Verdi in Triest in 1998.

== Recordings ==
Prein's recordings include lieder by Josef Matthias Hauer, Schreker's Der ferne Klang, and Viktor Ullmann's Der zerbrochene Krug. He took part in the first recording of Schulhoff's Flammen, his only opera which had been suppressed by the Nazis. In 1992, he recorded Pantalone in Busoni's Turandot, with the Berlin Radio Symphony Orchestra conducted by Gerd Albrecht. A reviewer noted his "crisp, clear enunciation". He recorded Hermann Suter's Le Laudi in a live recording of a 1998 concert of Chor von St. Bonifatius and children's choir, the Witold Lutoslawski Philharmonic Wroclaw with organist Petra Morath-Pusinelli, conducted by Gabriel Dessauer, and alongside Zofia Kilanowicz, Pamela Pantos and Andreas Karasiak.
