= Symphony No. 3 (Górecki) =

Symphony by Henryk Górecki

- Symphony of Sorrowful Songs
- by Henryk Górecki
- Cover of the 1992 release of Symphony No. 3, conducted by David Zinman with soprano Dawn Upshaw
- Opus: 36
- Text: I: Lamentation of the Holy Cross Monastery; II: Words from Helena Wanda Błażusiakówna; III: Silesian folk song
- Language: Polish
- Composed: 1976
- Published: 1977
- Movements: 3

Premiere
- Date: 4 April 1977
- Location: Royan, France
- Conductor: Ernest Bour
- Performers: Stefania Woytowicz (soprano), Southwest German Radio Symphony Orchestra

The Symphony No. 3, Op. 36, also known as the Symphony of Sorrowful Songs (Polish: Symfonia pieśni żałosnych), is a symphony in three movements composed by Henryk Górecki in Katowice, Poland, between October and December 1976. The work is indicative of the transition between Górecki's earlier dissonant style and his later more tonal style and "represented a stylistic breakthrough: austerely plaintive, emotionally direct and steeped in medieval modes". It was premièred on 4 April 1977, at the Royan International Festival, with Stefania Woytowicz as soprano and Ernest Bour as conductor.

A solo soprano sings Polish texts in each of the three movements. The first is a 15th-century Polish lament of Mary, mother of Jesus; the second a message written on the wall of a Gestapo cell during World War II; and the third a Silesian folk song of a mother searching for her son killed by the Germans in the Silesian uprisings. The first and third movements are written from the perspective of a parent who has lost a child, and the second movement from that of a child separated from a parent. The dominant themes of the symphony are motherhood, despair and suffering.

Until 1992, Górecki was known only to connoisseurs, primarily as one of several composers from the Polish School responsible for the postwar Polish music renaissance. That year, Elektra Nonesuch released a recording of the 15-year-old symphony performed by the London Sinfonietta that topped the classical charts in Britain and the United States. It has sold more than a million copies, vastly exceeding the expected lifetime sales of a typical symphonic recording by a 20th-century composer. This success, however, has not generated similar interest in Górecki's other works.

In May 2024, a very carefully handwritten copy of the score from the collection of the National Library of Poland, written by the composer himself, was presented to a permanent exhibition in the Palace of the Commonwealth.

== Background ==
Despite a political climate that was unfavorable to modern art (often denounced as "formalist" by the communist authorities), post-war Polish composers enjoyed an unprecedented degree of compositional freedom following the establishment of the Warsaw Autumn festival in 1956. Górecki had won recognition among avant-garde composers for the experimental, dissonant and serialist works of his early career; he became visible on the international scene through such modernist works as Scontri, which was a success at the 1960 Warsaw Autumn, and his First Symphony, which was awarded a prize at the 1961 Paris Youth Bienniale. Throughout the 1960s, he continued to form acquaintanceships with other experimental and serialist composers such as Pierre Boulez and Karlheinz Stockhausen.

During the 1970s, Górecki began to distance himself from the serialism and extreme dissonance of his earlier work, and his Third Symphony, like the preceding choral pieces Euntes ibant et flebant (Op. 32, 1972) and Amen (Op. 35, 1975), starkly rejects such techniques. The lack of harmonic variation in Górecki's Third Symphony, and its reliance on repetition, marked a stage in Górecki's progression towards the harmonic minimalism and the simplified textures of his more recent work. Because of the religious nature of many of his works during this period, critics and musicologists often align him with other modernist composers who began to explore radically simplified musical textures, tonality, and melody, and who also infused many of their works with religious significance. Like-minded composers, such as Arvo Pärt and John Tavener, are frequently grouped with Górecki under the term "holy minimalism", although none of the composers classified as such have admitted to common influences.

== Composition ==
In 1973, Górecki approached the Polish folklorist Adolf Dygacz in search of traditional melodies to incorporate in a new work. Dygacz presented four songs which had been recorded in the Silesia region in south-western Poland. Górecki was impressed by the melody "Where has he gone, my dear young son?" (Kajże się podzioł mój synocek miły?), which describes a mother's mourning for a son lost in war, and probably dates from the Silesian Uprisings of 1919–21. Górecki had heard a version of the song in the 1960s and had not been impressed by the arrangement, but the words and the melody of Dygacz's new version made a lasting impression on him. He said "for me, it is a wonderfully poetic text. I do not know if a 'professional' poet would create such a powerful entity out of such terse, simple words. It is not sorrow, despair or resignation, or the wringing of hands: it is just the great grief and lamenting of a mother who has lost her son."

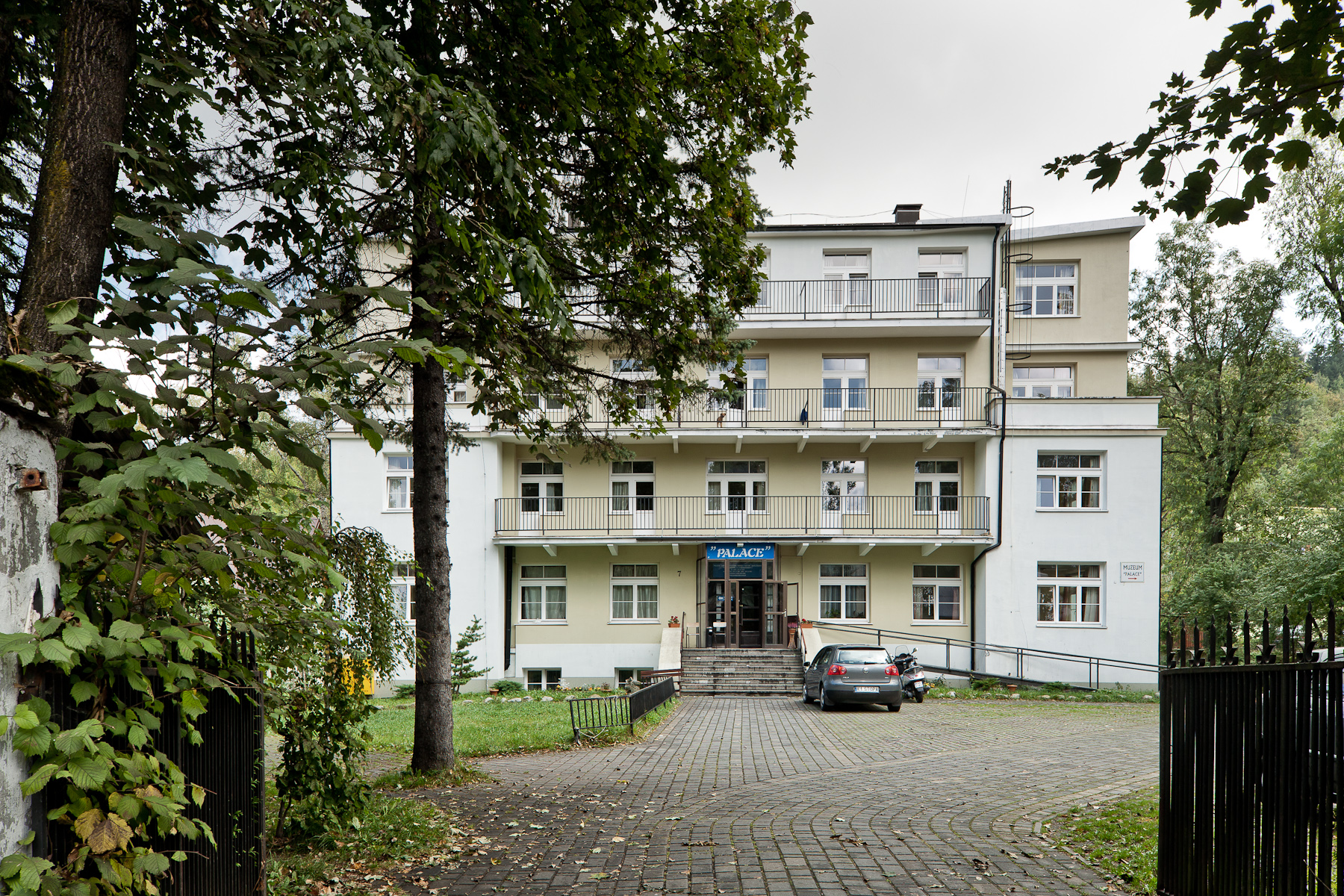
The Palace in Zakopane, the former Nazi Gestapo prison, was where the composer took an inscription scrawled on a cell wall for the composition of his symphony.

Later that year, Górecki learned of an inscription scrawled on the wall of a cell in a German Gestapo prison in the town of Zakopane, which lies at the foot of the Tatra Mountains in southern Poland. The words were those of 18-year-old Helena Wanda Błażusiakówna, a highland woman incarcerated on 25 September 1944. It read O Mamo, nie płacz, nie. Niebios Przeczysta Królowo, Ty zawsze wspieraj mnie (Oh Mamma do not cry, no. Immaculate Queen of Heaven, always support me). The composer recalled, "I have to admit that I have always been irritated by grand words, by calls for revenge. Perhaps in the face of death I would shout out in this way. But the sentence I found is different, almost an apology or explanation for having got herself into such trouble; she is seeking comfort and support in simple, short but meaningful words". He later explained, "In prison, the whole wall was covered with inscriptions screaming out loud: 'I'm innocent', 'Murderers', 'Executioners', 'Free me', 'You have to save me'—it was all so loud, so banal. Adults were writing this, while here it is an eighteen-year-old girl, almost a child. And she is so different. She does not despair, does not cry, does not scream for revenge. She does not think about herself; whether she deserves her fate or not. Instead, she only thinks about her mother: because it is her mother who will experience true despair. This inscription was something extraordinary. And it really fascinated me."

Górecki now had two texts: one from a mother to her son, the other from a daughter to her mother. While looking for a third that would continue the theme, he decided on a mid-15th-century folk song from the southern city of Opole. Its text contains a passage in which the Virgin Mary speaks to her Son dying on the cross: "O my son, beloved and chosen, Share your wounds with your mother ..." (Synku miły i wybrany, rozdziel z matką swoje rany ...). Górecki said, "this text was folk-like, anonymous. So now I had three acts, three persons ... Originally, I wanted to frame these texts with an introduction and a conclusion. I even chose two verses (5 and 6) from Psalm 93/94 in the translation by Wujek: 'They humiliated Your people, O Lord, and afflicted Your heritage, they killed the widow and the passer-by, murdered the orphans.'" However, he rejected this format because he believed the structure would position the work as a symphony "about war". Górecki sought to transcend such specifics, and instead structured the work as three independent laments.

== Instrumentation and score ==
The symphony is constructed around simple harmonies, set in a neo-modal style which makes use of the medieval musical modes, but does not adhere strictly to medieval rules of composition. A performance typically lasts about 54 minutes. Ronald Blum describes the piece as "mournful, like Mahler, but without the bombast of percussion, horns and choir, just the sorrow of strings and the lone soprano". The work consists of three elegiac movements, each marked Lento to indicate their slow tempi. Strings dominate the musical textures and the music is rarely loud—the dynamics reach fortissimo in only a few bars.

The symphony is scored for solo soprano, four flutes (two players doubling on piccolos), four clarinets in B♭, two bassoons, two contrabassoons, four horns in F, four trombones, harp, piano and strings. Górecki specifies exact complements for the string forces: 16 first violins, 16 second violins, 12 violas, 12 cellos, and 8 double basses. For most of the score, these are in turn divided into two parts, each notated on a separate staff. Thus the string writing is mainly in ten different parts, on ten separate staves. In some sections some of these parts are divided even further into separate parts, which are written on the same staff, so that ten staves are still used for a greater number of parts.

Unusually, the score omits oboes, English horns, bass clarinets, and trumpets. The bassoons, contrabassoons, and trombones play only in the first movement, and only for a few bars (bassoons and contrabassoons: 339–342 and 362–369; trombones: 343–348 and 367–369).

The musicologist Adrian Thomas notes that the symphony lacks dissonance outside of modal inflections (that is, occasional use of pitches that fall outside the mode), and that it does not require nonstandard techniques or virtuosic playing. Thomas further observes that "there is no second-hand stylistic referencing, although if predecessors were to be sought they might be found, distantly removed, in the music of composers as varied as Bach, Schubert, Tchaikovsky, and even Debussy."

=== I. Lento – Sostenuto tranquillo ma cantabile ===
Symphony No. 3, 1st movement
Sample of opening coda from the 1st movement.

Typically 27 minutes in duration, the first movement equals the combined length of the second and third movements, and is based on a late 15th-century lament of Mary from the Lysagora Songs collection of the Holy Cross Monastery (Św. Krzyż Monastery) in the Świętokrzyskie Mountains. Comprising three thematic sections, the movement opens with a canon based on a 24-bar theme, which is repeated several times. The canon begins in 2 parts; then, for each repetition of the theme, an extra part is added, until the canon is in eight parts (with the top two parts doubled at the octave, making for ten voices total), using a 24-bar melody in the Aeolian mode on E. It begins with the double basses, 2nd part, with each succeeding entry occurring one measure later (i.e., a new entry begins every 25 measures), each starting a diatonic fifth above the last. That means that each appearance of the melody in a new part is in a different mode, in this order:

1. Aeolian on E (double basses, 2nd part)
2. Phrygian on B (double basses, 1st part)
3. Locrian on F♯ (cellos, 2nd part)
4. Lydian on C (cellos, 1st part)
5. Ionian on G (violas, 2nd part)
6. Mixolydian on D (violas, 1st part)
7. Dorian on A (2nd violins, 2nd part)
8. Aeolian on E (1st violins, 2nd part)

After the 8-part canon is played, it is repeated, with the 1st parts of the 1st and 2nd violins (silent up to this point) doubling the other violin parts an octave higher.

After that, the canon continues, but the voices gradually drop out one by one, from the lowest upwards and the highest downwards; the instruments in question then double, or play the parts of, a higher or lower voice that is still playing, in this order ('→' means 'double/play the parts of'):

1. Double basses: 2nd part (low E Aeolian) → 1st part (B Phrygian) [canon reduced to 7 voices]
2. 1st violins: 1st part (highest E Aeolian) → 2nd part (high E Aeolian)
3. Double basses (B Phrygian) → Cellos, 2nd part (F♯ Locrian)
4. Cellos: 2nd part (F♯ Locrian) → 1st part (C Lydian) [canon reduced to 6 voices]
5. 2nd violins: 1st part (high A Dorian) → 2nd part (A Dorian)
6. Double basses (F♯ Locrian) → Cellos (C Lydian)
7. Cellos (C Lydian) → Violas, 2nd part (G Ionian)
8. 2nd violins (A Dorian) → Violas, 1st part (D Mixolydian)
9. 1st violins (high E Aeolian) → 2nd violins (A Dorian) [canon reduced to 4 voices]
10. Double basses fall silent
11. 1st violins (A Dorian) → 2nd violins + violas, 1st part (D Mixolydian) [canon reduced to 2 voices]

The canon ends with all the strings (except the double basses) sustaining a single note, E4.

The soprano enters on the same note in the second section and builds to a climax on the final word, at which point the strings enter forcefully with the climax of the opening canon. The third section of the movement (Lento—Cantabile semplice) is a long dénouement, another canon based on the same melody in the opening canon; but this time it starts with 8 parts (the top two doubled in octaves), and the voices drop out from high to low:

1. 1st violins: 1st part (highest E Aeolian) → 2nd part (high E Aeolian)
2. 2nd violins: 1st part (high A Dorian) → 2nd part (A Dorian)
3. 1st violins sustain an E5 drone
4. 2nd violins sustain an E4 drone as 1st violins fall silent
5. Violas: 1st part (D Mixolydian) → 2nd part (G Ionian)
6. Violas sustain an E3 drone as 2nd violins fall silent
7. Cellos: 1st part (C Lydian) → 2nd part (F♯ Locrian)
8. Cellos sustain an E2 drone as violas fall silent
9. Double Basses: 1st part (B Phrygian) → 2nd part (melody in low E Aeolian)

The movement thus ends with the lower strings, and the piano (briefly recalling the second section of the movement).

=== II. Lento e largo – Tranquillissimo ===
Symphony No. 3, 2nd movement
Sample from the 2nd movement

The nine-minute second movement is for soprano, clarinets, horns, harp, piano, and strings, and contains a libretto formed from the prayer to the Virgin Mary inscribed by Helena Błażusiakówna on the cell wall in Zakopane. According to the composer, "I wanted the second movement to be of a highland character, not in the sense of pure folklore, but the climate of Podhale ... I wanted the girl's monologue as if hummed ... on the one hand almost unreal, on the other towering over the orchestra."

The movement opens with a folk drone, A–E, and a melodic fragment, E–G♯–F♯, which alternate with sudden plunges to a low B♭–D♭ dyad. Thomas describes the effect as "almost cinematic ... suggest[ing] the bright open air of the mountains". As the soprano begins to sing, her words are supported by the orchestra until she reaches a climaxing top A♭. The movement is resolved when the strings hold a chord without diminuendo for nearly one and a half minutes. The final words of the movement are the first two lines of the Polish Ave Maria, sung twice on a repeated pitch by the soprano.

=== III. Lento – Cantabile-semplice ===
Symphony No. 3, 3rd movement
Sample from the 3rd movement

The tempo of the third movement is similar to that of the previous two, and subtle changes in dynamism and mode make it more complex and involving than it may at first appear. With a duration of approximately seventeen minutes, it comprises three verses in A minor and, like the first movement, is constructed from evolving variations on a simple motif. The melody is established in the opening verse, and the second and third verses revisit the cradling motifs of the second movement. As in the second movement, the motifs are built up from inversions of plain triads and seventh chords stretching across several octaves. As the soprano sings the final words, the key changes to a pure diatonic A major which accompanies, in writer David Ellis's words, the "ecstatic final stanza":

O sing for him / God's little song-birds / Since his mother cannot find him.
And you, God's little flowers / May you blossom all around / that my son may sleep a happy sleep.

The orchestra returns to A minor before a final postlude in A major. In Górecki's own words: "Finally there came that unvarying, persistent, obstinate 'walczyk' [on the chord of A], sounding well when played piano, so that all the notes were audible. For the soprano, I used a device characteristic of highland singing: suspending the melody on the third [C♯] and descending from the fifth to the third while the ensemble moves stepwise downward [in sixths]".

== Interpretation ==
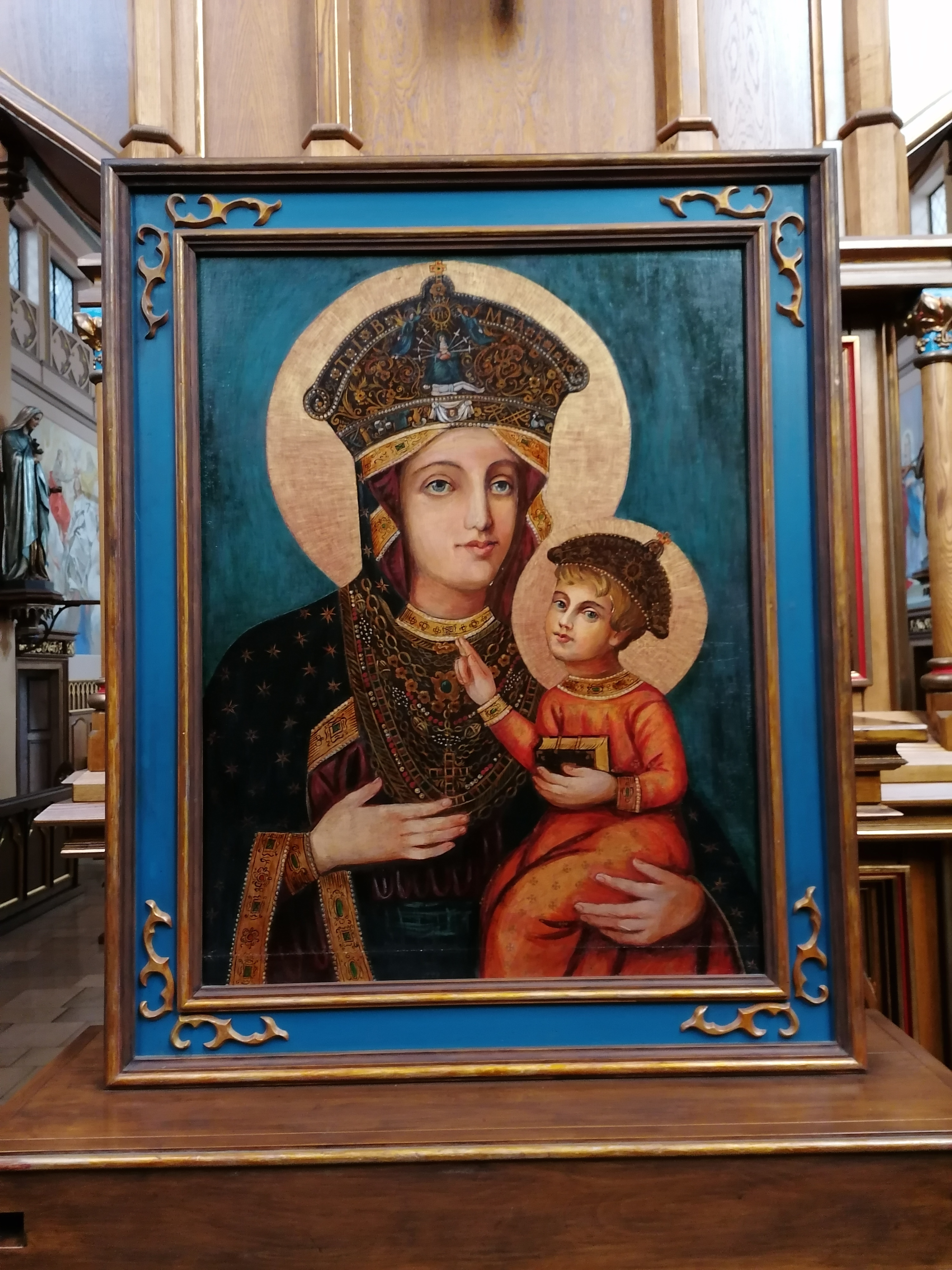
Madonna and Child, 15th century (venerated in Górecki's Katowice)

The symphony was dedicated to Górecki's wife Jadwiga Rurańska. When asked why, Górecki responded, "Who was I supposed to dedicate it to?" He never sought to explain the symphony as a response to a political or historical event. Instead, he maintained that the work is an evocation of the ties between mother and child. Górecki was commissioned to write music in response to the Holocaust in the 1960s but was unable to finish any of the pieces he started for that purpose. While Górecki stated that for many years he sought to produce a work specifically in response to Auschwitz, he resisted that interpretation of the symphony, which he preferred to be viewed in a wider context. Other critics have attempted to interpret the symphony in spiritual terms, an approach which Górecki also dismissed. Still others have suggested that the symphony can be understood as a compendium of Polish history:

The symphony alludes to each of the main historical and political developments in Poland's history from the 14th century to 1976, the year of its composition. What is more, each of the three movements appears to represent a different age . . . and [they are] chronologically contiguous. The composer seems to have created three separate and discrete "chapters" in his summary of Poland's history.

Górecki said of the work, "Many of my family died in concentration camps. I had a grandfather who was in Dachau, an aunt in Auschwitz. You know how it is between Poles and Germans. But Bach was a German too—and Schubert, and Strauss. Everyone has his place on this little earth. That's all behind me. So the Third Symphony is not about war; it's not a Dies Irae; it's a normal Symphony of Sorrowful Songs."

== Reception and legacy ==
=== Initial ===
Górecki's Symphony No. 3 was written in 1976, when Górecki was, in the words of the music critic Jane Perlez, "a fiery figure, fashionable only among a small circle of modern-music aficionados". The 1977 world première at the Royan Festival, Ernest Bour conducting, was reviewed by six western critics, all of them harshly dismissive. Heinz Koch, writing for Musica, said that the symphony "drags through three old folk melodies (and nothing else) for an endless 55 minutes". Górecki recalled that, at the premiere, he sat next to a "prominent French musician", probably Pierre Boulez, who, after hearing the twenty-one repetitions of an A-major chord at the end of the symphony, loudly exclaimed: "Merde!"

The symphony was first recorded in Poland in 1978 by the soprano Stefania Woytowicz. It was deemed a masterpiece by Polish critics, although, during the late 1970s and early 1980s, recordings and performances were widely criticised by the press outside Poland. The symphony drew hostility from critics who felt that Górecki had moved too far away from the established avant-garde style and was, according to Dietmar Polaczek (writing for Österreichische Musikzeitschrift), "simply adding to the decadent trash that encircled the true pinnacles of avant-gardism".

=== Increasing recognition ===
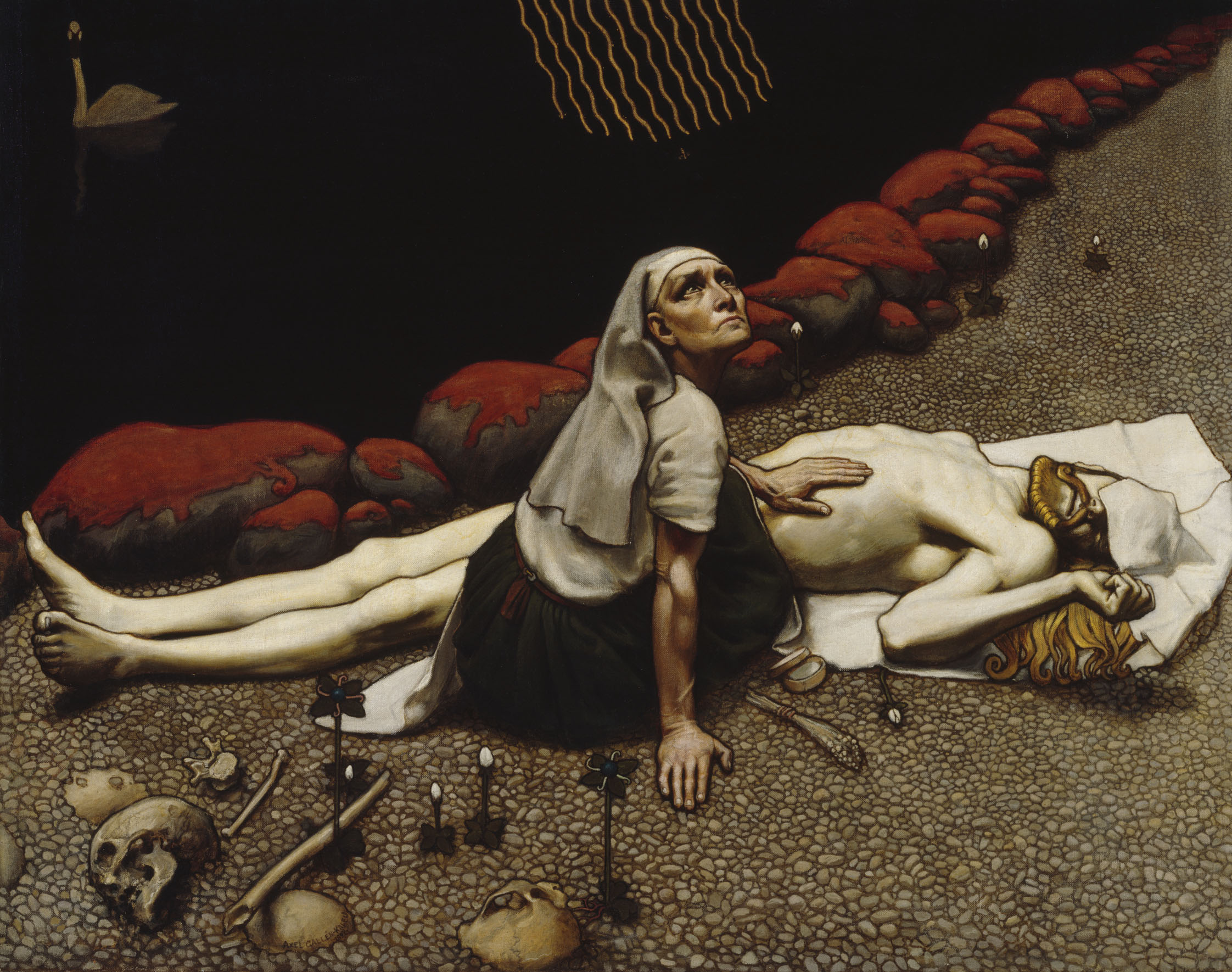
Lemminkäinen's Mother (1897) by Akseli Gallen-Kallela is an earlier evocation of the themes of motherhood and war explored in Górecki's Third Symphony. This work depicts a scene from the Finnish epic poem Kalevala.

In 1985, the French filmmaker Maurice Pialat featured a section of the third movement in the credits of his film Police. When the work was later repackaged as a "soundtrack album", it sold well. Although Gorecki's name was featured prominently on the front cover, the sleeve notes on the back provided little information about the work, and Górecki's name appeared in smaller type than those of the main actors.

In the mid-1980s, the British industrial music group Test Dept used the symphony as a backdrop for video collages during their concerts to express sympathy with the Polish Solidarity movement, which Górecki also supported (his 1981 piece Miserere was composed in part as a response to government opposition of Solidarity trade unions).

=== London Sinfonietta recording and commercial success ===
During the late 1980s, the symphony received increasing airplay on US and British classical radio stations, notably Classic FM (From 1992). The fall of communism helped to spread the popularity of Polish music generally, and by 1990 the symphony was being performed in major cities such as New York, London and Sydney.

A 1991 recording with the London Sinfonietta, conducted by David Zinman and featuring the soloist Dawn Upshaw, was released in 1992 by the Elektra imprint Nonesuch Records. Within two years, it sold more than 700,000 copies worldwide; it reached number 6 on the mainstream UK album charts, and while it did not appear on the US Billboard 200, it topped the US classical charts for 38 weeks and stayed on the chart for 138 weeks. The Zinman/Upshaw recording has sold over a million copies, making it probably the best selling contemporary classical record.

Michael Steinberg described the symphony's success as essentially a phenomenon of the compact disc. While live performances are still given, they do not always sell out. Some critics, wondering at the sudden success of the piece nearly two decades after its composition, suggest that it resonated with a particular mood in the popular culture at the time. Stephen Johnson, writing in A guide to the symphony, wondered whether the success was "a flash in the pan" or would have lasting significance. In 1998, Steinberg asked, "[are people] really listening to this symphony? How many CD buyers discover that fifty-four minutes of very slow music with a little singing in a language they don't understand is more than they want? Is it being played as background music to Chardonnay and brie?" Steinberg compared the success of Górecki's symphony to the Doctor Zhivago phenomenon of 1958: "Everybody rushed to buy the book; few managed actually to read it. The appearance of the movie in 1965 rescued us all from the necessity." Górecki was as surprised as anyone else at the recording's success, and later speculated that "perhaps people find something they need in this piece of music…. Somehow I hit the right note, something they were missing. Something, somewhere had been lost to them. I feel that I instinctively knew what they needed."

At least a dozen recordings were issued in the wake of the success of the Nonesuch recording, and the work enjoyed significant exposure in a number of artistic media worldwide and became a best-selling and multi-award winning DVD by Tony Palmer, made for The South Bank Show on ITV, and uniquely shown without commercial breaks. It was also used by several other filmmakers in the 1990s and onwards to elicit a sense of pathos or sorrow, including as an accompaniment to a plane crash in Peter Weir's Fearless (1993), and in the soundtrack to Julian Schnabel's Basquiat (1996), in the Netflix series (season 2, episode 7) The Crown, and in Terrence Malick's A Hidden Life (2019). An art gallery in Santa Fe, New Mexico opened an exhibit in 1995 dedicated entirely to visual art inspired by the piece.

In 2017 Canadian choreographer Crystal Pite set the first movement of the symphony as a ballet called Flight Pattern, commissioned by the Royal Opera House. In 2022 she expanded this into a setting of all three movements, Light of Passage.

== Discography ==
| Year | Soprano | Conductor | Orchestra | Label |
|---|---|---|---|---|
| 1978 | Stefania Woytowicz | Jerzy Katlewicz | Polish National Radio Symphony Orchestra (Katowice) | Polskie Nagrania 1980, 1993, 2010, 2017 |
| 1982 | Stefania Woytowicz | Włodzimierz Kamirski | Radio-Symphonie-Orchester Berlin | Koch Schwann 1988 |
| 1985 | Stefania Woytowicz | Ernest Bour | SWR Sinfonieorchester Baden-Baden | Erato 1985, Belart 1993, Apex 2003 |
| 1987 | Stefania Woytowicz | Jerzy Katlewicz | Polish National Radio Symphony Orchestra (Katowice) | Olympia 1988 |
| 1992 | Dawn Upshaw | David Zinman | London Sinfonietta | Nonesuch (Warner) |
| 1993 | Zofia Kilanowicz | Jerzy Swoboda | Polish State Philharmonic Orchestra of Katowice | Karusell UK 1994 |
| 1993 | Zofia Kilanowicz | Jacek Kaspszyk | Kraków Philharmonic Orchestra | EMI Classics 1995, 1999, HMV Classics 1997 |
| 1994 | Zofia Kilanowicz | Antoni Wit | Polish National Radio Symphony Orchestra (Katowice) | Naxos |
| 1994 | Joanna Kozłowska | Kazimierz Kord | Warsaw National Philharmonic Orchestra | Philips |
| 1994 | Luisa Castellani | Anton Nanut | Slovenian Symphony Orchestra | Audiophile Classics |
| 1995 | Doreen de Feis | Adrian Leaper | Orquesta Filarmónica de Gran Canaria | Arte Nova |
| 2004 | Yvonne Kenny | Takuo Yuasa | Adelaide Symphony Orchestra | ABC Classics |
| 2006 | Ingrid Perruche | Alain Altinoglu | Sinfonia Varsovia | Naive V5019 |
| 2007 | Susan Gritton | Yuri Simonov | Royal Philharmonic Orchestra | Allegro |
| 2009 | Christine Brewer | Donald Runnicles | Atlanta Symphony Orchestra | Telarc CD80699 |
| 2012 | Isabel Bayrakdarian | John Axelrod | Danish National Symphony Orchestra | Sony |
| 2016 | Barbara Tritt | Bohdan Boguszewski | Szczecin Philharmonic | DUX 1200 |
| 2018 | Ewa Izykowska | Andrzej Boreyko | Poznań Philharmonic Orchestra | DUX 1459 |
| 2019 | Beth Gibbons | Krzysztof Penderecki | Polish National Radio Symphony Orchestra | Domino Records |
| 2020 | Lisa Gerrard | Yordan Kamdzhalov | Genesis Orchestra | Sony Classical |

== Sources ==
- Górecki, Henryk Mikołaj (2003). "Remarks on Performing the Third Symphony". Polish Music Journal. 6 (2). Archived from the original on 18 October 2012.
- Howard, Luke B. (1998). "Motherhood, Billboard, and the Holocaust: Perceptions and Receptions of Górecki's Symphony No. 3". The Musical Quarterly. 82 (1): 131–159. doi:10.1093/mq/82.1.131. JSTOR 742238.
- Howard, Luke B. (2007). "Henryk M. Górecki Symphony No.3 (1976) as a Symbol of Polish Political History". The Polish Review. 52 (2): 215–222. JSTOR 25779666.
- Jacobson, Bernard (1995). A Polish Renaissance. London: Phaidon. ISBN 0-7148-3251-0.
- Layton, Robert, ed. (1995). A Guide To The Symphony. Oxford: Oxford University Press. ISBN 0-19-288005-5.
- Steinberg, Michael (1998). The Symphony: A Listener's Guide. New York, NY: Oxford University Press. ISBN 0-19-512665-3.
- Thomas, Adrian (1997). Górecki. Oxford Studies of Composers. Oxford: Clarendon Press. ISBN 0-19-816394-0.
- Thomas, Adrian (2005). Polish Music Since Szymanowski. London: Cambridge University Press. ISBN 0-521-58284-9.
