= Stefania Woytowicz =

Polish concert soprano

Stefania Woytowicz (8 October 1922, Orynyn, Kamianets-Podilskyi Raion – 31 August 2005, Warsaw) was a Polish concert soprano. Woytowicz was the soprano soloist in the first public performance of Henryk Górecki's Symphony No. 3 (Symphony of Sorrowful Songs), and sang the part on the first recordings of the symphony.
