= Erwin Schulhoff =

Czech composer and pianist

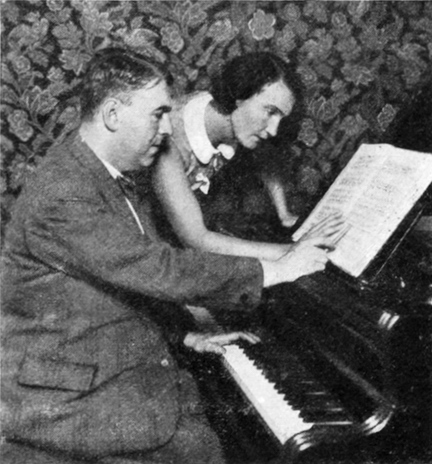
- Schulhoff and dancer Milča Mayerová, c. 1931
- Born: 8 June 1894; Prague, Bohemia, Austria-Hungary (now Czech Republic)
- Died: 18 August 1942 (aged 48); Weißenburg, Bavaria, Greater German Reich (now Federal Republic of Germany)
- Occupations: Composer, pianist

Erwin Schulhoff (Czech: Ervín Schulhoff; 8 June 1894 – 18 August 1942) was an Austro-Czech composer and pianist. He was one of the figures in the generation of European musicians whose successful careers were prematurely terminated by the rise of the Nazi regime in Germany and whose works have been rarely noted or performed beyond Czechoslovakia until the 1980s.

== Life ==
Schulhoff was born in Prague into a German family of Ashkenazi Jewish ancestry. His father Gustav Schulhoff was a wool merchant from Prague and his mother Louise Wolff from Frankfurt. The pianist and composer Julius Schulhoff was his great-uncle.

Antonín Dvořák encouraged Schulhoff's earliest musical studies, which began at the Prague Conservatory when he was ten years old. He studied composition and piano there and later in Vienna, Leipzig (1908-1909), and Cologne; where his teachers included Claude Debussy, Max Reger, Fritz Steinbach, and Willi Thern. He won the Mendelssohn Prize twice, for piano in 1913 and for composition in 1918. He served on the Russian front in the Austro-Hungarian army during World War I. He was wounded and was in an Italian prisoner-of-war camp when the war ended. He lived in Germany after the war before returning in 1923 to Prague, where he joined the faculty of the conservatory in 1929.

He was one of the first generation of classical composers to find inspiration in the rhythms of jazz music. Schulhoff also embraced the avant-garde influence of Dadaism in his performances and compositions after World War I. When organizing concerts of avant-garde music in 1919, he included this manifesto:

Absolute art is revolution, it requires additional facets for development, leads to overthrow (coups) in order to open new paths...and is the most powerful in music.... The idea of revolution in art has evolved for decades, under whatever sun the creators live, in that for them art is the commonality of man. This is particularly true in music, because this art form is the liveliest, and as a result reflects the revolution most strongly and deeply–the complete escape from imperialistic tonality and rhythm, the climb to an ecstatic change for the better.

Schulhoff occasionally performed as a pianist in the Prague Free Theatre. He also toured Germany, France and England performing his own works, contemporary classical compositions, and jazz.

His 1921 Suite for Chamber Orchestra, in one critic's words, "is stylistically mixed, with jazz-like numbers...encompassing two slow affecting ones...as if the clown of Die Wolkenpumpe has let the mask slip as he recalled the horrors and absurdities of the trenches." He wrote in a letter to his friend Alban Berg in 1921:

I am boundlessly fond of nightclub dancing, so much so that I have periods during which I spend whole nights dancing with one hostess or another...out of pure enjoyment of the rhythm and with my subconscious filled with sensual delight.... [T]hereby I acquire phenomenal inspiration for my work, as my conscious mind is incredibly earthly, even animal as it were.

Olin Downes praised a performance of Schulhoff's Five Pieces for String Quartet at the 1924 Festival of the International Society for Contemporary Music in Salzburg:

These pieces attempted only to charm or entertain. They had spontaneous humor, sentiment, a fluent and admirable technic. The idiom has enough modern pepper in it to constantly stimulate the ear; but the music is not forced, any more than it is portentous. A young composer of talent disported himself in these pieces, and his audience was duly grateful. Not all composers, old or young, have the good sense not to take themselves, now and again, too seriously.

Downes reported that following the performance Schulhoff played American ragtime numbers on piano at a local inn "till the walls tottered".

In 1928, the Flonzaley Quartet played the String Quartet No. 1 at their farewell New York concert between works of Beethoven and Brahms, and it was greeted enthusiastically. A 1930 performance of Schulhoff's Partita by Walter Gieseking proved to be the audience's favorite work of the recital "to judge from the applause and laughter" wrote one reviewer, "which greeted the sections bearing such titles as 'All Art is Useless' and 'Alexander, Alexander, You Are a Salamander'."

He composed his Concerto for String Quartet and Wind Orchestra in 1930, which provides, in one critic's estimation, "a fascinating inversion of the traditional concerto grosso style, with winds providing the framework of the piece as a whole, within which the string quartet appears as contrast and solo."

In the 1930s, Schulhoff faced mounting personal and professional difficulties. Because of his Jewish descent and his radical politics, he and his works were labelled "degenerate" and blacklisted by the Nazi regime. He could no longer give recitals in Germany, nor could his works be performed publicly.

His communist sympathies, which became increasingly evident in his works, also brought him trouble in Czechoslovakia. In 1932 he composed a musical version of The Communist Manifesto (Op. 82). Taking refuge in Prague, Schulhoff found employment as a radio pianist, but earned barely enough to cover the cost of everyday essentials. When the Nazis invaded Czechoslovakia in 1939, he had to perform under a pseudonym. In 1941, the Soviet Union approved his petition for citizenship, but he was arrested and imprisoned before he could leave Czechoslovakia.

In June 1941, Schulhoff was deported to the Wülzburg prison near Weißenburg, Bavaria. He died there on 18 August 1942 from tuberculosis.

== Musical style ==
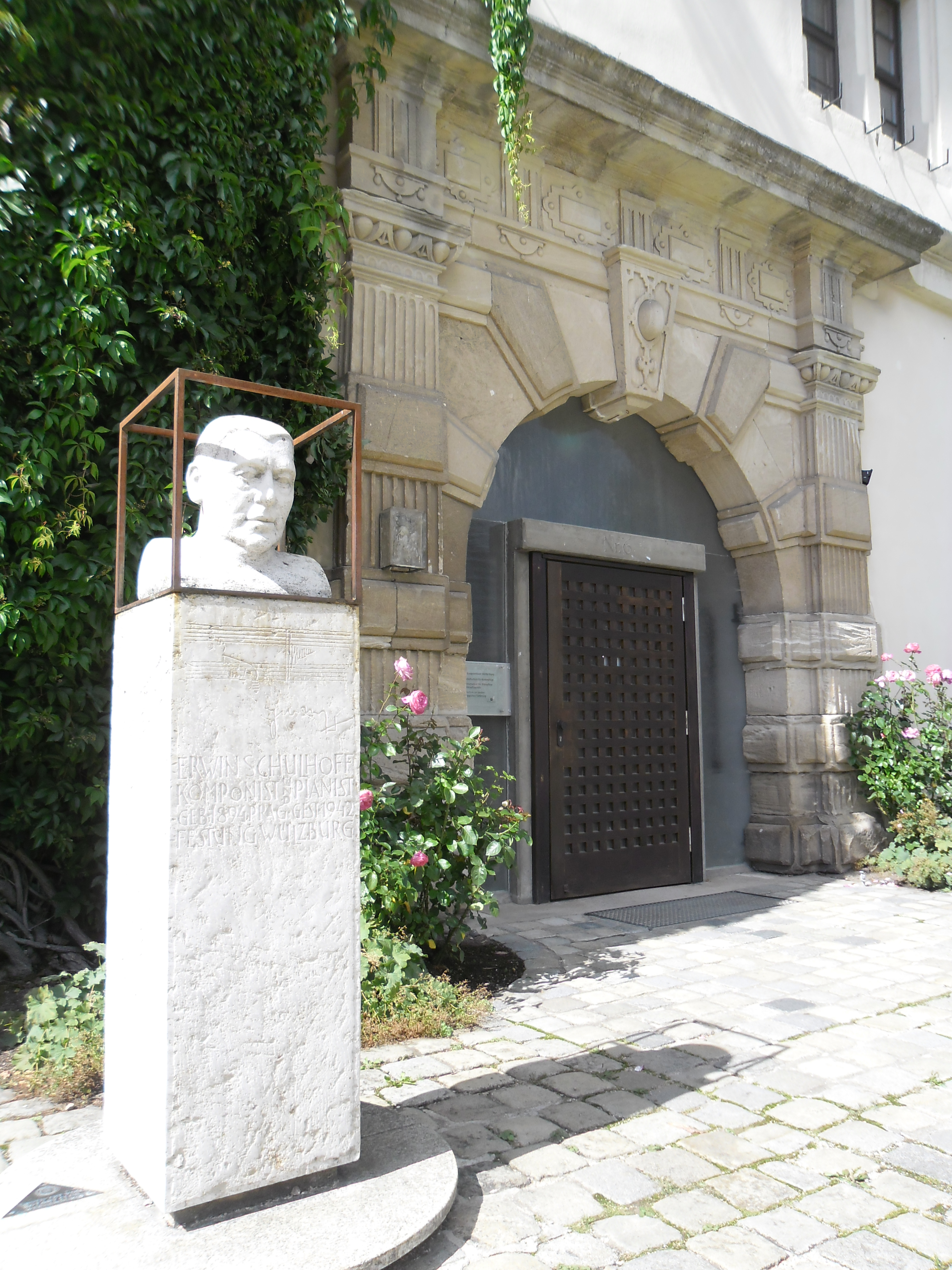
This bust of Erwin Schulhoff in the fortress Wülzburg near Weißenburg in Bayern was created by Reinhart Fuchs and inaugurated on 2 October 2004.

Schulhoff went through a number of distinct stylistic periods, ranging, in Anne Midgette's words, "from the endearing self-consciousness of talented youth in the Suite for Chamber Orchestra to the fierce somber aggression of the Fifth Symphony." She found that even as his style changed there was a certain commonality, so that even the "angular, forceful, even raw style" of the late Fifth Symphony reflected "the late Romantic tradition of orchestral color".

His early works exhibit the influence of composers from the preceding generation, including Debussy, Scriabin, and Richard Strauss. Later, during his Dadaist phase, Schulhoff composed a number of pieces with absurdist elements. Anticipating John Cage's 4′33″ by more than thirty years, Schulhoff's In futurum (part of Fünf Pittoresken for piano, written in 1919) is a silent piece composed entirely of rests, with the interpretative instruction "tutto il canzone con espressione e sentimento ad libitum, sempre, sin al fine" ("the whole piece with free expression and feeling, always, until the end"). The composition is notated in great rhythmic detail, employing bizarre time signatures and intricate rhythmic patterns. A 1923 report of a Bochum performance puts Schulhoff in the context of his contemporaries:

The patience of the town of Bochum was sorely tried by four composers of the most modern tendency in one concert. Six Orchestral Pieces by A. von Webern...were received with strong distrust; the warmer blooded Bela Bartok could not restore confidence with his orchestral pieces. But when the most extreme modern Erwin Schulhoff presented his "thirty-two absurd variations upon a no less eccentric theme," opposition began to make itself felt and heard. The theme, according to the program, was played twice, and the weather began to look threatening. At the end of the helpless variations strong men who were provided with instruments for the purpose made a noise described in German as "höllenlärm", which was answered by equally noisy applause. The composer made a speedy escape.

Schulhoff's third period dates from approximately 1923 to 1932. The pieces composed during these years, his most prolific years as a composer, are the most frequently performed of his works, including the String Quartet No. 1 and Five Pieces for String Quartet, which integrate modernist vocabulary, neoclassical elements, jazz, and dance rhythms from a variety of sources and cultures. He thought of jazz as a dance idiom and in a 1924 essay expressed the view that no one, including Stravinsky and Auric, had yet successfully blended jazz and art music. Performers of his Sonata for Violin and Piano No. 2 (1927) have described how it "draws liberally on the composers interests and abilities as a bona fide jazzman, acerbic wit and dance aficionado" and said its andante has "the kind of expressivity you find in the music of Berg". One critic has written that "Schulhoff's notion of what constitutes jazz is as surreal as some of the Dadaist texts he set...; some of the music is rather more indebted to de Falla and Russian Orientalism than ragtime or anything trans-Atlantic." He thought that innovations like an entire movement of the Suite for Chamber Orchestra (1921) for percussion alone and the use of the siren in another "would have seemed outlandish enough in 1921, even if it all sounds a bit tame now [1995]." A New York Times critic in 1932 called the Duo for violin and cello (1925) "long-winded and even insincere", while a performance in 2012 noted it was dedicated to Janáček, evokes Ravel's Sonata for Violin and Cello and "blends folk and contemporary elements" while employing "a range of sonorities and effects like dramatic pizzicatos" while "vivacious Hungarian fiddle playing enlivens the Zingaresca movement".

His jazz oratorio H.M.S. Royal Oak is based on the true story of the "Royal Oak affair", in which two Royal Navy officers were court-martialled for writing letters of complaint about the conduct of their Flag Admiral. Schulhoff casts his oratorio as the tale of a mutiny breaking out when a superior officer prohibits jazz on board.

The final period of his career was dedicated to socialist realism, with Communist ideology frequently in the foreground.

In general, Schulhoff's music remains connected to Western tonality, though—like Prokofiev, among others—the fundamentally triadic conception of his music is often embellished by passages of intense dissonance. Other features characteristic of Schulhoff's compositional style are use of modal and quartal harmonies, dance rhythms, and a comparatively free approach to form. The work of the Second Viennese School was also important to Schulhoff, though he never adopted serialism as a compositional tool.

The papers of conferences in Cologne (1992) and in Düsseldorf (1994) focused on Schulhoff's work have been published.

== Personal life ==
In August 1921 he married Alice Libochowitz. The following year he moved to Berlin in an effort to write musical parallels to the work of George Grosz.

== Selected works ==
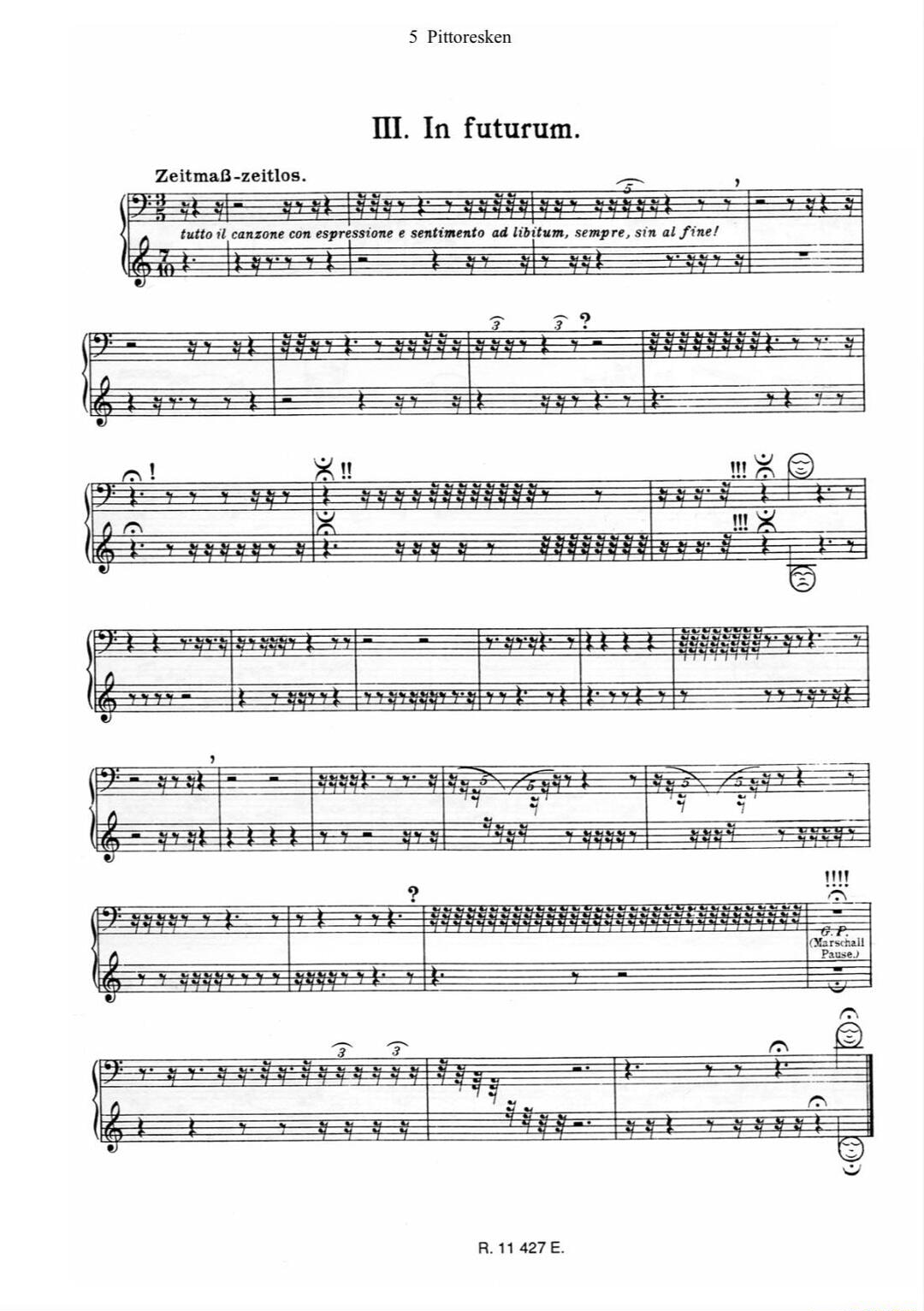
Page of rests, from the score of "In Futurum" (the middle movement of the Fünf Pittoresken), with the instruction "tuto il canzone con espressione e sentimento ad libitum, sempre, sin al fine!" ("the entire song with as much expression and feeling as you like, always, right to the end!")

- 5 Etudes de jazz for piano (c.1910–1920)
- Violin Sonata No. 1, Op.7 (1913)
- Piano Concerto No. 1, Op.11 (1913)
- Divertimento for String Quartet (1914)
- Cello Sonata (1914)
- String Quartet No. 0, Op.25 (1918)
- Sonata Erotica for female voice solo (1919), "in which a soprano spends several minutes faking a carefully notated orgasm"
- Fünf Pittoresken ("Five Picturesques") for piano (1919) Includes a silent middle movement, with complexly-notated rests.
- Symphonia Germanica (1919), a satire against German militarism
- Suite for Chamber Orchestra (1921), originally called In the New Style, six dances, "this bouncy, even silly work features instruments never used in the classical repertoire before, like slide whistles and car horns"
- Cloud-Pump (Die Wolkenpumpe) (1922), songs for baritone, four winds and percussion, to texts by "the holy ghost Hans Arp"
- Bassnachtigall for contrabassoon (1922), "in which a solo contrabassoon does its best to make soulful liquid birdcalls"
- Piano Concerto No. 2, "alla Jazz" (1923)
- Five Pieces for String Quartet (Fünf Stücke für Streichquartett) (1923)
- Ogelala, Ballettmysterium nach antik-mexikanischem Original, ballet (1923)
- String Sextet (1920–24)
- String Quartet No. 1 (1924)
- Piano Sonata No. 1 (1924)
- String Quartet No. 2 (1925)
- Concertino for flute, viola and double bass (1925)
- Symphony No. 1 (1925)
- Die Mondsüchtige ('Moonstruck'), Tanzgroteske (ballet) (1925)
- Piano Sonata No. 2 (1926)
- Piano Sonata No. 3 (1927)
- Violin Sonata No. 2 (1927)
- Sonata for Flute and Piano (1927)
- Double Concerto for Flute, Piano and Orchestra (1927), neo-classical in flavor
- 6 Esquisses de jazz for piano (1927)
- Divertisement (1927), for oboe, clarinet, and bassoon
- Flammen, opera (1927–29)
- Hot Sonate for alto saxophone and piano (1930)
- Concerto for String Quartet and Wind Orchestra (1930)
- Suite dansante en jazz for piano (1931), in six dance movements: "a short fast Stomp, a languorous Strait, a parodistic Waltz, a sensuous Tango, a languid Slow, and...a fast and lascivious Fox Trot"
- Symphony No. 2 (1932), "a mondane [sic] and brilliant work with a jazz scherzo, highly typical of the composer"
- Das kommunistische Manifest, oratorio (1932)
- Orinoco (1934), a fox trot
- Symphony No. 3 (1935)
- HMS Royal Oak (1935), jazz oratorio for narrator, soprano, tenor, mixed choir and symphonic jazz orchestra, based on text by Otto Rombach
- Symphony No. 4 (1937)
- Symphony No. 5 (1938–39)
- Symphony No. 6 "Svobody" for chorus and orchestra (1940)
- Symphony No. 7, in piano score only (1941–42)
- Symphony No. 8, incomplete, in piano score only (1941–42)
- Suite for Violin and Piano
- Variations on an original Dorian theme and Fugato, op. 10, theme, 15 variations, and fugue (date?)

== See also ==
- Eye music
