= Zofia Kilanowicz =

Polish soprano

- Born: 15 May 1963 (age 62); Nowy Targ, Poland
- Education: Academy of Music in Kraków
- Occupation: Operatic soprano

Zofia Kilanowicz (born 15 May 1963) is a Polish operatic soprano who has performed internationally, with a focus on Polish music. She appeared as Roxana in Szymanowski's King Roger in Paris and New York City, and recorded Górecki's Second Symphony (Copernican Symphony) and Third Symphony (Symphony of Sorrowful Songs).

== Life ==
She was born in Nowy Targ. After graduating from the School of Music in her hometown, she studied at the Academy of Music in Kraków with Helena Łazarska. Already during her studies, she was a prize winner of the Ada Sari Vocal Art Competition in Nowy Sącz (1986), the Karol Szymanowski Competition in Łódź, and the Karol Szymanowski Competition in Karlovy Vary. She received the Elly Ameling Award at the International Vocal Competition 's-Hertogenbosch in 1988.

Kilanowicz made her debut at the Warsaw Chamber Opera in 1989, as Konstanze in Mozart's Die Entführung aus dem Serail. In 1990, she first performed at La Monnaie in Brussels, as Drusilla in Monteverdi's L'incoronazione di Poppea, and remained a soloist of the house for ten years. Her roles also include Monteverdi's Poppea in L'incoronazione di Poppea, Mozart's La clemenza di Tito, Domenico Scarlatti's Il trionfo dell amore, Viktor Ullmann's Der Kaiser von Atlantis, and Beethoven's Fidelio. She has performed at opera houses in Brussels, Liège, Paris and Salzburg, among others. She appeared at the Théâtre des Champs-Élysées in Paris as Roxana in Szymanowski's King Roger conducted by Charles Dutoit, in a performance that travelled to Carnegie Hall in New York City, and was recorded.

== Recordings ==
Kilanowicz recorded for the Polish Radio. She recorded Mozart's Requiem in 1991, Górecki's Third Symphony for Naxos in 1993, with the Polish National Radio Symphony conducted by Antoni Wit, and Chopin's Polish Songs in 1994. In 1998, she was the soprano soloist in Hermann Suter's Le Laudi performed at St. Bonifatius, Wiesbaden, by Chor von St. Bonifatius and children's choir, the Witold Lutoslawski Philharmonic Wroclaw with organist Petra Morath-Pusinelli, conducted by Gabriel Dessauer, and alongside Pamela Pantos, Andreas Karasiak and Johann-Werner Prein. In 2000, she recorded song cycles by Karol Szymanowski, Songs of the Infatuated Muezzin, Op. 42, and Słopiewnie, Op. 46b, with the London Philharmonic Orchestra conducted by Leon Botstein. She also recorded Górecki's Copernican Symphony with baritone Andrzej Dobber, choirs and the Polish National Radio Symphony Orchestra in Katowice, conducted by Wit. She took part in a DVD recording of Górecki's Third Symphony by the Polish Radio in 2003, with the National Polish Radio Symphony Orchestra conducted by the composer. This recording was also released as a Hybrid Multichannel Super Audio CD and later on Blu-ray to commemorate the 70th anniversary of the outbreak of World War II and the 20th anniversary of Poland regaining its freedom. It received the Fryderyk Award 2006 in the category Contemporary Music.

== Awards ==
Kilanowicz received the Annual Award of the Minister of Culture and National Heritage in 2006, and the Medal of Merit from the city of Nowy Targ.
