= Five Pieces for String Quartet (Schulhoff) =

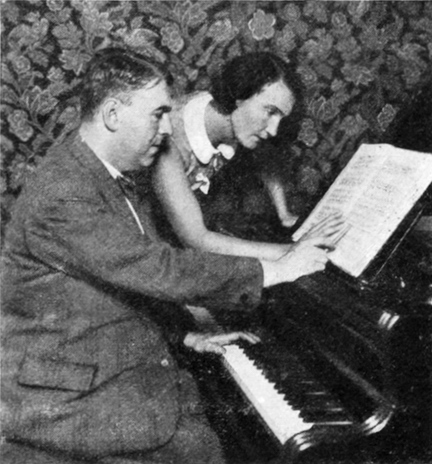
Erwin Schulhoff and dancer Milča Mayerová, c. 1931

The Fünf Stücke für Streichquartett (Five Pieces for String Quartet) is a suite of five musical pieces by Czech composer Erwin Schulhoff. The work contains stylistic connections to both a baroque dance suite and to other pieces composed by the Second Viennese School. The piece premiered on 8 August 1924 at the International Society for New Music Festival in Salzburg, and was dedicated to Darius Milhaud.

== Structure ==
Each of the pieces evokes a different style of dance music:

1. Viennese Waltz
2. Serenade
3. Czech folk music
4. Tango
5. Tarantella

== Reception ==
Robin Holloway described the work as a "parody and debunking", similar to later works by Aaron Copland and Benjamin Britten.
