= Helena Błażusiakówna =

Polish WWII prisoner

Helena Wanda Błażusiakówna (4 February 1926 – 25 July 1999) was a Polish girl whose prayer, scratched on a cell wall during arrest by Nazis in 1944, was set to music by Henryk Górecki in his Symphony No. 3 Sorrowful Songs. She was born in Szczawnica, a town in the far south of Poland only half a mile from the border with Slovakia, and was a member of the Góral ("mountain dweller") community, which spanned the border with Czechoslovakia in the Tatra Mountains.

== Biography ==
Under the Nazi occupation of Poland in World War II, on September 25, 1944, the 18 year old Błażusiakówna was one of 16 people arrested and held in the Gestapo headquarters in Zakopane. During her imprisonment she scratched a short prayer into the wall of cell number 3, which was subsequently discovered by the Polish composer Henryk Górecki and set to music as the second movement of his Symphony No. 3 'Sorrowful Songs'.

Eight weeks after her capture, on 22 November 1944, Błażusiakówna was being transported by the Nazis by train, and was one of 12 people rescued by guerrillas. She walked over the mountains to Nowy Targ, where she was given a skirt and a large scarf. That evening she was back with her grandparents in Szczawnica. She fell ill and spent the rest of the war in hospital, where the staff took great risks to treat her and hide her identity.

== Later life ==
Błażusiakówna survived the war, was married in Wadowice in 1950 and gave birth to 5 children.

== The prayer ==
The prayer which Błażusiakówna scratched into her cell wall was signed: Helena Wanda Blazusiakowna, aged 18, detained since 25 September, 1944.

Helena Błażusiakówna's Prayer	Scratched on the wall of cell No. 3 Gestapo Headquarters. Zakopane (1944)
Mother, do not cry, no	Mamo, nie płacz, nie.
Most pure, Queen of Heaven	Niebios Przeczysta Królowo,
Protect me always	Ty zawsze wspieraj mnie
Hail Mary	Zdrowaś Mario

Original text : The LiederNet Archive
