= Flammen (Schulhoff) =

Opera by Erwin Schulhoff

- Opera by Erwin Schulhoff
- Native title: Plameny
- Translation: Flames
- Librettist: Karel Josef Beneš
- Language: German (originally: Czech)
- Based on: Don Juan
- Premiere: 27 January 1932; National Theatre, Brno

Flammen (Flames) is an opera in two acts and ten scenes composed by Erwin Schulhoff, his only opera. The original libretto in Czech was written by Karel Josef Beneš. The opera had its world premiere at the old National Theatre (Národní Divadlo na Veveří) in Brno on 27 January 1932 in Czech under the title Plameny. It was not heard again until the mid-1990s, when it was performed in its German translation by Max Brod as Flammen. Its story is a surrealist retelling of the Don Juan legend with elements from the legend of the Wandering Jew, and heavily influenced by Freudian psychology. Unlike the title character in Mozart's Don Giovanni based on the same legend, Don Juan is not punished by being dragged down to Hell, but instead is condemned to live forever.

== Background and performance history ==
Karel Josef Beneš, the librettist

Not long after Schulhoff's return to Prague in 1923, he met Leoš Janáček's friend and biographer Max Brod, and discussed with him the possibility of writing an opera based on the Don Juan legend. Brod suggested that a new verse play by the Czech writer Karel Josef Beneš (1896–1969) might make a suitable basis for the libretto and introduced him to Beneš. Schulhoff and Beneš began work while Brod translated the text into German.

Veveří National Theatre in Brno, where Flammen premiered in 1932

Schulhoff finished composing the opera in 1929. It premiered three years later at the Veveří National Theatre in Brno on 27 January 1932, performed in its Czech version as Plameny. Schulhoff's detailed stage directions called for sets with an "all-pervading darkness, punctuated by revealing shafts of light and colour". The scenography is echoed by a chorus of Shadows whose commentary makes frequent use of verbal images of colour and light. The premiere was a failure, and the opera never entered the repertory in Czechoslovakia. The rise of the Nazi Party in Germany and its campaign against so-called degenerate music (Entartete Musik) prevented the German premiere which was planned for Berlin with Erich Kleiber conducting. Schulhoff's usual publisher, Universal Edition, did not accept the score for publication, and the opera was not performed again before Schulhoff's death from tuberculosis in the Wülzburg internment camp in 1942.

Interest in the work was revived at Leipzig Opera in 1995 conducted by Udo Zimmermann, performed as Flammen using Brod's German text, with some cuts in the music. Flammen was performed again in concert in May 2005 by Edo de Waart at Amsterdam's Concertgebouw. It had another staged revival, and its Austrian premiere, in 2006 at the KlangBogen Wien Festival. That production, directed by Keith Warner and conducted by Bertrand de Billy, opened on 7 August 2006 at the Theater an der Wien in Vienna. It was one of three operas based on the Don Juan legend presented by the festival that summer—the other two were Mozart's Don Giovanni and Erik Højsgaard's Don Juan Returns from the War. In 2008, Flammen was revived again in Germany with a new production directed by Urs Häberli at the Pfalztheater in Kaiserslautern.

== Roles ==
Although the roles of Donna Anna and Woman were sung by two separate singers in the 1932 premiere, a single singer sang both roles today. Also, in some cases, the roles of Woman/Nun/Donna Anna and Marguerite are both performed by the same singer, as in the 1995 Decca recording and in the 2006 staged production at the Theater an der Wien.

Roles, voice types, premiere cast
Role	Voice type	Premiere cast, 27 January 1932 (Conductor: Zdeněk Chalabala)
Don Juan	heldentenor	Zdeněk Knittl
Woman / Nun / Donna Anna	mezzo-soprano	Božena Žlábková / Marja Zaludová
La Morte (Death)	mezzo-soprano (or contralto)	Marie Hloušková
Marguerite	soprano	
Commendatore	heldenbaritone	Vladimír Jedenáctík
Arlecchino	basso buffo	Géza Fischer
Pulcinella	tenor buffo / silent role	Milan Pokorný
Pantalone	basso buffo / silent role	Karel Křeček
Shadows	3 sopranos, 3 contraltos	
Pierrot, Pierrette, Colombina, and Gigolo (mimes)

== Synopsis ==
The opera is not a straight narrative, but rather a loosely connected set of ten scenes, each with its own name. Don Juan is in love with Death personified by La Morte, the only woman he has not been able to seduce. The Shadows (six women) function as a Greek chorus, commenting on the action and on Don Juan's past life.

=== Act 1 ===
Scene 1 Nocturne

As a haunting solo flute melody plays, Don Juan enters a dark, abandoned house to seduce another woman. La Morte follows his steps, knocking on the door, but only ecstatic moaning and heavy panting are heard from within.

Scene 2 Song of Fire

The Shadows sing of a woman whose desire for Don Juan burns so intensely that he envisions her body aflame, colored with the hues of blood.

Scene 3 Midnight Mass

In an attempt to reform his libertine ways, Don Juan attends Midnight Mass in a church but succumbs to the seduction of a nun. During this temptation, La Morte plays a Gloria on the organ, which transforms into a macabre foxtrot played by a jazz band.

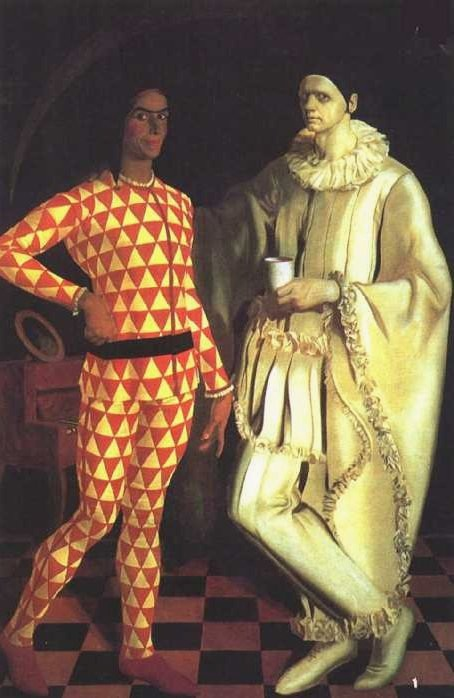
Arlecchino and Pierrot (Alexander Yakovlev, 1914)

Scene 4 Chimera

Don Juan climbs a rocky ridge formed by naked female bodies. At the summit, he finds La Morte waiting. Suddenly, three women appear, exclaiming: "Deception!" In despair, Juan stumbles downward as the Shadows titter.

Scene 5 Gallery

Don Juan meanders through a gallery adorned with statues of his ancestors. Each statue represents a predecessor who, after a life steeped in sin and servitude to numerous deities, ultimately encountered the most formidable one, represented by the so-called 'only true love'—La Morte. Don Juan reflects on the shared destiny that courses through his veins, acknowledging that he, too, will become silent and still in the tranquility of death. Unseen by him, La Morte reaches out with a longing.

Scene 6 Dialogue

A woman, previously appearing as a nun, is frightened by Don Juan's change of heart. She pleads with him not to abandon her, but he is captivated by a vision of another woman in blazing red and rejects her.

Scene 7a Tempest

On a clear day, Don Juan and Marguerite make love. As they kiss, the stage darkens into a raging storm, under which La Morte, consumed by jealousy, appears and takes Marguerite to the other world.

Scene 7 Conversation with the sea

On the sea-coast, Don Juan stands beside the corpse of Marguerite. He confesses to the waves his desire to end his futile attempts at love and his longing for death. The waves respond only with their perpetual "to and fro".

=== Act 2 ===
Scene 8 Carnival Night

During Carnival Night, a commedia dell'arte troupe invites the crowd to witness the return of the title character in Mozart's Don Giovanni. Don Juan, now aged and dressed in period attire as if stepping straight out of legend, dances a foxtrot with Donna Anna, ignoring her warnings about her husband's presence. The troupe returns, and Arlecchino announces the upcoming midnight duel scene of horror. Despite Donna Anna's pleas for him to flee, Don Juan tries to abduct her. Her husband, masked as the Commendatore, intervenes and challenges Don Juan to a duel. Don Juan fatally wounds the Commendatore. He triumphantly sways his sword to a tango as the gigantic statue of the Commendatore illuminates intensely. Juan attempts to take Donna Anna, but she rejects him as "the very image of death" and kills herself with his sword.

Scene 9 Banquet

Don Juan, unable to accept Donna Anna's death, shakes her body, demanding a response. When he calls to her, her corpse eerily raises its upper body. Juan implores her to laugh with him as they will soon face the Commendatore's stone fists, and he can finally unite with his new bride, La Morte. As naked women dance around him in flames, drawing him into a frenzied orgy of pursuit, La Morte appears above them. Juan expresses his desire for her, and though she warns of his impending destruction, he persists with sensual confessions of love. Just as he is about to embrace La Morte, who extends her arms to him as the only man to pass her test, the distant statue of the Commendatore raises its fist and curses him to eternal life. Driven mad, Don Juan shoots himself with a Browning, but instead of dying, he transforms into an even younger man, accompanied by the background sound of a jazz band.

Scene 10 Nocturne

Doomed to desperately repeating the cycle of his life over and over again, Don Juan enters the same darkened house where the opera began, accompanied by the same solo flute, to seduce yet another victim. La Morte knocks on the door as before and falls to his knees, desperately hoping for his salvation. Again, only ecstatic moaning is heard from within. The final words of the opera given to ebbing La Morte: "What would bring us salvation is still so distant, so distant".

== Recordings ==
The world premiere recording of Flammen was recorded in 1994 at the Jesus-Christus-Kirche Dahlem in Berlin by the Deutsches Symphonie-Orchester Berlin and the Berlin RIAS Kammerchor conducted by John Mauceri and released by Decca Records in 1995 as part of its Entartete Musik series. The principal singers were: Kurt Westi (Don Juan), Jane Eaglen (Donna Anna/Nun/Marguerite/Woman), Iris Vermillion (La Morte), Johann-Werner Prein (Commendatore), and Gerd Wolf (Arlecchino).

== Sources ==
- Ambrosius, Claus (2008). "Lohnende Prüfung – Kaiserslautern, Schulhoff: Flammen". Opernwelt, June 2008, p. 44. Accessed 29 January 2011. (in German)
- Bek, Josef (2001). "Schulhoff, Erwin [Ervín]", Grove Music Online. Accessed 29 January 2011. (subscription required). (Online version of The New Grove Dictionary of Music and Musicians, 2nd edition. ISBN 978-0-19-517067-2)
- Black, Leo (1995). "The Return of the Repressed", The Musical Times, Vol. 136, No. 1827, May 1995, pp. 230–232. Accessed 29 January 2011. (subscription required)
- Casaglia, Gherardo (2005). "Flammen, 27 January 1932". L'Almanacco di Gherardo Casaglia (in Italian). Casaglia, Gherardo (2005). "Flammen, 7 August 2006". L'Almanacco di Gherardo Casaglia (in Italian).
- Davis, Peter G. (1997). "Hear No Evil". New York (June 9, 1997) pp. 82–83.
- Eagleton, Michael (2007). "Review: Erwin Schulhoff: Flammen, KlangBogen, Wien 7 August 2006", Journal of the International Centre for Suppressed Music, Jewish Music Institute, SOAS, February 14, 2007. Accessed 29 January 2011.
- Gelli, Piero and Poletti, Filippo eds. (2007). "Flammen", Dizionario dell'opera. Baldini Castoldi Dalai. ISBN 88-6073-184-4 (in Italian)
- Oliver, Michael (1996). "Review: Schulhoff: Flammen (Decca 444630). Gramophone, January 1996, p. 108. Accessed 29 January 2011.
- Seckerson, Edward; Johnson, Stephen (October 27, 1995). "Review: Schulhoff: Flammen (Decca 444630)". The Independent. London, England. Archived from the original on November 5, 2012 – via HighBeam Research.
